= Pachacuti =

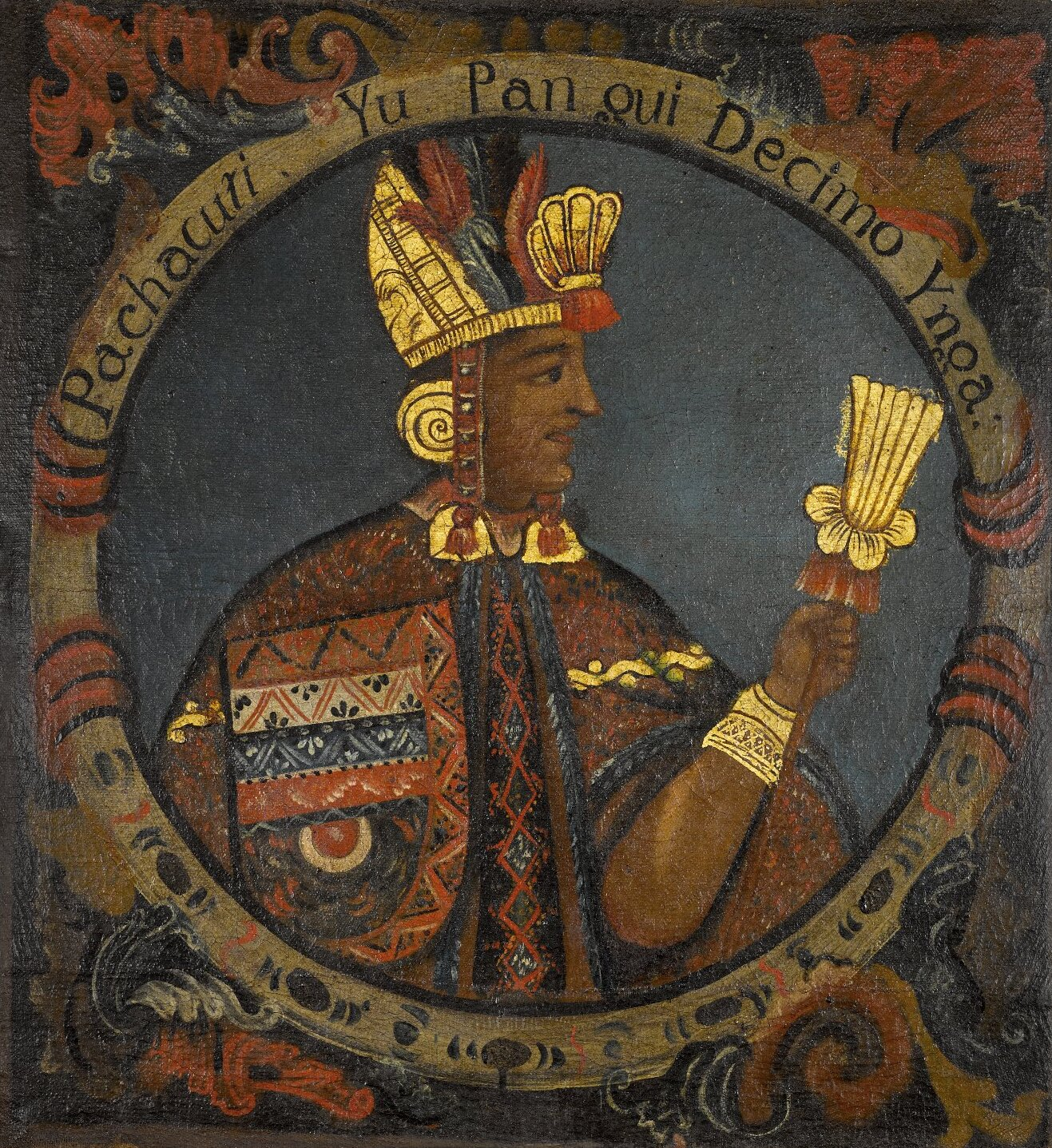
- Pachacuti, mid-18th-century painting, anonymous.

Sapa Inca of the Inca Empire
- Reign: 1438–1471 (Rowe); 1425–1471 (del Busto); 1400–1448 (Means); 1420–1477 (García Ortiz); 1420–1472 (Mendoza del Solar); 1410–1450 (Jaguaribe)
- Predecessor: Viracocha
- Successor: Túpac Inca Yupanqui
- Co-rulers: Amaru Yupanqui (~ 1450); Tupac Yupanqui (1467)
- Born: Cusi Inca Yupanqui or Ripac; 1403 (del Busto); 1418 (Lane); Cusicancha Palace, Cusco, Inca Empire
- Died: 1471 (Rowe); 1448 (Means); Patallacta Palace, Cusco, Inca Empire
- Consort: Mama Anawarkhi or Quya Anawarkhi
- Issue: Tupac Yupanqui, Amaru Topa Inca, Mama Ocllo Coya
Names
- Pachacuti Inca Yupanqui
Regnal name
- Pachacuti
- Quechua: Pachakutiy Inka Yupanki
- Spanish: Pachacútec/Pachacuti Inca Yupanqui
- Lineage (panaka): Iñaca Panaka, later Hatun Ayllu
- Dynasty: Hanan Qusqu, moiety
- Father: Viracocha Inca
- Mother: Mama Runtu
- Religion: Inca mythology: Inti sun cult or Viracocha cult

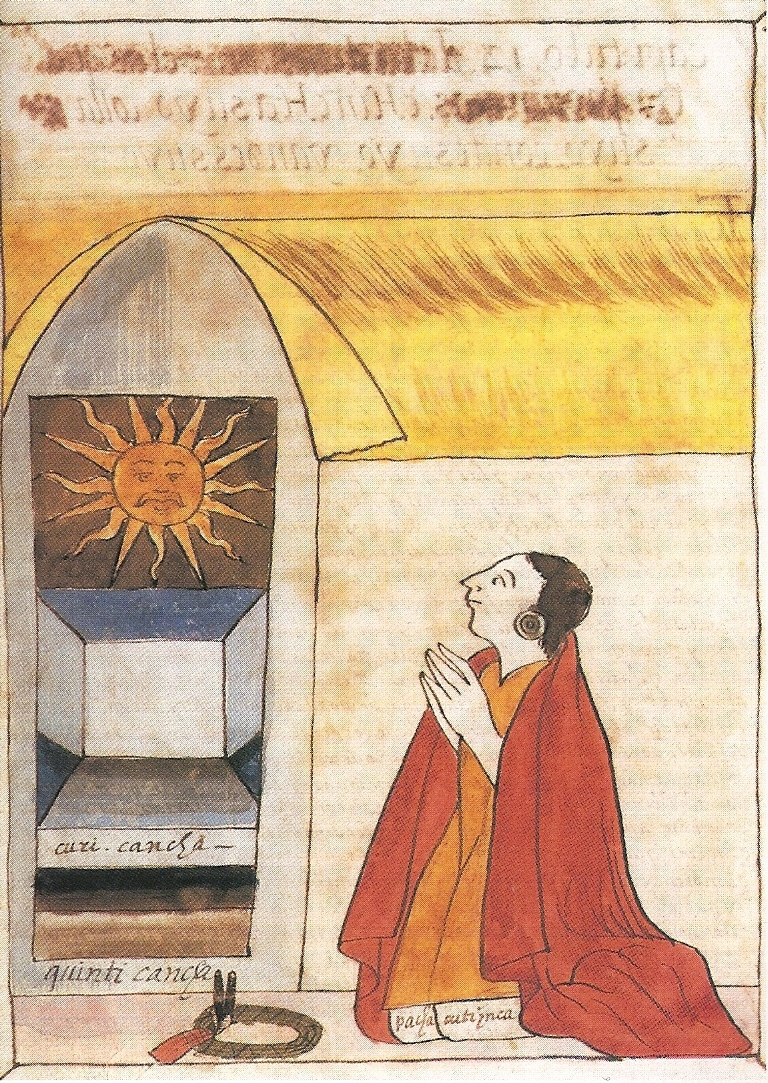
Depiction of Pachacuti worshipping Inti (Sun god) at Coricancha, in the 17th century second chronicles of Martín de Murúa

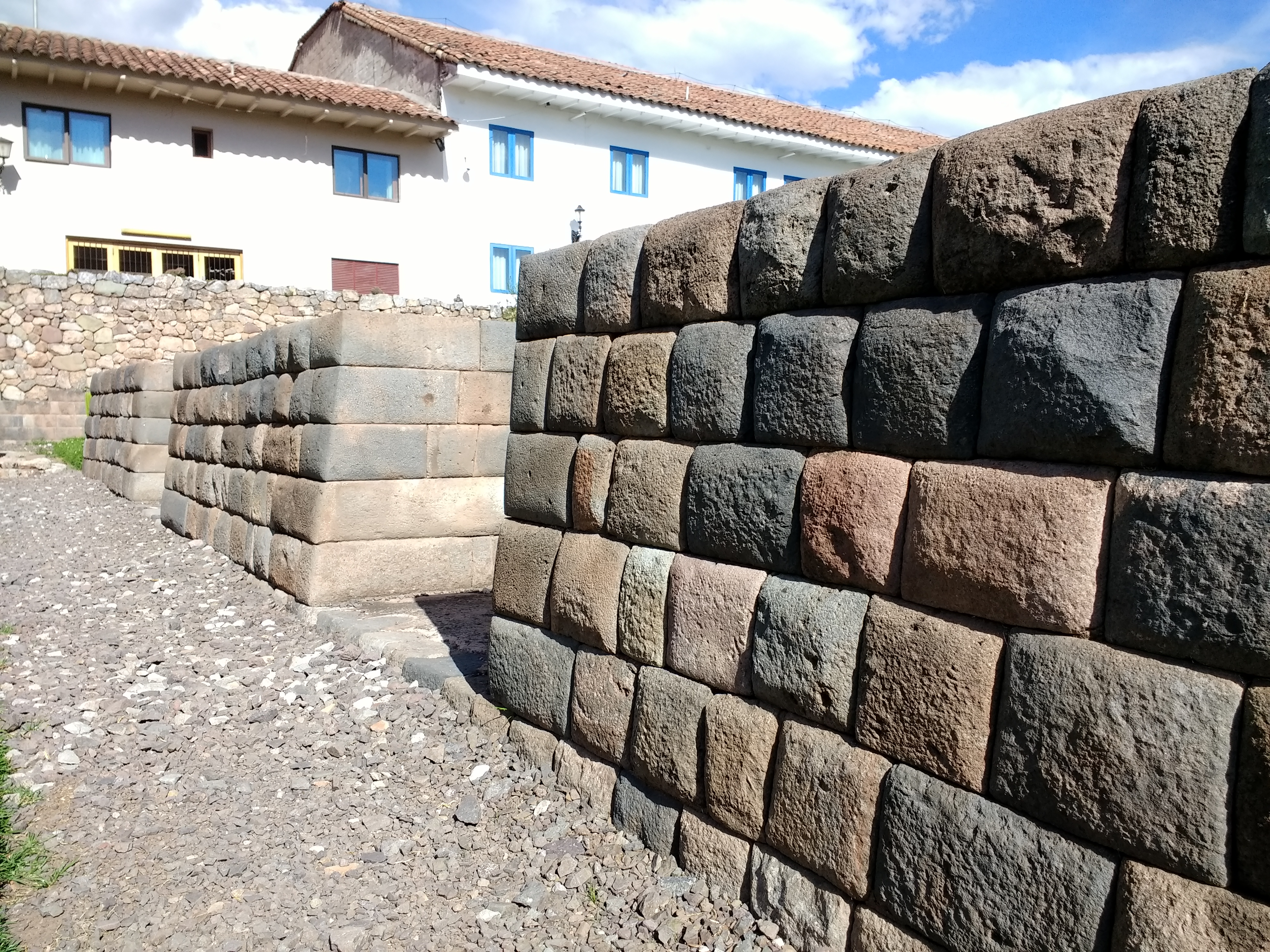
Part of the ruins of Pachacuti's palace in Cuzco

Pachacuti Inca Yupanqui, also called Pachacútec (Quechua: Pachakutiy Inka Yupanki, pronounced [ˈpatʃa ˈkuti ˈiŋka juˈpaŋki]), was the ninth Sapa Inca of the Chiefdom of Cusco, which he transformed into the Inca Empire (Tawantinsuyu). Most archaeologists now believe that the famous Inca site of Machu Picchu was built as an estate for Pachacuti.

In Quechua, the cosmogonical concept of pachakutiy means "the turn of the world" and yupanki could mean "honorable lord". During his reign, Cusco grew from a small town into an empire that could compete with, and eventually overtake, the Chimú empire on the northern coast. He began an era of conquest that, within three generations, expanded the Inca dominion from the valley of Cusco to a sizeable part of western South America. According to the Inca chronicler Garcilaso de la Vega, Pachacuti created the Inti Raymi to celebrate the new year in the Andes of the southern hemisphere. Pachacuti is often linked to the origin and expansion of the cult of Inti.

Following his death, Pachacuti's deeds were transmitted through various means, including genealogical histories, life histories, and quipus, kept near his royal mummy.

Accessing power following the Chanka–Inca War, Pachacuti conquered territories around Lake Titicaca and Lake Poopó in the south, parts of the eastern slopes of the Andes Mountains near the Amazon rainforest in the east, lands up to the Quito basin in the north, and lands from Tumbes to possibly the coastal regions from Nasca and Camaná to Tarapacá. These conquests were achieved with the help of many military commanders, and they initiated Inca imperial expansion in the Andes.

Pachacuti is considered by some anthropologists to be one of the first historical emperors of the Incas, and by others to be a mythological and cosmological representation of the beginning of the era of Inca imperial expansion.

== Name ==
The compound pachacuti refers to an ancient Andean cosmological concept, representing cataclysmic change of era-worlds. The anthroponym appeared written as ⟨Pachacuti⟩ or ⟨Pachacute⟩ in the early colonial chronicles and documents of the 16th century. This written form can be reconstructed into Quechua as pacha kutiy "the turn of the world". The form ⟨Pachacútec⟩ (in contemporary Quechua spelling: ⟨Pachakutiq⟩) was introduced by the writer Inca Garcilaso de la Vega in his Comentarios Reales de los Incas published in 1609. Before the coronation, Pachacuti was referred to as Inga Yupangui, with the Spanish navigator Pedro Sarmiento de Gamboa additionally claiming Pachcuti's first name was Cusi.

The compound is not influenced by other languages such as Aymara or Puquina, and is considered purely Quechua. It is composed of the noun pacha, which today means "world, Earth, universe; (a precise moment in time)" and represents an Andean concept associating time with the physical world, and the verb kuti – "to return, to come back". The apparent absence of a nominalization mark is attributed to the Spanish colonial scribes' failure to recognize the presence of an – y action nominaliser. Consequently, kuti-y means "turn, return". The colonial chronicler Juan de Betanzos translated the anthroponym Pacha Kutiy as "turn of time" and the Peruvian linguist Rodolfo Cerrón Palomino translated the compound as "the turn of the world". The form Pachacútec used in Garcilaso de la Vega's writing likely was caused by the Inca's storing of the agent nominalizer – q instead of the action nominalizer – y. In Quechua, the presence of a uvular consonant such as /q/ causes the vowel /ɪ/ to be pronounced as an [e], thus being transcribed as – ec in Spanish. However, Garcilaso's restitution contradicted early colonial documentation and was grammatically implausible, since the verb kuti – is an intransitive verb, and the chronicler's intended meaning for the word of "(he) who turns the world" required an additional morpheme altering the verbal valence. The form ⟨Pachacutec⟩ (pacha kuti-q) reconstructed by Garcilaso was ungrammatical in Quechua, and the meaning of "he who turns the world" would have instead required an expression similar to pacha kuti-chi-q.

According to the oral tradition of Pachacuti's imperial lineage, the name was acquired following the war against the Chancas, according to the chronicler Juan de Betanzos' version together with the names or epithets Cápac and Indichuri.

== Historicity ==
Pachacuti is often considered the first historical Incan emperor, despite various mythological elements of his reign. Various historians associate Pachacuti with the rewriting of the previous Inca rulers' reigns to justify Incan imperial expansion. The nature of Pachacuti's reign, the cosmological concepts associated with it, the lack of physical representations and of archeological evidence made some scholars come to the conclusion that Pachacuti was an Incan ideological and cosmological concept.

The linguists, anthropologists, archeologists, ethnologists and historians Martti Pärssinen, Catherine Julien, Rodolfo Cerrón Palomino, Alfred Métraux, Brian S. Bauer, John Howland Rowe, Franck Salomon, Waldemar Espinoza Soriano, José Antonio del Busto Duthurburu, and María Rostworowski, and Carmen Bernand consider Pachacuti to be historical, while others, such as Pierre Duviols, Juan Ossio Acuña, Reiner Tom Zuidema, Gary Urton, and Franck Garcia consider Pachacuti to be mythological or mytho-historical. According to the archeologist Franck Garcia, the story of Pachacuti's reign was mainly symbolical and served to set philosophical principles, Inca history having the structural elements of a myth. John Howland Rowe analyzed and compared various colonial sources and came to the conclusion that there existed a state-sanctioned "standard history", believing Pachacuti's victory over the Chanka people to be the cause of imperial expansion. In 1953, María Rostworowski published her biography of Pachacuti and supported Rowe's conclusion of late imperial expansion under Pachacuti. The Dutch structuralist anthropologist Reiner Tom Zuidema criticised Rowe and Rostworowski for methodological practices, and studied the symbolical territorial organization of Cusco and its surroundings. Based on the dualist philosophy of the Andes, Reiner Tom Zuidema and Pierre Duviols came to the conclusion that the Inca Empire was a diarchy, and that Pachacuti had co-reigned with the warrior chieftain Mayta Capac (the fourth ruler of Cusco in the traditional list), while Martti Pärssinen, examining Andean tripartite traditions, wrote that the Inca capital, Cusco, had three rulers, the co-rulers of Pachacuti being Capac Yupanqui and Mayta Capac, while the state-wide imperial administration had only one. In 1945, Rowe devised an imperial chronology, stating Pachacuti reigned from 1438 to 1471, however archeological data suggests the early 15th century to be the beginning of Pachacuti's reign. The former minister of culture Juan Ossio Acuña supported the position of Zuidema, who wrote that the Inca rulers before Topa Inca Yupanqui, including Pachacuti, weren't historical rulers but rather social groups or factions. In 2009, Catherine Julien found that, while Zuidema's structuralist anthropology "does serve to reorient our search for a meaningful Inca history", it " does not take theory of change into account" and describes pre-Hispanic Incas "in the same terms as groups that have survived a long history of colonial domination".

== Chronology ==
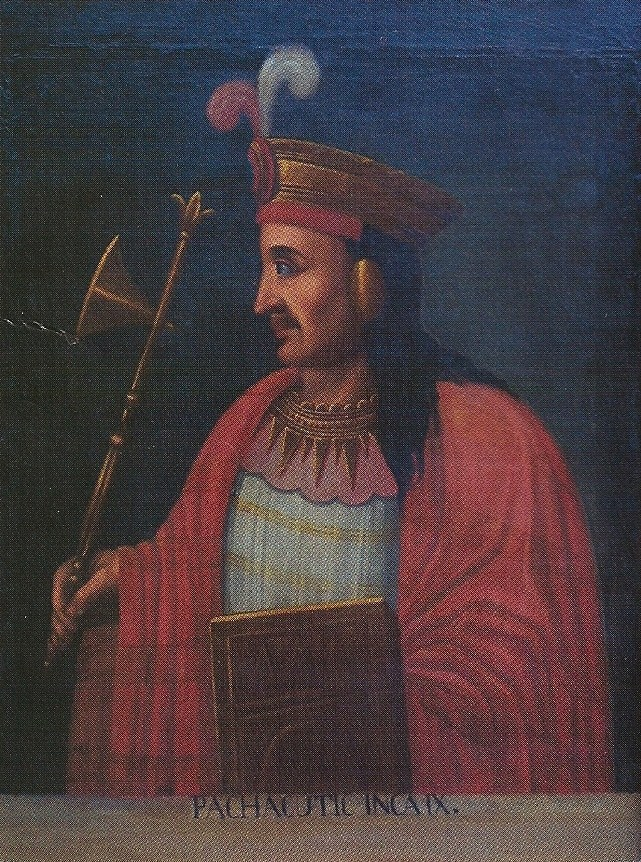
Pachacútec, Sapa Inca IX. Cuzco painting from the 17th century, unknown artist belonging to the movement known as the "School of Cuzco".

The Incas of Cusco did not systematically count years, and dates of Inca mytho-history are only approximations based on comparisons between colonial documents or archeological data. An exact date for the Chanka–Inca War, which marked the beginning of Pachacuti's reign, is not known, since it happened several generations before the arrival of Europeans, maybe in the beginning of the 15th century. However, the dates recorded by colonial chroniclers, though unrealistic, were potentially based on Inca mytho-historical knowledge put on quipu records.

According to the north-American anthropologist Philip Ainsworth Means, Pachacuti reigned from 1400 to 1448. John Howland Rowe, basing himself on the Spanish chronicler Miguel Cabello de Balboa, theorised a standard chronology, in which Pachacuti reigned from 1438 to 1471, however, radiocarbon dates suggest an earlier date, in the beginning of the 15th century. According to Domingos Jaguaribe, Pachacuti's reign lasted from 1410 to 1450. The historian José A. Mendoza del Solar stated in 1920 that Pachacuti's reign took place between 1420 and 1472. The Peruvian historian José Antonio del Busto Duthurburu wrote Pachacuti was born in 1403, defended Cusco from the Chankas in 1424, and reigned from 1425 to 1471. Rowe wrote that Tupac Yupanqui took military command in 1463, while Antonio del Busto Duthurburu thought Tupac Yupanqui, born in 1440, led his first military campaign around 1461. According to del Busto, Amaru Inca Yupanqui's, one of Pachacuti's sons, co-reign happened around 1450. The Peruvian ethno-historian María Rostworowski suggested Pachacuti reigned, from the beginning of the 15th century onward, for around 60 years, 40 years alone, 5 to 6 years with Amaru Yupanqui and 14 to 15 years with Tupac Yupanqui. According to Elías Martinengui Suárez, Amaru Yupanqui's co-reign lasted 10 years. The Bolivian historian Mariano Baptista Gumucio and Santos García Ortiz found Amaru Yupanqui to have reigned independently in 1478, following Pachacuti's death, before quickly being overthrown.

== Sources ==
Inca history was transmitted through oral traditions, quipu cords, and pictographic representations, and had several versions and historiographical genres, mainly the "life history" and "genealogical" genres. The main sources for Pachacuti's reign are the colonial chroniclers Pedro Sarmiento de Gamboa and Juan de Betanzos: the latter based his account on the "life history" genre, transmitted within each Inca rulers' panaka (descent group), and the former, whose work was authenticated by Inca descent groups in Cusco, drew from a compilation of different sources, whose structure was taken from the life history genre. Life histories were compiled at the Sapa Inca's death, and were kept by the ruler's panaka on quipus put near Inca royal mummies. Pachacuti's life history started with the Chanka attack and ended with the emperor's death and the short poem attributed to him.

=== Juan de Betanzos ===
The colonial chronicler Juan de Betanzos based his telling of Pachacuti's reign on the Inca "life history" of Pachacuti, along with other minor Incan sources. Betanzos translated his indigenous wife's telling of Inca history and was familiar with Andean notions of memory. Generally considered reliable, the chronicler had, however, manipulated Pachacuti's epic to insert Yamqui Yupanqui, his wife's ancestor, at the place of Amaru Yupanqui and Tupac Yupanqui. The goal of Betanzos' wife, Angelina Yupanqui, was to access higher legitimacy within Cusco society by claiming her ancestor to have been Pachacuti's initial choice for succession. While most chroniclers found Pachacuti's main wife to have been from the Choco and Cachona ayllus, Betanzos, to conform the royal couple to Inca ideals of legitimacy, wrote she was the emperor's sister.

=== Sarmiento de Gamboa ===
Pedro Sarmiento de Gamboa (c. 1530–1592) was a Spanish explorer and historian who wrote History of the Incas in 1572. Commissioned by the Viceroy of Peru, he collected information from Inca nobles and witnesses to document the history, rulers, religion, and society of the Inca Empire. Although his work remains one of the most important sources on the Incas, historians recognize that it was written partly to justify Spanish colonial rule.

== Early life and parentage ==
Pachacuti's given name was Cusi Yupanqui, or Ripac, and he originated from the female lineage of Iñaca Panaka, in the moiety of Hanan Cusco ("high Cusco"), in complementary opposition to the moiety of Hurin Cusco ("low Cusco"). According to the accounts of the Spanish chroniclers, he was the son of the eighth ruler of Cusco, Inca Viracocha, whose lineage (panaka), however, was Sucsu Panaka. Analyzing the colonial writings, the historian and anthropologist María Rostworowski concluded that, based on Andean traditions of succession, which allowed for the "most able" to take power, Pachacuti was not the son of Inca Viracocha, rendering him illegitimate in the eyes of the Spaniards, who believed in European concepts of primogeniture. According to Catherine Julien, rather than being based on direct descent from the last ruler, Inca legitimacy was, based on a concentration of "capac" status, a status given to direct descendants of Manco Capac and his sister wife, linked to the Sun deity, inherited through the female and male line.

Cusi Yupanqui was born in Cusco, at the palace of Cusicancha, bordering the Inticancha temple. His tutor, Micuymana, taught him history, laws and language, as well as the handling of quipus. From a young age, he was admired by Inca nobles because he had the courage, intelligence and maturity his brother, Inca Urco, the appointed co-ruler and heir to the throne, lacked. Similarly, he showed aptitudes for government and conquest that his brother likewise lacked. The generals of Viracocha started fomenting conspiracies to overthrow and replace Inca Urco.

== Rise to power ==
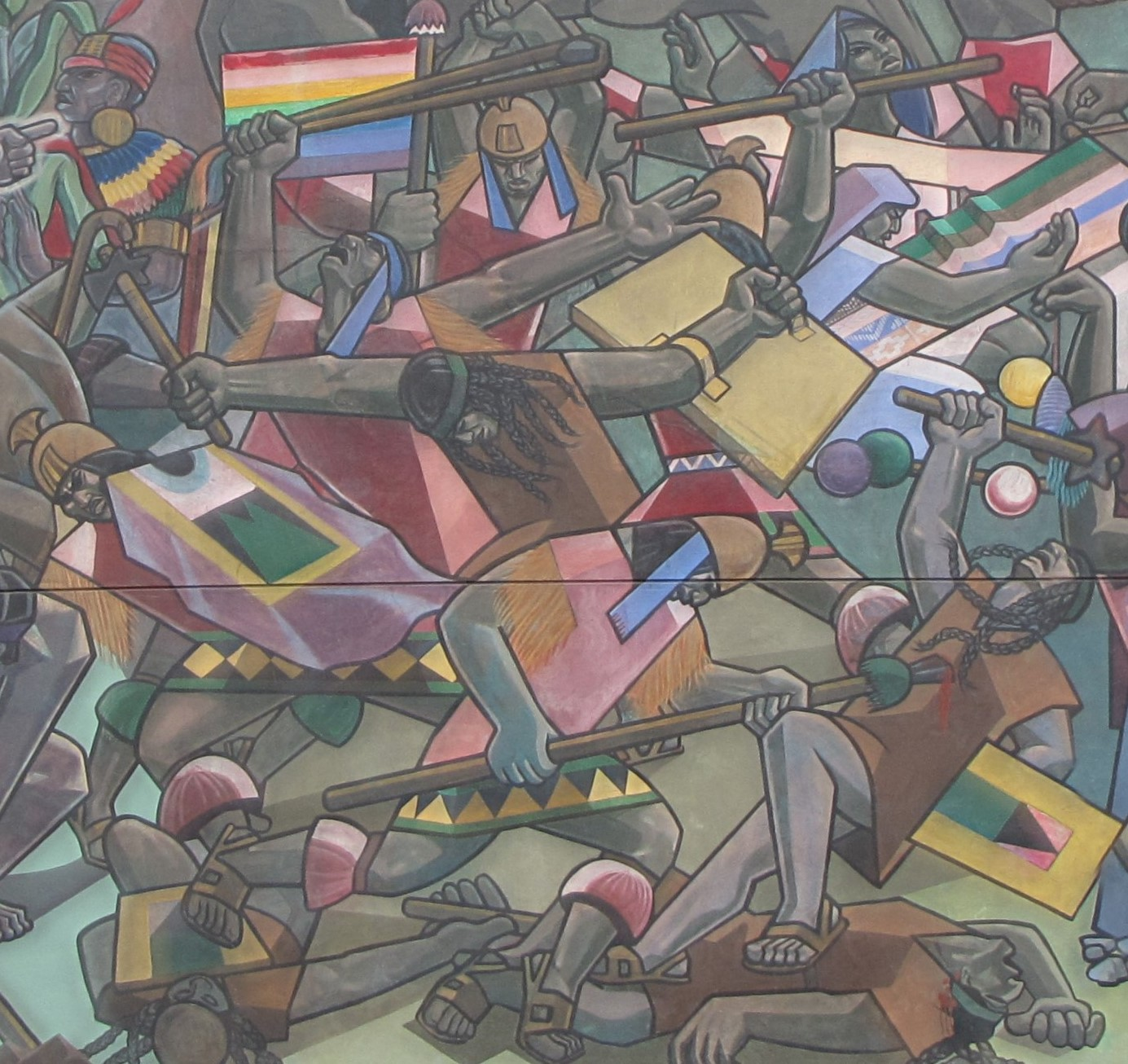
Scene from the Chanka–Inca War on the Great Historical Mural of Cusco

In the early 15th century, the Cusco confederation, stretching 40 kilometers around the city of Cusco, faced an invasion by the Chankas, the Incas' traditional tribal archenemies. Multiple versions of the encounter exist, the most accepted one being supported by the majority of reliable Spanish sources.

The ruler, Inca Viracocha, and his co-ruler Urco, fled the scene, while Cusi Yupanqui rallied the army, accompanied by four of Viracocha's generals, and prepared the defense of the city. During the subsequent assault on Cusco, the Chankas were repelled so severely that legend tells even the stones rose up to fight on Yupanqui's side. At the battle of Yahuar Pampa, the Inka army won a decisive victory over the Chankas and asserted its dominance. Cusi Yupanqui captured many Chanka leaders, who he presented to his father Viracocha for him to wipe his feet on their bodies, a traditional victory ritual. Viracocha told Yupanqui that the honor of the ritual belonged to the designated heir, Urco. Yupanqui protested and said that he had not won the victory for his brothers to step on the Chanka captives. A heated argument ensued, and Viracocha tried to have the general assassinated. Yupanqui was tipped off to the plot, however, and the assassination failed. Viracocha went into exile while Inca Yupanqui returned in triumph to Cusco, and, following a short civil war during which the co-ruler, Urco, died, was crowned Sapa Inca of Cusco, and renamed himself "Pachacuti" (meaning "Earth Shaker").

The ethnic groups surrounding Cusco that helped Pachacuti defeat the Chanka received the status of "hawa inka", "Incas from outside", also translated as "Incas by privilege", and were later often in charge of supervising the construction of bridges or storehouses.

=== Historical accuracy ===
The existence and the historical accuracy of the Chanka attack on Cusco have been questioned regularly, notably because of its similarities with other mythical cyclical events. Archeological evidence is contradictory: the chanka chiefdom was either a powerful polity equal to the Incas, or a loose alliance of independent chiefdoms based on mutual defence. Since the early 1980s, the academic consensus, following the thesis of Pierre Duviols, has been to consider the event as largely mythical. For María Rostworowski, González Carré, Luis Millones and Brian Bauer, the conflict with the chankas was a "legendary saga" and part of the ancient Wari tradition. For Reiner Tom Zuidema and Clementina Battcock, the epic was linked to a conflict between the religious elite and the class of warrior chieftains. For Terence N. D'Altroy, while potentially containing historical elements, the saga of the chanka-inca war "may still be mostly a glorious epic invoked to burnish the image of the emperor's father", Viracocha Inca. Franck Meddens and Cirilo Vivanco Pomacanchari find the Chanka attack to be either the Inca's justification for conquests northwest of Cusco, or the Chanka response to previous Inca aggression by Pachacuti.

== Reign ==
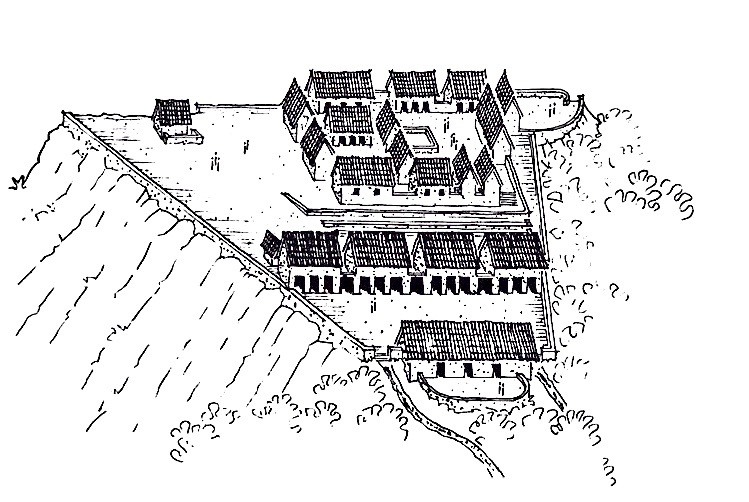
Pachacuti's palace at Vitcos.

As ruler, Pachacuti married Mama Anawarkhi, of the ayllus of Choqo and Cachona, most likely to reward a chief belonging to one of these ayllus who had defended Cusco during the Chanka invasion, and left his original family-clan (panaka) to form the imperial lineage of Hatun Ayllu, failing in his attempt to fuse the two factions. To record the history of the previous Inca rulers of Cusco, Pachacuti ordered the creation of painted wooden panels, which, in relation to oral texts, often in the form of mnemonic songs sung at important celebrations, and quipus, which contained simple and stereotyped information according to colour, order and number, decipherable by Quipucamayocs, represented official and state-sanctioned pre-imperial history. To "incanize" provincial elites culturally and linguistically, Pachacuti gave women from Cusco to the surrounding local chiefs to be their main wives, whose children would rule over their chiefdoms.

Despite Pachacuti's prestige following the victory over the Chankas, he had "little effective power and a meager work force to undertake the development of Cusco". Instituting the system of reciprocity (a socio-economic principle regulating relations, based on obligatory and institutional mutual, "give and take", assistance) to assert his authority, Pachacuti summoned the surrounding kurakas (chiefs) to Cusco, and prepared "lavish feasts and ceremonies", tactically displaying much generosity and sharing gifts, including the booty of the war against the Chankas, before articulating gradually growing demands such as the construction of warehouses, the stocking of produce, the creation of an army, and the improvement of infrastructure. Using the means of reciprocity, Pachacuti rebuilt much of Cusco, designing it to serve the needs of an imperial city and as a representation of the empire. Each suyu had a sector of the city, centering on the road leading to that province; nobles and immigrants lived in the sector corresponding to their origin. Each sector was further divided into areas for the hanan (upper) and hurin (lower) moieties. Many of the most renowned monuments around Cusco, such as the great sun temple Qurikancha (previously Intikancha), were rebuilt during Pachacuti's reign.

At the beginning of Pachacuti's reign, the cult of the Andean creator deity Viracocha, whose priests had supported the previous ruler Viracocha Inca, was possibly replaced by the Inti Sun cult. Some sources however, mentioning a vision of the Viracocha deity Pachacuti could have had on the eve of the chanca attack, believe him to have removed the Inti Sun cult and instituted Viracocha as principal deity. According to Catherine Julien, Pachacuti's vision was originally attributed to the solar supernatural, but was later associated with Viracocha, the latter potentially being an invention post-dating European conquest. The first months of his reign were spent putting down revolts by surrounding chiefs in the Cusco valley and consolidating the territorial base of the polity, confronting the Ayarmacas, the Ollantaytambo, the Huacara, and the Toguaro. Pachacuti conquered lands along the Urubamba valley, where he founded the famous site of Machu Picchu.

=== Expansion of the realm ===
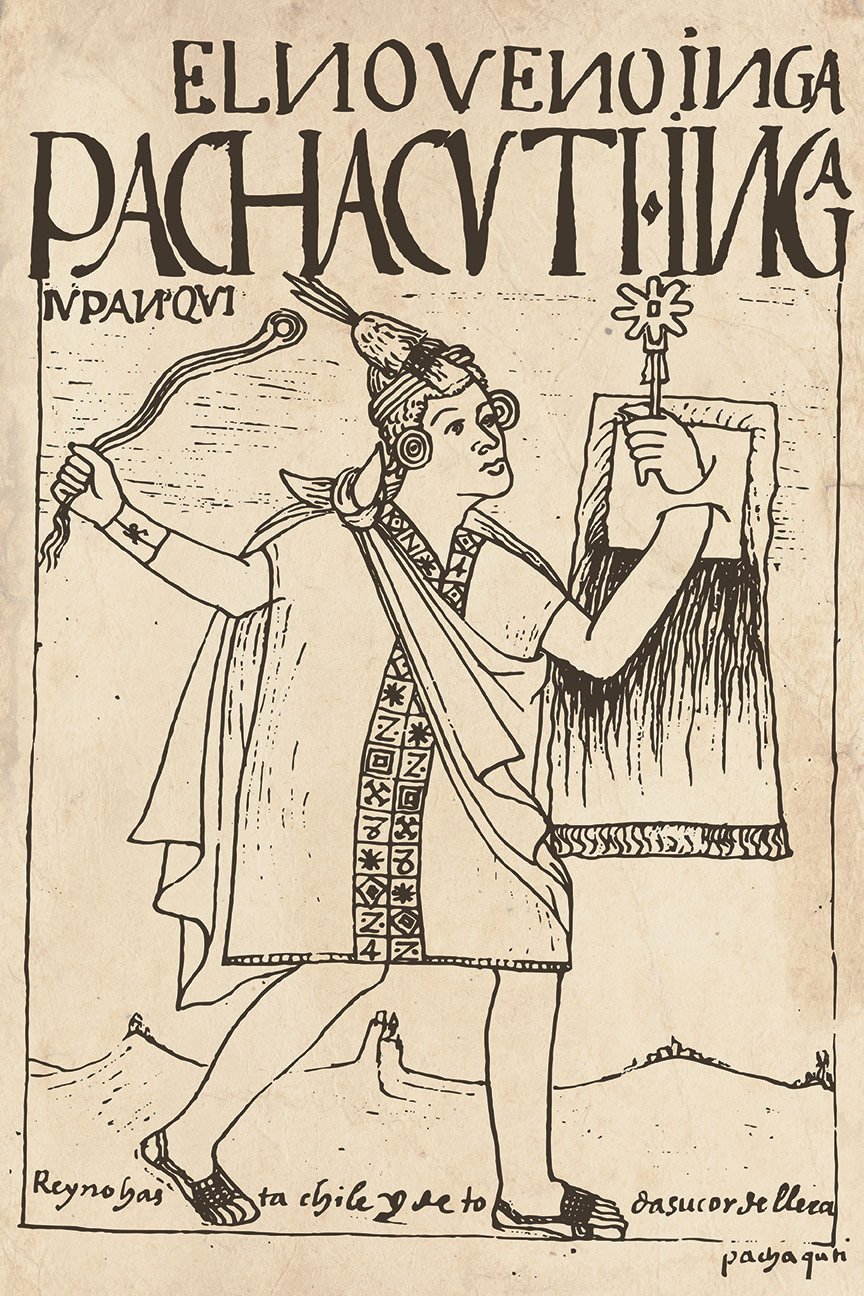
Portrait of Pachacuti, circa 1615

Local kurakas (lords) were integrated using the principle of reciprocity and the "attachment system", where the Inca emperor held personal relations with allied local chiefs and "gifts", in the form of feasts, women, or materials, were exchanged in return for submission, reduced sovereignty, alliance and the construction of hatuncancha (administrative centers). Pachacuti occasionally elevated individuals from the class of yanakunas, servants who weren't obligated or entitled to the obligations and rights of reciprocal exchange, to rulers of local chiefdoms who had rebelled or refused Inca domination.

His first military campaign, led personally by the emperor and his general Apo Mayta, was set against the Chankas' former allies, and the chiefdoms surrounding Cusco. Pachacuti conquered the Soras and Rucanas, the Vilcas, the Lucanas, the Chalcas, and the Cotabambas. The conquest of the chiefdom of Chincha, and the neighboring valley of Pisco, on the south-central coast, also took place during the reign of Pachacuti. The general Capac Yupanqui led an army to Chincha, gaining the recognition and submission of the local chiefs with the help of "reciprocal gifts", in exchange for which the Chincha allowed the construction of administrative centers, the usage of land cultivated by Aclla (women working for the state) and yanakuna servants, and recognized Pachacuti's superiority. However, in 1945, the historian John Howland Rowe attributed the conquest to later rulers, claiming that the initial campaign was a raid.

Pachacuti started the practice of forced migrations, sending mitimaes (colonists) of loyal areas to unstable provinces, or alternatively placing loyal peoples to strategic positions in the Empire. As part of his vision of a statesman and warrior chieftain he conquered many ethnic groups and states, highlighting his conquest of the Collao that enhanced the prestige of the Inca Pachacuti. Due to the remarkable expansion of their domains he was considered an exceptional leader, enlivening glorious epic stories and hymns in tribute to his achievements. Numerous kurakas do not hesitate to recognise his skills and identify him as the "Son of the Sun".

=== Conquest of Qullasuyu ===
The Colla chiefdom and the Lupaca chiefdom of lake Titicaca, in the Altiplano, were one of the first of Pachacuti's targets. Following the construction of the Qurikancha, the "temple of gold" dedicated to the sun, Pachacuti sent an army near the border with the Colla chiefdom, before joining his forces not long after. The Colla chief or Colla Capac, informed of this, gathered his forces and awaited the Inca at the town of Ayaviri. During the ensuing battle, the Incas forced the Colla army to retreat, capturing the king, Colla Capac. Following the victory, Pachacuti occupied the principal city, Hatunqulla, and from there he received the submission of the Lupacas, the Pacasas and the Azangaros (previously a tributary chiefdom of the Collas). John Howland Rowe estimated the Inca Empire under Pachacuti to have reached the Desaguadero River near lake Titicaca, which marked the border between the conquered Lupaca chiefdom and the Pacasa chiefdom. However, in 1992, the Finnish ethno-historian Martti Pärssinen, pointing to local colonial sources, wrote that Pachacuti's generals reached the nation of Charcas, near lake Poopó. Various Spanish chroniclers place the birth of Topa Inca Yupanqui, son of the queen Mama Anarwakhi, during these conquests.

Pachacuti potentially also conquered parts of Kuntisuyu, where many Aymara enclaves of the highland kingdoms existed, including the regions of Arequipa, Camana and Tarapacá. The conquest of Kuntisuyu is also attributed to Amaru Topa Inca, during the subsequent revolt of the chiefdoms around lake Titicaca.

==== Revolt ====
During military expeditions in the eastern lowlands and the Amazonian rainforest, the Colla, Lupaca and Azangaro revolted, led by one of the sons of the previous Colla ruler. According to Sarmiento de Gamboa, an army of around 200.000 men was assembled, commanded by Amaru Topa Inca, Tupac Ayar Manco and Apu Paucar Usnu, to put it down. After having put down the revolt, the Inca army continued beyond Inca territory and conquered the nations of Sora, Caranga, Caracaras Quillaqua, Charca, Chui and Chicha, near and around lake Poopó, possibly united in an inter-provincial wider confederation of large polities or Hatun apocazgo.

=== Expeditions to Chinchaysuyu ===
Inca expansion according to John Howland Rowe.

Pachacuti personally conquered the nations surrounding the kingdom of Cusco, and left the military command of subsequent campaigns to his generals, retiring to concentrate on administrative reforms and the embellishment of Cusco.

The military commander Capac Yupanqui was sent, together with the captains Huayna Yupanqui and Yamqui Yupanqui, to the northern regions of Chinchaysuyu, accompanied by the Chanka army led by the military chief or sinchi Anco Huallu. The Inca armies occupied the fortress of Urcocollac, advanced through territories of the central Andes, including those of the Huanca, the Yauyos and the Atavillos. At Huaylas, Capac Yupanqui established the military center of Maraycalle, from where the Inca forces conquered the confederated chiefdoms of Huaylas, Piscopampas, Pincos, Huaris and Conchucos. The Inca armies eventually arrived at the Cajamarca chiefdom, whose capital and main sub-chiefdom was Guzmango, in the Hanansaya moiety. Capac Yupanqui, by invading the Cajamarca chiefdom, began tensions with the coastal ally of Cajamarca, the Chimú Empire, which spread from Tumbes in the north to Carabayllo in the south. According to John H. Rowe, the territories annexed by the Empire reached until Chinchaycocha, near the centre of Bombón, the rest of the campaign merely raiding the territories up to the Cajamarca chiefdom. The French historian Henri Favre stated that an Inca garrison was established in Cajamarca, leaving a gap between the rest of Inca territory and Cajamarca.

Pachacuti gave military command to his son and heir Topa Inca Yupanqui, who led military campaigns in the northern parts of the Inca Empire and consolidated Capac Yupanqui conquests. Establishing Cajamarca as a military base, he led an expedition against the Chimú Empire, from the mountains neighbouring the costal lowlands (yungas), forcing the Chimú ruler, Minchançaman, to surrender by cutting the irrigation canals of the Moche River leading to the Chimú capital of Chan Chan. Other campaigns were led against the Chachapoya, the Quitu, the Cañari, and regional chiefdoms of modern-day Ecuador. Martti Pärssinen wrote that the territories north of Tomebamba and Cañar were potentially conquered after Pachacuti's reign, who abdicated in favor of his successor according to the chronicler Martín de Murúa.

Following these campaigns, Topa Inca's conquests were celebrated on his return to Cusco.

=== Amaru Yupanqui ===
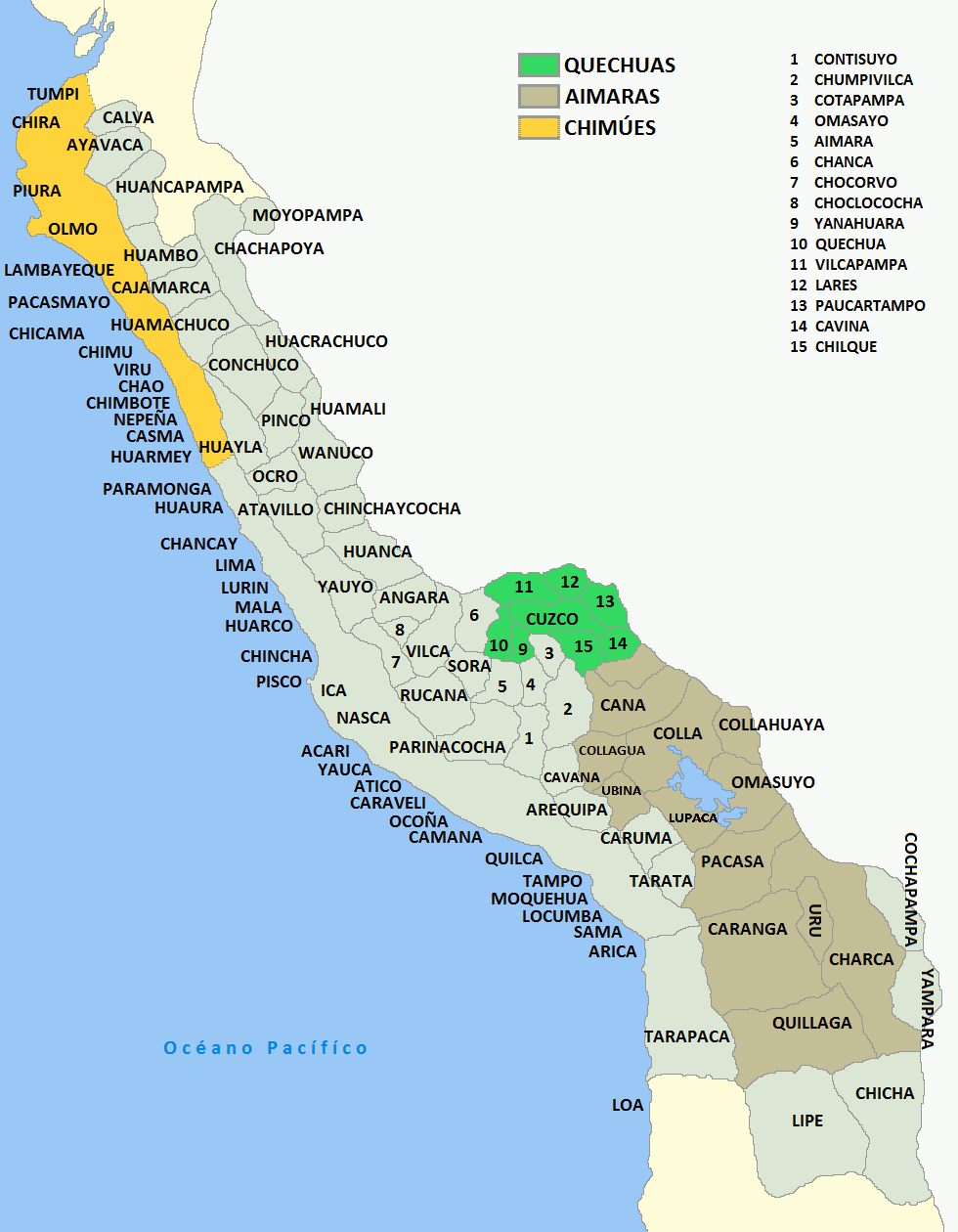
Central and south Andean chiefdoms.

In accordance with Inca successoral customs, Pachacuti named his crown prince, Amaru Yupanqui, his co-ruler, to prove the latter's military, administrative and intellectual capacities, as well as to avoid wars of succession following his death. Under Amaru's co-reign, the Collas revolted while Pachacuti led an expedition in the Amazon rainforest, which was put down and potentially led the Inca armies to conquer lands in Kuntisuyu. According to the traditions collected by colonial chroniclers, Amaru was a "gentle individual" concentrated on "agriculture and the construction of hydraulic canals". Lacking the military capacities necessary to become Sapa Inca, after 5 to 6 or 10 years of co-reign, Pachacuti revisited his decision and instead presented his son Tupac Yupanqui before the Inca nobles who proceeded to elect Tupac co-ruler. Other sources indicated Amaru's reign ended immediately after his mother's death, because of the disdain the Inca nobility of Cusco had for him. Amaru continued to have an important place in the government following his co-rule; he profited from a private estate and was in charge of the huacas (sacred sanctuaries) of the Qullasuyu region. He was described as a philosopher, and as "too human to be ruler". Some historians, however, find Amaru Yupanqui's reign to have occurred following the end of Pachacuti's. In this interpretation, Amaru was quickly overthrown by Tupac Yupanqui.

=== Reforms ===
In Andean cosmology and mythology, Pachacuti is an important figure along with the creator deity Viracocha and the mythical first Inca Manco Cápac. Pachacuti's role was that of an archetype of the perfect Inca ruler according to the philosophical principles of the Inca ruling caste, and of spreading the Inca cultural model and pantheon to the various ethnic groups of the Andes.

Pachacuti built irrigation networks, cultivated terraces, roads and hospices. The "Road of the Inca" (Qhapaq Ñan) stretched from Quito to Chile. Pachacuti is also credited with having displaced hundreds of thousands in massive programs of relocation and resettling them to colonize the most remote edges of his empire. These forced colonists, called mitimaes, represented the lowest place in the Incan social hierarchy.

The reconstruction of Coricancha is done in honor of Viracocha, an "illogicality" justified by theological and political reasoning representing the divinity and the former sovereign Viracocha as "Sun-Lord, the mature adult, who ages and declines", while the protective divinity of Pachacutec is the "Sun-Son", a sign of hope, growth and future.

== Death and succession ==
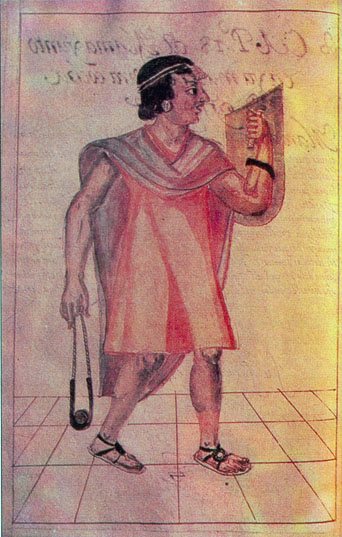
Representation of Pachacuti in the manuscript of the colonial chronicler Martin de Murúa, assisted in his research by the indigenous chronicler Felipe Guamán Poma de Ayala.

Despite his political and military talents, Pachacuti did not improve the system of succession. His son became the next Inca without any recorded dispute after Pachacuti died in 1471 due to a terminal illness, even though some colonial sources hint at Pachacuti's abdication prior to his death. But in future generations, the next Inca had to gain control of the empire by winning enough support from the apos, priesthood, and military to win a civil war or intimidate anyone else from trying to wrest control of the empire. Pachacuti was a poet and the author of the Sacred Hymns of the Situa city purification ceremony. Pedro Sarmiento de Gamboa attributed one song to Pachacuti on his deathbed: "I was born as a lily in the garden, and like the lily I grew, as my age advanced / I became old and had to die, and so I withered and died."

Pachacuti initially nominated his son Amaru Topa Inca to be co-ruler and heir to the throne. However, due to the lack of military talent found in the joint prince, Pachacuti changed his decision and instead decided to name another of his sons, Tupac Inca Yupanqui, who in turn had a reputation as a talented general, as his co-ruler and successor. In his last years, the Inca government might have been de facto in the hands of his "helper" (Quechua: yanapac), "companion" (yananti), or "brother" (huauque) in the semi-diarchy of the Inca, by the name of Yamqui Yupanqui. At the death of Pachacuti, instead of confirming his own power, Yamqui Yupanqui rather confirmed Tupac Inca Yupanqui as successor to his father. Some historians, however, doubt the internal organization of Cusco, separated into Hanan Cusco and Hurin Cusco moities, each of which potentially had two rulers, was identical to the state-wide organization of the Empire into Hanan saya ("high half") and Hurin saya ("low half"), of which they doubt it had more than one king.

Pachacuti's mummy was transported on his own wishes to the palace of Patallacta, but was later found at Tococache.

== Lineage ==
Pachacuti, considered the son of Inca Viracocha and Mama Runtu, was, according to most traditional lists of Inca rulers, the fourth ruler of a lineage from the Hanan moiety of Cusco, whose rulers are collectively called the Hanan dynasty. He had several sons, among which are Tupac Ayar Manco, Apu Paucar, Amaru Topa or Amaru Yupanqui, Yamqui Yupanqui, Auqui Yupanqui, Tilca Yupanqui, and Tupac Inca Yupanqui.

Pachacuti had two of his brothers, Capac Yupanqui and Huayna Yupanqui, killed after the military campaign against the region of Chinchay-Suyu. He also killed his sons Tilca Yupanqui and Auqui Yupanqui. Some ethno-historians however think that Capac Yupanqui was the co-ruler or Huauque (lit. 'brother') of Pachacuti.

Amaru Topa was originally chosen to be the co-regent and eventual successor. Pachacuti later chose Tupac Inca because Amaru was not competent in military affairs. He was the first Inca ruler to abdicate.

His lineage or panaqa of birth was Iñaka Panka, whose common ancestor was Mama Wako, the wife of Manco Capac, which he left to found his own lineage called Hatun Ayllu. He married Mama Anawarkhi or Anarwakhi (Coya Anahuarque), of the ayllus of Choqo and Cachona, most likely to reward a chief belonging to one of these ayllus who had defended Cusco during the Chanka invasion.

== Legacy ==
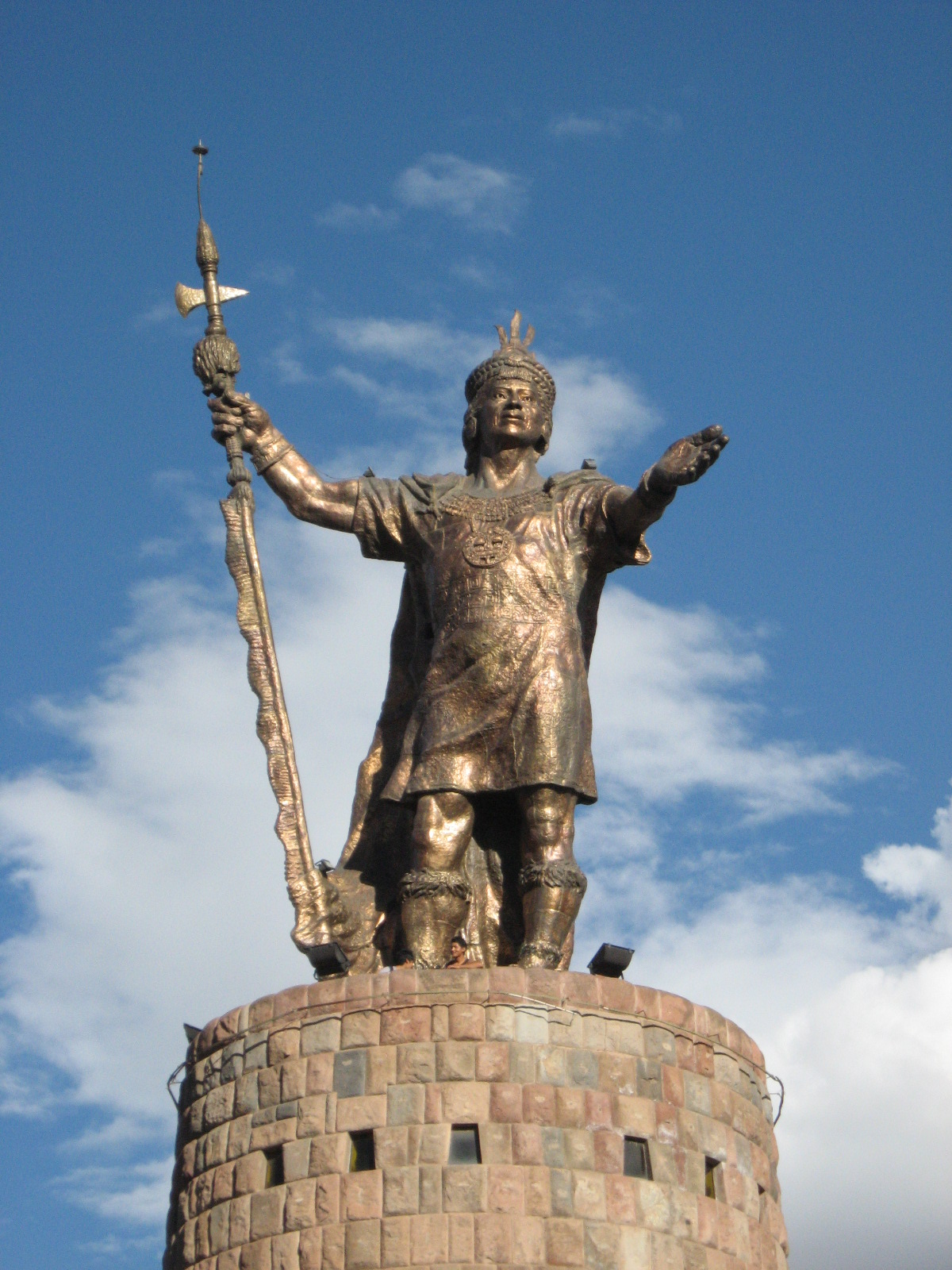
Pachacuti Monument on the Sun Avenue in Cusco

=== In popular culture ===
- Pachacuti is featured as the leader of the Inca in the video games Europa Universalis IV, Civilization III, Civilization V, Civilization VI, and Civilization VII.
- Pachacuti, a resurrected Sapa Inca king who is over 500 years old, plays a major role in James Rollins' novel Excavation, whose major action occurs in the Peruvian Andes. The book is steeped in history and culture about the Inca, Moche, and Quechan peoples, their interactions with the Dominican Order and Spanish conquistadors, and the Spanish Inquisition.
- He was portrayed in the American documentary series Mankind: The Story of All of Us.
- The BBC children's series Horrible Histories featured Pachacuti, played by Mathew Baynton, in the song "Do the Pachacuti" (a parody of novelty party songs) during its second series.
- Pachakutiq is the name of a character played by Clark Gregg in season six of the Marvel TV series Agents of S.H.I.E.L.D. — not the Incan emperor, but a character who might be said to be a "he who overturns space and time" in a certain sense.
- The video game Age of Empires II: Definitive Edition contains a five-chapter campaign titled "Pachacuti".

== See also ==
- Colla–Inca War
- Diarchy

== Bibliography ==
- Baptista, Mariano (1981). Historia de Bolivia – para lectores de 9 a 90 años (in Spanish). Empressa Editora.
- Battcock, Clementina (2018). La Guerra entre Incas y Chancas [The War between Incas and Chancas] (PDF) (in Spanish). National Autonomous University of Mexico.
- Battcock, Clementina (2013). "El episodio de la guerra entre incas y chancas – una propuesta sobre su construcción e interpretación" [The episode of the war between incas and chancas: a proposal about its construction and interpretation]. Tzintzun (in Spanish) (57): 15–43.
- Bauer, Brian S. (1996). El desarrollo del estado inca. Centro de Estudios Regionales Andinos "Bartolomé de Las Casas". pp. 60–64. ISBN 9788483870464.
- Betanzos, Juan (2015) [1551]. Suma y Narración de los Incas (in Spanish). PUCP. p. 195.
- Burger, Richard; Lucy C. Salazar (2004). Machu Picchu - Unveiling the Mystery of the Incas. Yale University Press. ISBN 978-0-300-09763-4.
- Cameron, Ian (1990). Kingdom of the Sun God: a history of the Andes and their people. Facts on File. p. 58. ISBN 978-0-8160-2581-7. LCCN 90037627. OCLC 21591920.
- Cerrón-Palomino, Rodolfo (2008). Voces del Ande – ensayos sobre onomástica andina. Pontificia Universidad Católica del Perú. doi:10.18800/9789972428562. ISBN 978-9972-42-856-2.
- Cerrón-Palomino, Rodolfo (2013a), Las lenguas de los incas - el puquina, el aimara y el quechua, Peter Lang, doi:10.3726/978-3-653-02485-2/1
- Cerrón-Palomino, Rodolfo (2013b). Tras las huellas del Inca Garcilaso - el lenguaje como hermenéutica en la comprensión del pasado [After the footsteps of Inca Garcilaso - language as hermeneutics in the understanding of the past] (in Spanish). Latinoamericana Editores, CELACP, Revista de Crítica Literaria Latinoamericana. pp. 109–110. ISBN 978-0-9747750-4-3.
- Covey, Alan (2018). "The Spread of Inca Power in the Cuzco Region". In Alconini, Sonia; Covey, Alan (eds.). The Oxford Handbook of the Incas. Vol. 1. Oxford University Press. doi:10.1093/oxfordhb/9780190219352.013.13.
- D'Altroy, Terence N. (2003). The Incas. Blackwell. ISBN 9781405116763.
- De Gamboa, Pedro Sarmiento (December 2011). History Of The Incas. CreateSpace Independent Publishing Platform. ISBN 9781463688653.
- del Busto, José Antonio (2000). Una cronología aproximada del Tahuantinsuyo [An approximate chronology of the Tawantinsuyu] (PDF) (in Spanish). Pontifical Catholic University of Peru. pp. 16–24. ISBN 9789972423505. Archived from the original (PDF) on 7 April 2003.
- Espinoza, Waldemar (1997). Los Incas (in Spanish) (3 ed.). Amaru Editores.
- Favre, Henri (2020). Les incas (in French) (10th ed.). Presses Universitaires de France. pp. 19–25.
- García, Santos (1948). Historia del Perú – Descubrimiento, conquista y virreynato (in Spanish). Lumen.
- Garcia, Franck (2019). Les incas (in French). Éditions Ellipses. ISBN 978-2-340-03941-4.
- Garcia, Franck (March 2023). "Carmen Bernand, La religion des Incas, Paris, Éditions du Cerf, 2021, 320 p.". Annales: Histoire, Sciences Sociales. 78 (1): 177–180. doi:10.1017/ahss.2023.58.
- H. Rowe, John (1945). "Absolute Chronology in the Andean Area". American Antiquity. 10 (3): 265–284. doi:10.2307/275130. JSTOR 275130.
- Itier, César (2008). "L'organisation sociale et politique" [The social and political organisation]. Les incas [The Incas] (in French). Les Belles Lettres.
- Izumi, Shimadi, ed. (2015). The Inka Empire – A multidisciplinary approach. University of Texas Press. ISBN 978-0-292-76079-0.
- Julien, Catherine (2000). Reading Inca History. University of Iowa Press. ISBN 978-0-87745-797-8.
- Lane, Kevin (2022). The Inca: Lost Civilizations. United Kingdom: Reaktion Books.
- Laura, Laurencich Minelli, ed. (2000). The Inca World – The Development of Pre-Columbian Peru, 1000–1534 A.D. University of Oklahoma Press. ISBN 9780806132211.
- Jaguaribe, Domingos (1927). O imperio dos incas - no Perú e no Mexico. O Pensamento.
- Mannion, Sean (2014). Las sucesiones en el imperio de los incas (in Spanish). Hispanic American Historical Review.
- Mann, Charles C. (2006), 1491 – New revelations of the Americas before Columbus, Vintage, p. 76, ISBN 9781400032051
- Martinengui Suárez, Elías (1980). El imperio de los Incas - Causas de su destrucción [The Empire of the Incas - Causes of its destruction] (in Spanish). Big Print.
- Márquez Zorrilla, Santiago (1965). Huari y Conchuco (in Spanish). Imprenta el Cóndor. pp. 27–28.
- Mendoza, José A. (1920). La evolución social y política en el antiguo Perú. Tipografía Cáceres.
- Métraux, Alfred (1961). Les incas (in French). Éditions du Seuil.
- Molinié, Antoinette (1994). "Manceau, R. — Atawallapa ou la dérision du destin". Journal de la société des américanistes. 80 (1): 351–353.
- Ogburn, Dennis (2012). "Reconceiving the Chronology of Inca Imperial Expansion". Radiocarbon. 54 (2): 219–237. Bibcode:2012Radcb..54..219O. doi:10.2458/azu_js_rc.v54i2.16014.
- Pärssinen, Martti (1992). Tawantinsuyu - The Inca State and Its Political Organization. SHS. ISBN 978-951-8915-62-4.
- Pomacanchari, Cirilo Vivanco; Meddens, Franck (2005). "The Chanca confederation; political myth and archeological reality" (PDF). Xama. 15 (18).
- Ravines, Rogger (1970). 100 años de arqueología en el Perú (in Spanish). p. 334.
- Rostworowski, María (1999a). History of the Inca Realm. Translated by B. Iceland, Harry. Cambridge University Press.
- Rostworowski, María (2001). Pachacútec Inca Yupanqui (in Spanish). Instituto de Estudios Peruanos. ISBN 9972-51-060-3.
- Rowe, John (1990). "Machu Picchu a la luz de documentos de siglo XVI". Historia. 16 (1).
- Steele, Paul Richard; Allen, Catherine J. (2004). Handbook of Inca Mythology. ABC-Clio. ISBN 978-1-57607-354-4.
- Temoche Cortez, Patricia (2010). Breve historia de los incas [Short history of the Incas] (in Spanish). Ediciones Nowtilus. p. 138. ISBN 9788497634434.
- Urton, Gary (1999). Inca Myths. British Museum Press. pp. 57–58. ISBN 978-0-7141-1791-1.
- Zuidema, Tom (1964). The Ceque System of Cusco - The Social Organisation of the Capital of the Inca. Brill Publishers. pp. 15–16.

Regnal titles
Preceded by Viracocha	Sapa Inca; 1438 – 1471/1472	Succeeded by Túpac Inca Yupanqui
