= Chanka–Inca War =

15th-century conflict in western South America

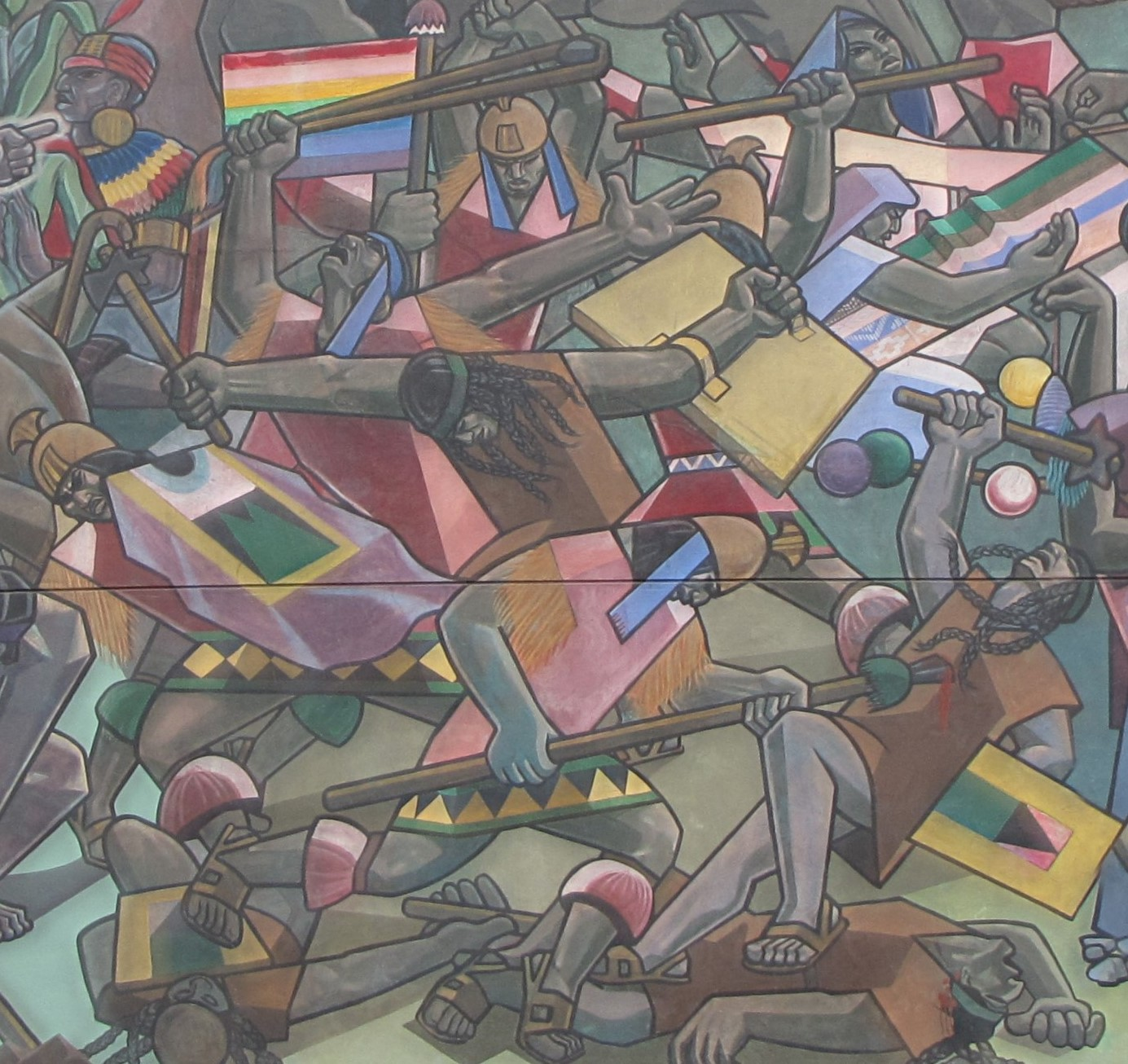
- Painting representing Inca warriors fighting the Chankas.
Date	Beginning of the 15th century, 1438 (Rowe), 1424–1425 (del Busto), exact date unknown
Location	Cusco, Andahuaylas and Apurímac
Result	Inca victory; Start of the Third Inca Expansion.; Establishment of the Inca Empire.
Territorial changes	Conquest and annexation of the Chanka confederation to the new Inca Empire.

Belligerents
Cusco Chiefdom	Chanka Chiefdom

Commanders and leaders
Pachacútec	Astoy Huaraca (executed); Tomay Huaraca (executed)

Strength
est. 30,000 troops	est. 300,000 troops

Casualties and losses
est. 4,000 killed	~300,000 killed 100,000 enslaved

The Inca-Chanka war was a semi-legendary, mytho-historical, potentially mythical, military conflict fought between Cusco and the Chanka chiefdom, several generations prior to the arrival of Europeans. It is the final conflict between these two people.

The exact date of the conflict is unknown; it potentially took place at the beginning of the 15th century.

The Chanka confederation was a loose defensive alliance of various independent chiefdoms, while the Cusco confederation, which later became the Inca Empire, was a unified, hierarchically structured polity with a ruling elite and a cultural identity.

After a victory during the Chanka attack of Cusco, the Inca armies marched into Chanka territory and defeated them at the Battle of Yahuarpampa.

The war was an important event to the geo-politics of the region, and opened the way for the creation of the Inca Empire. Because of his victory, Cusi Yupanqui, whose later name was Pachacuti, gained universal recognition, overthrowing his father, the ruler of Cusco, and his brother Urco, the co-ruler and designated heir. Through his new found prestige he rapidly initiated the Inca expansion.

The effects of the war were exaggerated by the Inca ruling class, which made Cusi Yupanqui the archetype of its philosophical principals. The historical accuracy of the story told by colonial documents of the episode of the Chanka attack against Cusco is regularly questioned.

== Historicity ==
The historicity of the traditional story told by the Incas of Cusco is regularly called into question, because of similarities with other cyclical stories of Inca mytho-history and a lack of alphabetically written sources. Transmitted through quipus (knotted cords), linked to oral texts and pictographic images, Inca historiography was separated into various genres, and each lineage had its own version of Inca history. Archeological evidence sometimes contradicts, and sometimes complements the traditional story.

According to the archaeologist and anthropologist Gary Urton, two historiographical traditions exist; one considers Spanish colonial sources reliable and supports that the Chanka attack on Cusco represented the moment Inca myth became history, while the other thinks that the Chanka–Inca War was semi-legendary, but contained historical details, including the occupation of former Wari lands. Since the early 1980s, following the publication of a paper by the French anthropologist Pierre Duviols, the academic consensus has seen the war as a largely mythical event. The Peruvian ethno-historian María Rostworowski thought the Chanka–Inca War to be the Incas' explanation for their rapid ascension. According to her and González Carré, the Chankas were warrior hordes who defeated the Wari State in the 11th century, and Yupanqui's imperial title, Pachacuti, was an ancient title formerly used by Wari rulers. Reiner Tom Zuidema and Clementina Battcock consider the event to have been linked to conflicts between the religious ruling class and the warrior chieftains ("sinchis") who, according to Battcock, would have taken power following the news of a Chanka attack. Franck Garcia indicates that archeological research in the Andahuaylas region supports the existence of a powerful polity, while for Frank Meddens and Cirilo Vivanco Pomacanchari, the Chanka confederation was a loose defensive alliance of various independent local chiefdoms, while the Inca chiefdom of Cusco had a ruling elite, a unified cultural identity, and was in the process of developing a state structure. According to them, the expansionist Inka state either invaded a Chanka chiefdom "ripe for conquest" and used the narrative of a Chanka attack to justify the conquest of territories northwest of Cusco, or started hostilities with the Chanka prior to the attack. For Luis Millones and Brian Bauer, the war was a "legendary saga" conceived to explain Inca ascension to power, which would have been of part of ancient Wari tradition. For Terence N. D'Altroy, while the Chankas might have been an important adversary of the Incas in the early years of expansion, the "sagas of the Chanka wars may still be mostly a glorious epic invoked to burnish the image of the emperor's father", Viracocha Inca. According to him, scepticism also arises from the confusion in the Inca ruler list, as Urco, usually represented as Viracocha Inca's favourite son and heir to the throne, was described by the colonial chronicler Pedro Cieza de León as an independent ruler of Cusco, during the Viracocha Inca's life. This assertion was later refuted by the indigenous chronicler Yamqui Pachacuti. For María Rostworowski, Urco was co-ruler of Viracocha Inca while the latter still lived, and was supposed to succeed him. To take power from Urco, a short civil war occurred between Pachacuti and Urco following the Inca victory over the Chankas. According to Cieza de Leon, the Incas removed Urco from the list of Inca rulers. This inconsistency has been linked to a general debate between academics on Inca succession customs, some finding the Incas to have had concepts of absolute monarchy and primogeniture, others judging the latter two to be euro-centric concepts, believing the Incas to have evaluated the capacities of the successor by naming him co-regent of the Inca ruler, and others think a "generational succession" was also observable in the Andes.

For the Inca lineages (panakas), who, according to their ascent, attributed the war to either Viracocha Inca or Pachacuti, the Pachacuti-Viracocha era was an explanatory unit used to describe the ascension of the Inca State, and Pachacuti became a national hero and an archetype of good government.

== Chronology ==
The exact date of the conflict is unknown, since it took place several generations prior to the Spanish arrival.

For the Peruvian historian José Antonio del Busto Duthurburu, the war lasted from 1424 to 1425. According to the north-American archaeologist and anthropologist John Howland Rowe, the attack took place in 1438. The Peruvian ethno-historian María Rostworowski thought the conflict was fought at the beginning of the 15th century. The Peruvian sociologist and political militant Manuel Dammert wrote the event most likely took place somewhere between 1430 and 1440.

== Antecedents ==
The conflict between Incas and Chancas started during the reign of Inca Roca. The Chankas, taking advantage of the disorder following Inca Roca's coup d'état, conquered the Andahuaylas region whose inhabitants were allies of the Incas. However, Inca Roca quickly reconquered the region. After Yahuar Huacac's regicide, the Chankas used the subsequent disorder to their advantage again to retake the region. The conflict over the Andahuaylas region continued until the Chanka attack on Cuzco.

According to María Rostworowski, citing González Carré, the rivalry with the Chancas could have had its origins in the fall of the Wari State, whose collapse was potentially due to attacks by Chanca groups, who were less developed but apt for warfare.

== War ==
During the reign of Viracocha Inca, the Chanka armies left their territory, around 1430, to conquer Cusco. Their forces were divided into three, in respect to the ancient tradition of the Andes. One army, led by Astu Huaraca and Tumay Huaraca, was heading towards Cusco, while the other two were in charge of conquering Kuntisuyu, one being led by the generals Malma and Irapa, and the other being led by Yana Vilca and Teclo Vilca.

In Cusco, Viracocha Inca had given political and military command to his co-ruler and intended successor, Inca Urco, while the Chanka armies were stationed near Rimac Tampu, in Vilcacunga or Vilcacuna. At the time, an internal conflict opposed the ruling religious caste to the class of warrior chieftains or sinchis. From Vilcacunga, the Chankas sent emissaries informing the Incas of their invasion, which led Viracocha Inca and his sons Urco and Socso to take refuge in the fort of Caquia Xaquixaguana near Cusco. Cusi Yupanqui, according to some chroniclers Viracocha's son, stayed to defend Cusco with the help of Viracocha's generals Apo Mayta, Vicaquirao, and Quiliscachi Urco Guaranga, and a group of nobles and servants. The numbers of eight defendors indicated by colonial documents and four main figures were important in Inca social structure and cosmology. The Canas and the Canchis, to the south of Cusco, allied with the Inca, while the Ayarmaca allied with the Chanka. But the majority of the surrounding chiefdoms waited to see the outcome of the war.

In Susurpuquio, according to some colonial accounts, Pachacuti had a vision of the creator deity Viracocha, who predicted his victory, a detail which, according to ethno-historian María Rostworowski, "has a remarkably European flavor, since Andean tradition would require offerings of numerous sacrifices … to obtain the oracle". Because of this vision, some colonial chroniclers have associated Pachacuti with the institution of Viracocha as the principal deity, while others have described Pachacuti as the founder of the Inti sun cult, to the detriment of older deities such as Viracocha. According to Catherine Julien, Pachacuti's vision was originally attributed to the solar supernatural, but was later associated with Viracocha, the latter potentially being an invention post-dating European conquest.

=== Attack of Cusco ===
The Chanka forces, convinced of their victory, attacked Cusco. However, against previous expectations, the Inca managed to defeat the Chankas, who were forced to retreat. Cusi Yupanqui, wanting to annihilate the Chanka chiefdom, led his armies into Chanka territory to win a decisive victory.

=== Battle of Yahuar Pampa ===
The two armies met at the village of Ichupampa, where a battle ensued, which the Incas won. This victory established Inca dominance over the region.

=== Inca conquest ===
When Cusi Yupanqui became emperor, his first act was to lead a military campaign against the previous allies and confederates of the Chankas. After having conquered the old Chanka territory he organized a triumph in Cusco.
