= Palace economy =

Type of economic system

A palace economy or redistribution economy is a system of economic organization in which a substantial share of the wealth flows into the control of a centralized administration, the palace, and out from there to the general population. In turn the population may be allowed its own sources of income but relies heavily on the wealth distributed by the palace. It was traditionally justified on the principle that the palace was most capable of distributing wealth efficiently for the benefit of society. The temple economy (or temple-state economy) is a similar concept.

The concept of economic distribution is at least as old as the advent of the pharaohs. Anthropologists have noted many such systems, from those of tribesmen engaged in common subsistence economies of various sorts to complex civilizations, such as that of the Inca Empire, which assigned segments of the economy to specific villages. The essence of the idea is that a central administration plans production, assigns elements of the population to carry it out, collects the goods and services thus created, and redistributes them to the producers.

A palace economy is a specific type of distribution system in which the economic activities of the civilization are conducted on or near the premises of central administration complexes, the palaces of absolute monarchs, or a group of priests in temple-led versions. It is the function of the palace administration to supply the producers with the capital goods for the production of further goods and services, which are regarded as the property of the monarch. Typically this is not an altruistic undertaking. The palace is primarily interested in the creation of capital, which may then be disposed of as the ruler pleases. Some may become merchandising capital, to be sold or bartered for a profit, or some may be reinvested in further centers, including additional production facilities, wars (economic activities from which a profit is expected to be extracted), favorable alliances, fleets, and mastery of the seas.

In ancient palace systems, the producers were typically part of the working capital. From highest to lowest, they were tied to the palace economy by bonds of involuntary servitude or patronage. Any investment in a war would be expected to bring a return of plunder and prisoners, which became part of the endowment of the palace complex. The palace was responsible for meeting the expenses of the producers. It had to provide food, clothing and shelter, which it often did on the premises.

== Etymology ==
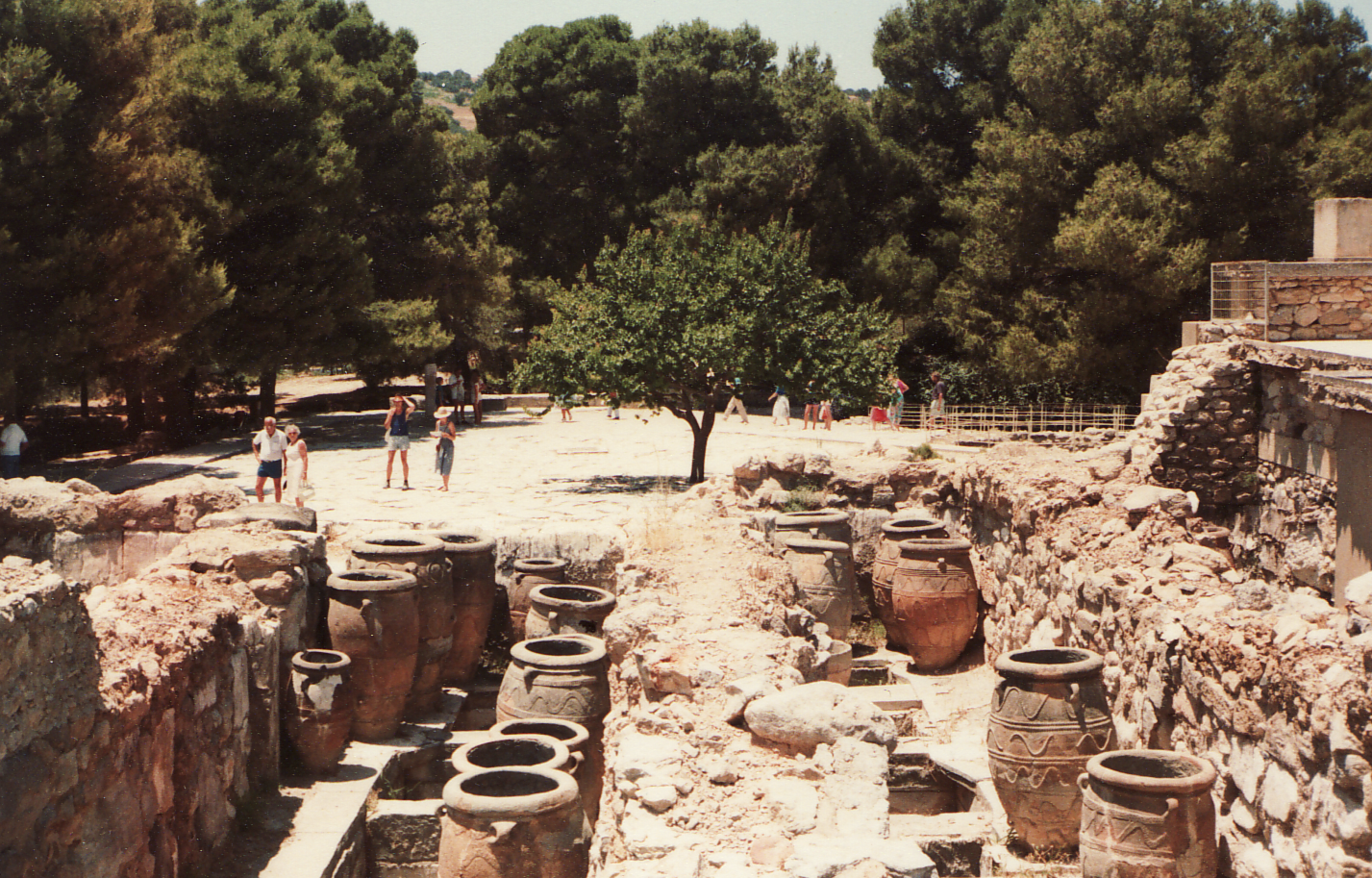
Storage "magazine" with pithoi, Palace of Knossos.

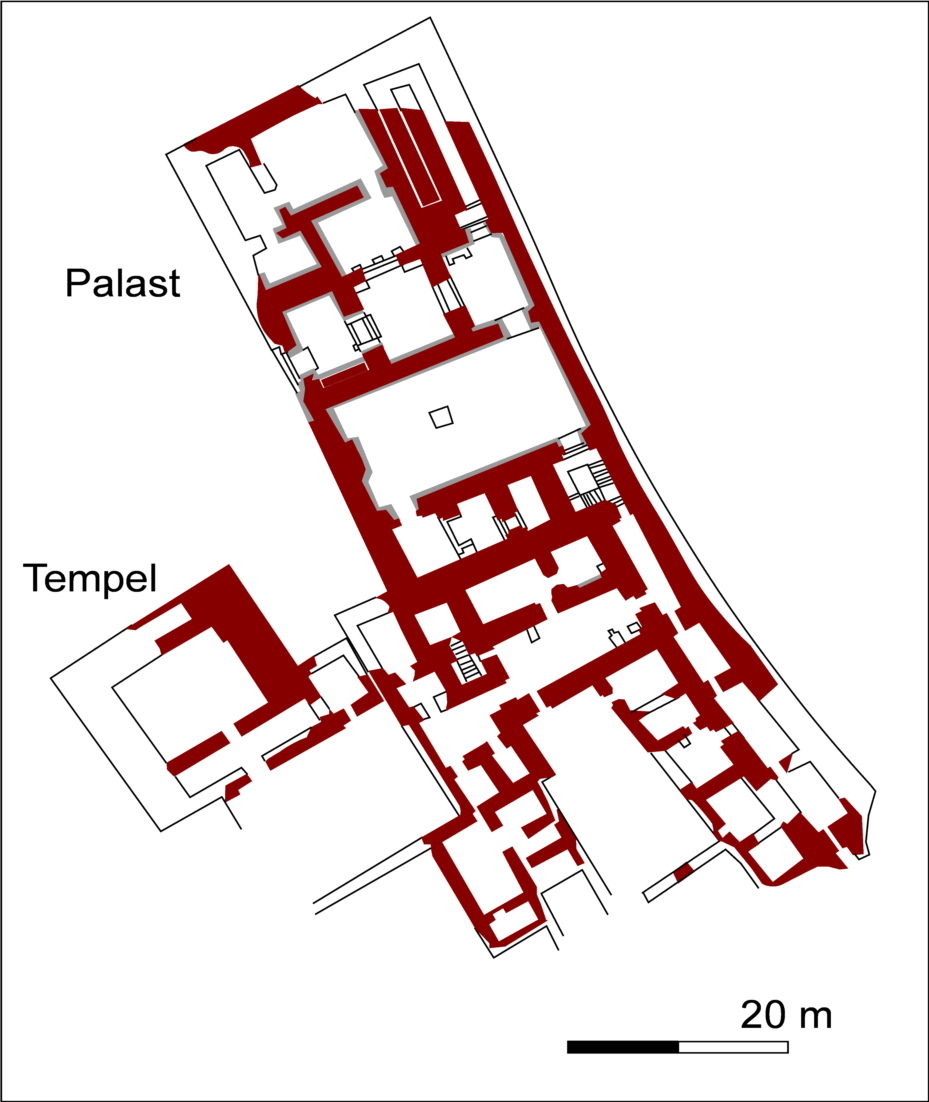
Palace at Alalakh

The thread leading to the current use of the terms came from the study of the palaces of the Minoan and Mycenaean civilizations, which flourished in the Late Bronze Age on Crete and mainland Greece respectively. The term palace economy began as a label for the economic activities of individual palaces, which contained very large areas for the storage of agricultural produce. For example, Sir Arthur Evans would refer to the palace economy, meaning the economy of the palace of Knossos. Others followed suit, without fully exploring what sort of economy that might be.

In 1956 Ventris and Chadwick published an idea that they had been considering previously:

Nor is there any evidence in the tablets of anything approaching currency. Every commodity is listed separately, and there is never any sign of equivalence between one unit and another.

Contemporaneously M. Finley had noticed the evidence of redistribution in the tablets and sought to understand how that could occur in those pre-currency times. In The World of Odysseus he noted that most distribution was internal:

All the production work, the seeding and harvesting and milling and weaving, even the hunting and raiding, though carried on by individuals, was performed on behalf of the household as a whole ... and from the centre they were redistributed ...

Finley further hypothesized that gift-giving, "the basic organizing mechanism among many primitive peoples", had been developed into a system of exchange, without prices, and dependent on the ad hoc valuation of the exchangers:

The act of giving was ... always the first half of a reciprocal action, the other half of which was a counter-gift.

Finley's observations were immediately and almost universally accepted; however, some reservations developed over the decades since then. Mycenaean ships were sent out from the palace complexes laden with ceramics, oils, perfumes and other goods precisely as though they were exports for sale, rather than gift-giving.

Like the other archaeologists of the time, Ventris did not use the term palace economy for anything more than the day-to-day economics of the palace, although Ventris and Chadwick did remark on the "similarities in the size and organization of the royal palaces" of Nuzi, Alalakh and Ugarit. Similarly, Finley in the late 1950s did not refer to his system as a palace economy. The status of the word had changed by 1960, when historical theorists had put the two together.

Exactly who was the first is unclear, but the best candidate is Karl Polanyi, the economic typologist, then toward the end of his life and at the peak of his career. He endorsed Finley's work and went further. In the 1960 compendium, City Invincible, written before 1958, he recalled Ventris stating that currency was absent from the tablets: "Michael Ventris ... has asserted the absence of money in the palace economy of Mycenaean Greece." Ventris did not refer to Mycenaean Greece as a palace economy himself, making Finley's paraphrasing an early example of this usage. Following this, many theorists began using the term. Grahame Clark (1961) wrote of a "palace economy introduced from Crete". Chester Starr (1961) said "Artisans and peasants were largely embraced in a palace economy under royal control". Leonard R. Palmer (1963) referred to the "highly centralized 'palace economy'" of Knossos and Pylos.

By 1965, the concept of a palace economy was being applied widely to Aegean and Near and Middle Eastern civilizations of the Late Bronze Age. It became such a fixture that subsequently it was applied to modern economic system types. There was, however, a notable abstention. Chadwick, who inherited the work and tradition of Ventris, in The Mycenaean World (1976), notably does not refer to a palace economy. Instead he implies questions, such as

... it is not so clear how small a palace can be ... What we can infer from the palace buildings is that there are administrative centres ... each centre of administration implies an administrator, whether he be an independent monarch, a semi-autonomous prince, or a local baron ...

This implication that the palace economy model might be simplistic foreshadowed the current trend. Halstead summarizes a forum begun by Nakassis and others as follows:

The term 'redistribution' has been used with a range of meanings in the context of the Aegean Bronze Age and so obscures rather than illuminates the emergence and functioning of political economies.

== Mediterranean and Near Eastern Bronze Age ==
=== Cretan civilization ===
==== Middle Minoan Crete ====
As early as the Middle Bronze Age, roughly the first half of the 2nd millennium BC, the eastern Mediterranean was dominated by a civilization named Minoan by its discoverer, Sir Arthur Evans, excavating the Palace of Knossos, which he termed the Palace of Minos. The civilization was maritime, its fleets were legendary, its settlements were mainly coastal, and its operations were mainly peaceful. There are legends, such as that of Theseus and the Minotaur, which indicate that tribute of some sort was collected by Crete from overseas locations, but its legendary history is far different from the wars and warriors of the mainland.

The evolution of palatial structures, if that is what they were, began on Crete in the Middle Minoan (MM) period of the Middle Bronze Age. The beginning of what Shaw calls "the big three" – Knossos, Phaestos, Malia – is dated to MMI, but others began in MMII. The relationships between all the foundings remain unknown, but a single foundation act is now to be ruled out.

The type of economic system prevailing on Crete and presumably wherever Cretan influence reached is very well documented by hundreds of tablets found at multiple locations in Crete. Only the persistent resistance of the writing script, Linear A, to decipherment prevents these documents from being read, and the information they contain assimilated. Consequently, nothing is known about the economy beyond what can be deduced from the archaeology or inferred by drawing risky parallels to the information presented in Late Bronze Age documents, which can be read. That the Minoans, as Evans called them in the absence of knowledge of their real name or names, may have had a palace economy is pure speculation.

==== Late Minoan Crete ====
The economy of the Minoan civilization depended on the cultivation of wheat, olives, grapes and other products and also supported several industries such as the textile, pottery and metalwork industries. Some of the manufacturing industries were based in the palaces. Produce from surrounding farmland was collected, recorded, and stored in the palaces as seen from the large number of storerooms and pithoi (storage jars) recovered. The palaces appear to have had an extent of control over overseas trade. The discovery of Linear A and Linear B tablets, listing commodities in the archive areas of the Palace of Knossos, suggests a highly organised bureaucracy and a system of record keeping that controlled all incoming and outgoing products.

=== Other locations ===
The palace economies in Ancient Egypt, Mesopotamia, Anatolia, and the Levant were waning in the late Bronze Age, being replaced by primitive market economies led by private merchants or officials who owned private businesses on the side. The last holdout and epitome of the palace system was Mycenaean Greece which was completely destroyed during the Bronze Age collapse and the following Greek Dark Ages.

== Asia ==
The mandala model for describing the patterns of diffuse political power in early Southeast Asian history, originated by O. W. Wolters 1982, does not address economic issues. Following British agent John Crawfurd's Siam mission in 1822, his journal describes a "palace economy" that he attributes to rapacity. His mission was delayed at the port of Pak Nam until he had given a satisfactory account of gifts to the palace, ending with interrogation into minute details with regard to the gift of a horse, which Crawfurd considered "but a good specimen of the indelicacy and rapacity which we afterwards found so characteristic of the Siamese Court and its officers, upon every question of a similar nature". This situation began the change to a market economy with the Bowring Treaty, negotiated by free-trade advocate Sir John Bowring with Siam's modernizing King Mongkut, signed on April 18, 1855.

== See also ==
- Byzantine economy
- Economic anthropology
