= Capac Yupanqui (general) =

Inca General

- Native name: Qhapaq Yupanki
- Born: Cusco
- Died: 15th century Cusco
- Allegiance: Inca Empire

Capac Yupanqui (From quechua Qhapaq Yupanki), was the brother of the Inca emperor Pachacuti and an Inca general.

== Biography ==
He was the son of Viracocha Inca and Mama Runtu.

=== Chanka attack ===
In the Chanka attack against Cusco he aided his brother Pachacuti against the Chanka, while his father Viracocha fled to Calca.

During the reign of his brother he was an important general in the Inca army alongside Huayna Yupanqui. One of his first tasks as general was defeating and subjecting the former allies of the Chanka.

=== Conquests ===
Capac Yupanqui was sent by Pachacuti to the central Peruvian coast in order to conquer the Chincha.

Years later the Sapa Inka sent his brother to various campaigns to the north of Cusco.

During these campaigns he conquered the Cajamarca region, ruled by the chiefdom of Guzmango, accidentally starting a war with Chimor.

It is during these campaigns that the Chanka, who were a part the Inca armies, fled beyond the borders of the Inca Empire.

Some historians believe that these campaigns were closer to raids than actual conquests, indicating that Capac Yupanqui wanted to overthrow his brother on returning from a successful campaign.

=== Execution ===
Because of several transgressions of Pachacuti's orders, his entry into conflict with the Chimú empire, and the escape of the Chanka forces, he was executed on his return to Cusco. Other sources indicate that Pachacuti was jealous of the success his brother had in the northern campaigns.
