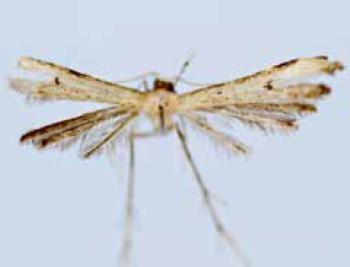

Scientific classification
- Kingdom: Animalia
- Phylum: Arthropoda
- Class: Insecta
- Order: Lepidoptera
- Family: Pterophoridae
- Genus: Hellinsia
- Species: H. tupaci

Binomial name
- Hellinsia tupaci Gielis, 2011

= Hellinsia tupaci =

Species of moth

Hellinsia tupaci is a moth of the family Pterophoridae. It is found in Ecuador.

Adults are on wing in December.

== Etymology ==
The species is named after the Inca prince Tupac Yupanqui.
