= Topa Inca Yupanqui =

Tenth emperor of the Inca Empire (before 1471 – 1493)

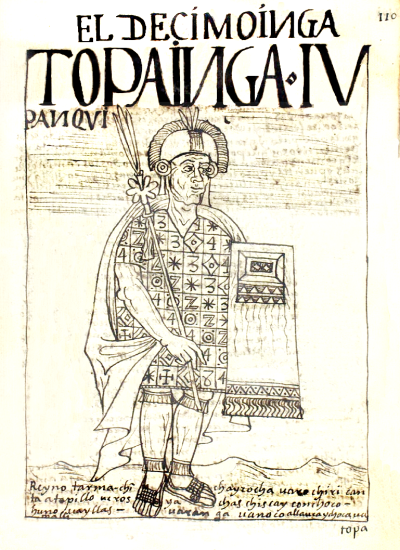
- Drawing by Guaman Poma in 1615, which says: El decimo inga Topa Inga Ivpanqvi "The tenth Inca - Topa Inca Yupanqui"

Sapa Inca of the Inca Empire
- Reign: 1471–1493
- Predecessor: Pachacuti
- Successor: Huayna Capac
- Born: before 1471; Cusco, Inca Empire
- Died: 1493; Chincheros, Inca Empire
- Consort: Mama Ocllo
- Issue: Huayna Capac
Names
- Túpac Inca Yupanqui
- Quechua: Tupa Inka Yupanki or Thupaq Inka Yupanki
- Spanish: Túpac Inca Yupanqui
- Dynasty: Hanan Qusqu
- Father: Pachacuti
- Mother: Mama Anahuarque

Topa Inca Yupanqui or Túpac Inca Yupanqui (Cusco Quechua: Thupa Inka Yupanki, pronounced [ˈtʰupa ˈiŋka juˈpaŋki]), also Topa Inga Yupangui, erroneously translated as "noble Inca accountant" (before 1471 – 1493) was the tenth Sapa Inca (1471–1493) of the Inca Empire, fifth of the Hanan dynasty. His father was Pachacuti, and his son was Huayna Capac. Topa Inca belonged to the Qhapaq Panaca (one of the clans of Inca nobles). His quya (principal wife) was his older sister, Mama Ocllo.

== Biography ==
Inca expansion under the reign of Tupac Yupanqui in yellow

His father appointed him to head the Inca army before his reign as emperor, granting him the title of Auqui, or crown prince, at a young age. Topa Inca launched multiple large-scale expeditions to the north during his period as Auqui, subduing regions such as Hatun Xauxa, the Bombon Plateau, and Huaylas. Cities and sites the army he commanded besieged and captured at this time include Curamba, Huaylla-Pucara, Canta, and, most importantly, Chan Chan. He extended the realm along the Andes through modern Ecuador, and developed a special fondness for the city of Quito, which he rebuilt with architects from Cusco. During this time his father Pachacuti reorganized the kingdom of Cusco into the Tawantinsuyu, the "region of four provinces". Topa Inca led extensive military conquests to extend the Inca empire across much of Southern America.

He became Sapa Inca (sole ruler) in his turn upon his father's death in 1471, ruling until his own death in 1493. He conquered Chimor, which occupied the northern coast of what is now Peru, the largest remaining rival to the Incas.

He conquered the province of Antisuyu and subdued the Qulla people. He imposed rules and taxes, creating two Suyuyoc Apu (Governor Generals), one in Jauja and the other in Tiwanaku. The fortress Saksaywaman, established by Pachacuti on the high plateau above Cusco, was constructed throughout Topa Inca Yupanqui's reign.

Topa Inca died about 1493 in Chincheros, leaving two legitimate sons and 90 illegitimate sons and daughters. Chuqui Ocllo, one of the wives of Topa Yupanqui, convinced him that his son Capac Huari would succeed him, however, Topa Inca Yupanqoi changed his mind and decided on his son Titu Cusi Hualpa (who would later become emperor Huayna Capac). This provoked anger in Chuqui Ocllo and she poisoned Topa Inca. She and her favorite son were both killed soon after Topa Inca's death.

== The Pacific Expedition ==
=== Original account ===
Topa Inca Yupanqui is also credited with leading a roughly 10-month-long voyage of exploration into the Pacific around 1470, under the reign of his father, reportedly visiting islands he called Nina Chumpi ("fire belt") and Hawa Chumpi ("outer belt"), also spelled Avachumpi, Hahua chumpi). The voyage is mentioned in the History of the Incas by Pedro Sarmiento de Gamboa, as well as in the works of Martín de Murúa and Miguel Cabello de Balboa. Pedro Sarmiento described the expedition as follows:

:...there arrived at Tumbez some merchants who had come by sea from the west, navigating in balsas with sails. They gave information of the land whence they came, which consisted of some islands called Avachumbi and Ninachumbi, where there were many people and much gold. Topa Inca was a man of lofty and ambitious ideas, and was not satisfied with the regions he had already conquered. So he determined to challenge a happy fortune, and see if it would favour him by sea...

The Inca, having this certainty, determined to go there. He caused an immense number of balsas to be constructed, in which he embarked more than 20,000 chosen men...

Topac Inca navigated and sailed on until he discovered the islands of Avachumbi and Ninachumbi, and returned, bringing back with him slaves, gold, a chair of brass, and a skin and jaw bone of a horse. These trophies were preserved in the fortress of Cusco until the Spaniards came. The duration of this expedition undertaken by Topa Inca was nine months, others say a year, and, as he was so long absent, every one believed he was dead.

– "¿Viajaron los Incas por Oceanía?" Revista Enraizada, in Spanish, 2020.

=== Analysis ===
Historians and anthropologists such as María Rostworowski, Waldemar Espinoza, José Antonio del Busto Duthurburu and Jean Hervé Daude, believe that the two islands mentioned by the chroniclers are Mangareva and Easter Island, where oral traditions have claimed that a group of long-eared hanau eepe came to the island from an unknown land. Some historians, however, are skeptical that the voyage ever took place.

== See also ==
- Pre-Columbian rafts

Regnal titles
Preceded by Pachacuti	Sapa Inca; 1471 – 1493	Succeeded by Huayna Capac
