= Economy of the Inca Empire =

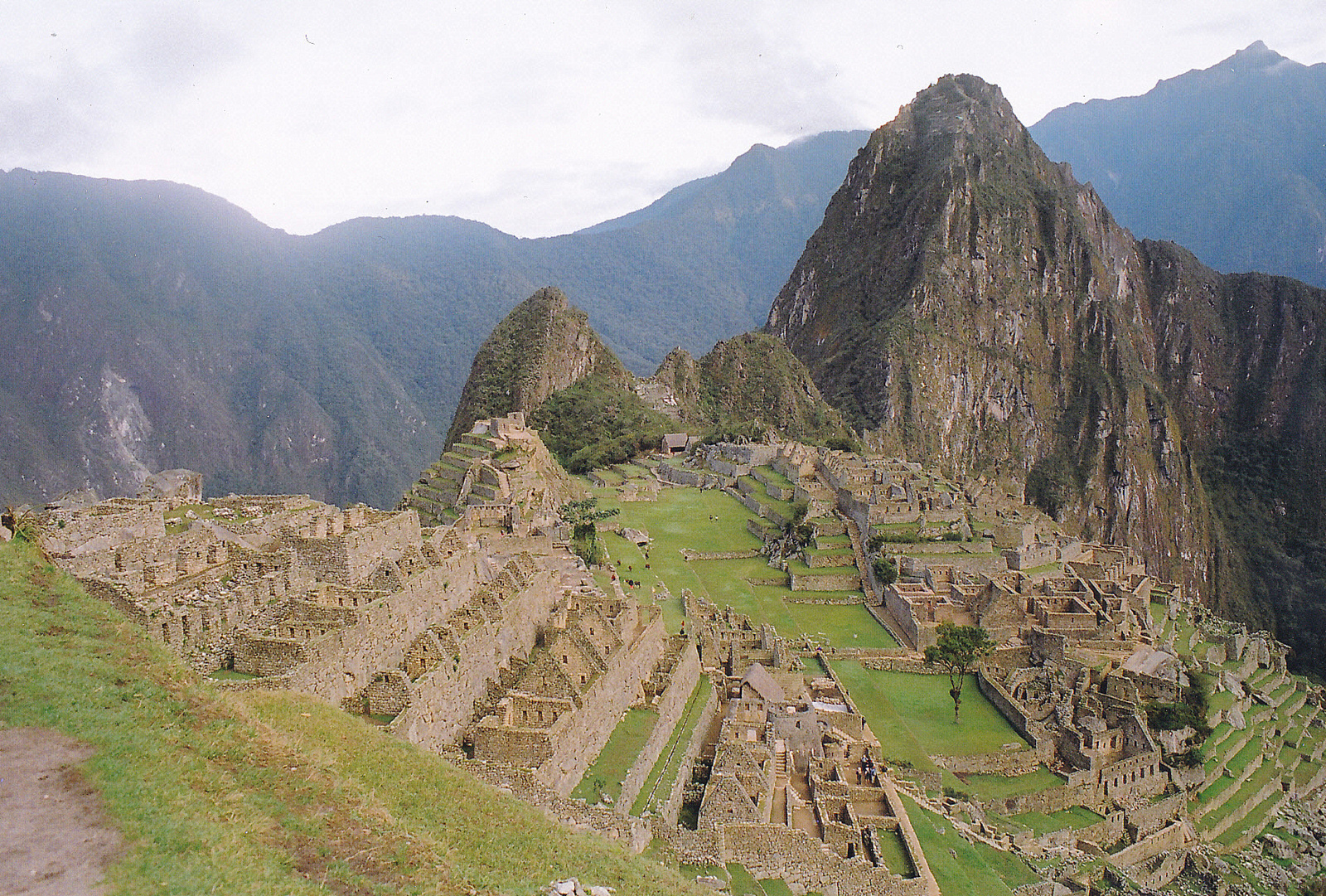
Machu Picchu in Peru

The economy of the Inca Empire, which lasted from 1438 to 1532, established an economic structure that allowed for substantial agricultural production as well as the exchange of products between communities. It was based on the institution of reciprocity, considered the socioeconomic and political system of the Pre-Columbian Andes. This model has been variously described by scholars throughout the 20th century, but an academic consensus has emerged using the general frameworks of Austrian economist Karl Polanyi.

Inca society is considered to have had some of the most successful centrally organized economies in history. Its effectiveness was achieved through the successful control of labor and the regulation of tribute resources. In Inca society, collective labor was the cornerstone for economic productivity and the achieving of common prosperity. Members of an ayllu (the basic unit of socio-territorial organisation) developed various traditions of solidarity to adapt to the Andean environment. The economic prosperity of the Inca State caused the Spanish conquerors to be impressed by the foreign forms of organisation. According to each ayllu, labor was divided by region, with agriculture centralized in the most productive areas; ceramic production, road construction, textile production, and other skills were also tasks distributed among members of an ayllu. After local needs were satisfied, the state apparatus gathered all surplus that is gathered from ayllus and allocated it where it was needed. Populations of local chiefdoms in the Inca Empire received clothes, food, health care, and schooling in exchange for their labour.

The economic organisation was based on local traditions of "solidarity" and "mutualism", transported to an imperial scale. The Sapa Inca governed by means of personal relations with the rulers of the local states, adopting the ethnological concept of "reciprocity" or "exchange".

== Classification ==
The Inca economy has been the subject of scholarly debate. Darrell E. La Lone, in his work 1982 The Inca as a Nonmarket Economy, noted that 20th Century scholars have previously described it as "feudal, slave, [or] socialist", as well as "a system based on reciprocity and redistribution; a system with markets and commerce; or an Asiatic mode of production."

In the 1960s, John Victor Murra criticised the welfare-hypothesis as a "socialist illusion", and theorised a redistributive model named the "vertical archipelago" based on the substantivist economist Karl Polanyi. This model has seen widespread acceptance, but has also been criticised. The ethno-historian María Rostworowski has argued that vertical redistribution was subordinated to the horizontal system of reciprocity. According to Chris Beyers, the substantivist framework can continue to be used, but it needs to be revised.

== Reciprocity ==
The custom of reciprocity was the foundation of the socio-economic ties of chiefdoms in large parts of the Americas, in the Pre-Columbian Andes, the "intermediary zone" stretching from the Colombian Andes to the Caribbean, Mesoamerica, and north-America, where the Potlach ceremony took place. The custom of reciprocity is observable worldwide, and other cases are notably found in Oceania.

In anthropology, the term "chiefdom" describes a non-egalitarian society of hunter-horticulturists, founded on rules of reciprocity (obligation to give, to receive, and to give back), and composed of multiple lineages in a hierarchy, at the top of which was a chief. In the Andes, the system of reciprocity and redistribution was likely installed by the Wari State, between 500 and 800, who based the system on the exploitation of several vertical eco-zones of the Andes by local communities to limit the activity of merchant networks and markets. This system of exploitation of multiple eco-zones to access resources and avoid climate catastrophes has later been named "territorial discontinuity" or "vertical archipelago". While basic necessity products circulated through tribute, merchants, especially maritime ones, continued to sell luxury products for the chiefs and priesthood. This model of reciprocity represented a network of economic exchange and commercial relations, that contradicts previous theories of socialist thinkers that there was no system of exchange of goods and services within the Inca Empire. All institutions of labour and social classes were founded on relations of reciprocity, the idea that "each service […] lent called for a return". By giving something, an individual "proved his economic and moral capacity to separate from his possessions", and the act was seen as a sign of altruism. According to rules of etiquette, the giver presented his demand as a request, however it was meant as an order. Receiving a gift established trust, and implicitly obligated the receiver to engage himself to give a similar service back. In some circumstances, "asymmetrical reciprocity" was practiced, notably between individuals of different rank, where an individual gave a service to receive a service different from the original one back. Due to this inequality, some modern ethnologists describe the phenomenon as "exchange" rather than "reciprocity". The French anthropologist and sociologist Marcel Mauss was an important figure in studying reciprocity in the Americas, as well as the Ukrainian-American anthropologist John V. Murra who coined the term "vertical archipelago". Nathan Wachtel finds that an early form of reciprocity, practiced locally, that served ideological functions to justify new social relations, was later replaced under Inca rule by a reciprocity that served the growth of the state apparatus. The Inca state benefited from its subjects' services, and redistributed the accumulated surpluses. Reciprocity, a horizontal form of interaction between local peoples and the central state, was combined with redistribution, a vertical form of interaction between central authority and local entities, and the former was the ideological justification for the latter. According to Nathan Wachtel in La Vision des vaincus, the Inca state economy is defined as "the combination of two principles: those of reciprocity and redistribution", theoretically opposed but complementary, as "two movements, centripetal and centrifugal, define economic life: Gathering of products from the groups to the center, then distribution of the products from the center to the groups".

The Inca state was not the utopia imagined by Europeans however, as most redistributed products were "consumed by the system of reciprocity, by which the state was under constant obligation to renew great "gifts" to the various ethnic lords, military chiefs, the huacas. [...] To meet these obligations, a system of state storehouses was built". According to the Peruvian ethno-historian María Rostworowski, the Inca state depended on "enormous quantities of accumulated goods", and without these, "it would not be able to meet either administrative requirements or the constant demand for "gifts" required by the institution of reciprocity".

== Redistributive system ==
The basis of the Andean socio-political organisation was the ayllu, a group of families united by real or mythical kin ties, and separated into a male and a female line. The ruler of an ayllu was the kuraka, or chief, called kamachikuq, and was part of the class of common people ("Hatunruna").

Each ayllu owned a marka, or village. The vertical archipelago, adopted by the Lupaqa chiefdom, was occasionally used by the Inca Emperors. Depending on its geographical position, each ayllu was specialized in exploiting certain eco-regions. Agricultural ayllus were situated near fertile land and grew crops that were suited to the soil type. Their production would be taken by the state apparatus, who would then transfer it to other regions of the country where the resource was unavailable. Excess was kept in storage houses near urban centers, along roads and highways. Other ayllus would specialize in pottery, clothes, or jewelry production; skills were passed on from generation to generation within the same ayllu.

According to Valensi, cited by María Rostworowski, redistribution occurs in societies functioning around a political center, "that collects goods, stores and redistributes them to reward its supporters". Reciprocity, which "intervenes in the production, labor services, and periodic distribution of lands, as well as in the apportionment of goods produced, in the practice of gift-giving", can be combined with redistribution, as reciprocity is the horizontal and redistribution the vertical model of relations between local peoples and central authority.

=== Socio-political structures ===
The socio-territorial structures were scaffoldings of chiefdoms, organized pyramidally and segmentarilly, according to interpersonal relations (individualized and institutionalized) and possession of land (owned collectively).

Ayllus were federated into chiefdoms (also called curacazgos or huarangas), governed by kurakas called Apu kurakas, and small chiefdoms were organized into larger chiefdoms, governed by apu kurakas called Hatun kurakas. The grand chiefdoms, in adopting redistributive systems of reciprocal exchange (by exchanging liberalities, often in the form of feasts, for workforce, allegiances, and a significant reduction of sovereignty) with the local rulers, represented the highest level of integration reached in the pre-Hispanic Andes, while the Inca Empire did not introduce an imperial-wide integration, instead governing on the basis of local hierarchies. Inca expansion – possibly initiated by the acquisition of Chanka war booty following the Chanka–Inca War, which gave an initial economic advantage to the inca chiefdom — added a new sphere to the redistributive system established in the Andes, with the Inca ruler exchanging the newly acquired goods for the workforce and the allegiance of the neighbouring rulers, and therefore multiplying reciprocal relations and slowly dominating the local socio-economic system.

== Land possession in the Inca Empire ==
The land of an ayllu was owned collectively. As the ayllu's delegate, the kuraka redistributed the property among families. The land's measurements were calculated in tupus, a local measuring unit, and differed depending on the agricultural condition of the region.

A married pair would get one and a half tupus, with one tupu for each male child and half a tupu for each female child. When the children started their own family, the additional tupu was transferred to the family of the son or daughter. The property was used by the families of the ayllu, but they did not own it. The farm was used to supply the family with subsistence food.

== Collective labor tribute ==
Under the Inca Empire, officials routinely conducted a census of the male population to determine if labor conscription was necessary. Individuals, including adolescents, were obligated to work in different labor capacities on a revolving basis, whether it was livestock, building, or at home. Inca officials received two-thirds of a farmer's crops (over 20 varieties of corn and 240 varieties of potatoes).

This system of work was organized within the framework of institutionalized reciprocity, the Inca emperor was united by personal relations to the regional rulers. The Inca emperor regularly provided the local rulers with goods, and those partially redistributed those goods to the local people, providing them with housing, food, and clothing. In return, the commoners found themselves obligated towards their lords, and the lords towards the Inca emperor. The free allocation of ceremonial beer was one of the special incentives. For this institutionalized generosity, Inca bureaucracy used a specific open space in the city's center as a social gathering place for local lords to celebrate and drink ritual beer. With the creation of the Inca Empire, exchanging goods for human energy became a fundamental aspect of unified Inca rule.

Collective reciprocal labor may be structured in three ways: The first was the ayni, which served to assist members and families of the society in need; the second was the minka, or collective effort for the good of the whole community, and included the construction of public works; the mita, or tribute charged to the Inca, was the third, and served as a state-wide minka rotational and temporary service, constructing important public structures, and being principally used by inca bureaucracy. This structure was a give-and-take system, based on the reciprocal exchange of "gifts" in an institutionalized exchange. This scheme required the Inca Empire to be in possession of the goods necessary for sociopolitical and economic domination, and redistribution based on need and local interests.

== Quipu, record-keeping system ==
A well-kept example of quipu from the Inca Empire on display at the Larco Museum.

Despite the lack of a written language, the Incas invented a system of record-keeping simple and stereotyped information based on knotted string known as quipu. To describe the decimal system, these knot structures used complex knot arrangements and color-coded parts. These cords were used to keep track of their stored goods, available workforce, valuable things such as maize, which was used to craft ceremonial beer, and potentially historical information based on stereotyped "messages" related to oral "narrations". The quipu controlled every economic part of the large empire. Those in charge of keeping the documentation via the quipu were called quipucamayocs. There are 1,500 strings on the largest quipu. The Sacred City of Caral-Supe has the oldest quipu, which dates from about 2500 BC.

== Currency in Incan Economy ==
Money was not used in most Inca territories, though currencies are documented on the northern and central Andean coast. Rather, a person's labor was "rewarded with the guarantee of future mutual assistance and social standing", which represented giving labor prestations rather than "taxes". Over time, the Inca Empire could not be "a total stranger to systems of private exchange", and an "Andean pre-Hispanic Market developed, of which the state would have been the guarantor". For part of the scientific community though, the label "market" does not accurately describe the Inca economy, and has a different meaning to the one used in the economy of Western cultures.

== Trading system in Inca Empire ==
Land could be controlled by each seemingly large family. To plow, sow seeds, and later harvest the crops, individuals required additional labor prestations from the family members. A similar method known as "minka" was used for larger-scale cooperative work, such as the construction of houses or other infrastructure. Participants were compensated in kind. This system is still in use in some Quechua cultures of the Andes. The philosophical, metaphysical principle that underpinned the concepts of "ayllus" and "minka" was known as "ayni", an ancient Andean idea of mutualism and reciprocity. Because every entity in the society was seen as interconnected, each member voluntarily participated in their labor and production, expecting to be offered something in return later. In a world without monetary currencies, the concept of ayni may have been applied to all mutual transfers of energy and commodities between people and nature. In addition, the central Inca government instituted supply management and a taxation structure. As a levy, each resident was forced to give the Inca rulers a time of labor and a portion of their cultivated crops. As a result, surplus crops were taken by the government and distributed to villages in desperate need of food. These local systems of mutual aid and solidarity created various obligations and rights, and were originally created to adapt to the harsh environment of the Andes mountains.

In the absence of currency, foreign trade was rare and exceptional. The "mindalae" on the Ecuadorian coast were merchant corporations in charge of trade. Another exception was the chiefdom of Chincha on the central Peruvian coast, where a social class of merchants had developed. Long-distance trade happened punctually with Polynesia and western Mexico. In addition, there was a trading fair in Cusco, called catu, which happened annually.

== Infrastructure system of the Inca Empire ==
Inca road system

Inca administration constructed and renovated very complex ancient networks of roads and bridges, known as Qhapaq Ñan, to improve the ability of the Inca to exert imperial authority. Inca engineers improved upon earlier cultures' highways, such as those built by the Chimu, Wari, and Tiwanaku, among others. Since 1994, UNESCO World Heritage Sites have preserved these roads and the Inca and pre-Inca structures next to them. There were two major roads that ran from north to south, one along the coast and the other along the Andes, with smaller networks of roads linking the two. The royal road on the Andes began in Quito, Ecuador, and ended near Tucuman, Argentina, after passing through Cajamarca and Cusco. The Andean Royal Road was more than 3,500 miles long, exceeding the length of the longest Roman path.

As the Incas had no horses nor wheel technology, the majority of traveling was done by foot, with llamas transporting merchandise from one section of the empire to the other. Messengers or chasquis used roads to transport messages throughout the empire. The Incas devised strategies for navigating the Andes' rugged terrain: There were stone steps that looked like massive flights of stairs on steep slopes, and low walls were constructed in desert regions to prevent sand from drifting across the lane.

== Bridge building ==
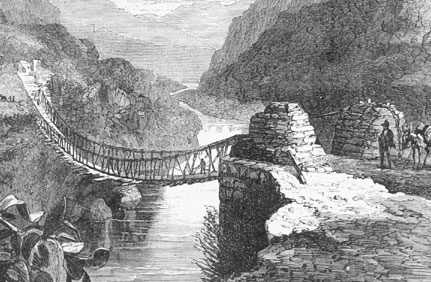
An example of Inca Bridge

To connect roads that crossed rivers and deep canyons in the Andes mountain range, various bridges were constructed in the Empire, with the help of natural fibers. The Inca empire's structure and economy necessitated the construction of these bridges. The fibers were tied together to form a rope that was as long as the bridge's desired length. Three of these ropes were braided together to make one stronger and longer rope; the ropes were braided until they met the required distance, weight, and power. The cables were then bound together with tree branches, and timber was applied to the floor to create a cable floor that was at least four to five feet high. The completed cable floor was then connected to abutments on either side that supported the ends. Ropes that acted as handrails were often fixed on all sides of the bridge. Near Cusco, in the town of Huarochiri, is the only remaining Inca suspension bridge.

== Communication in the Inca Empire ==
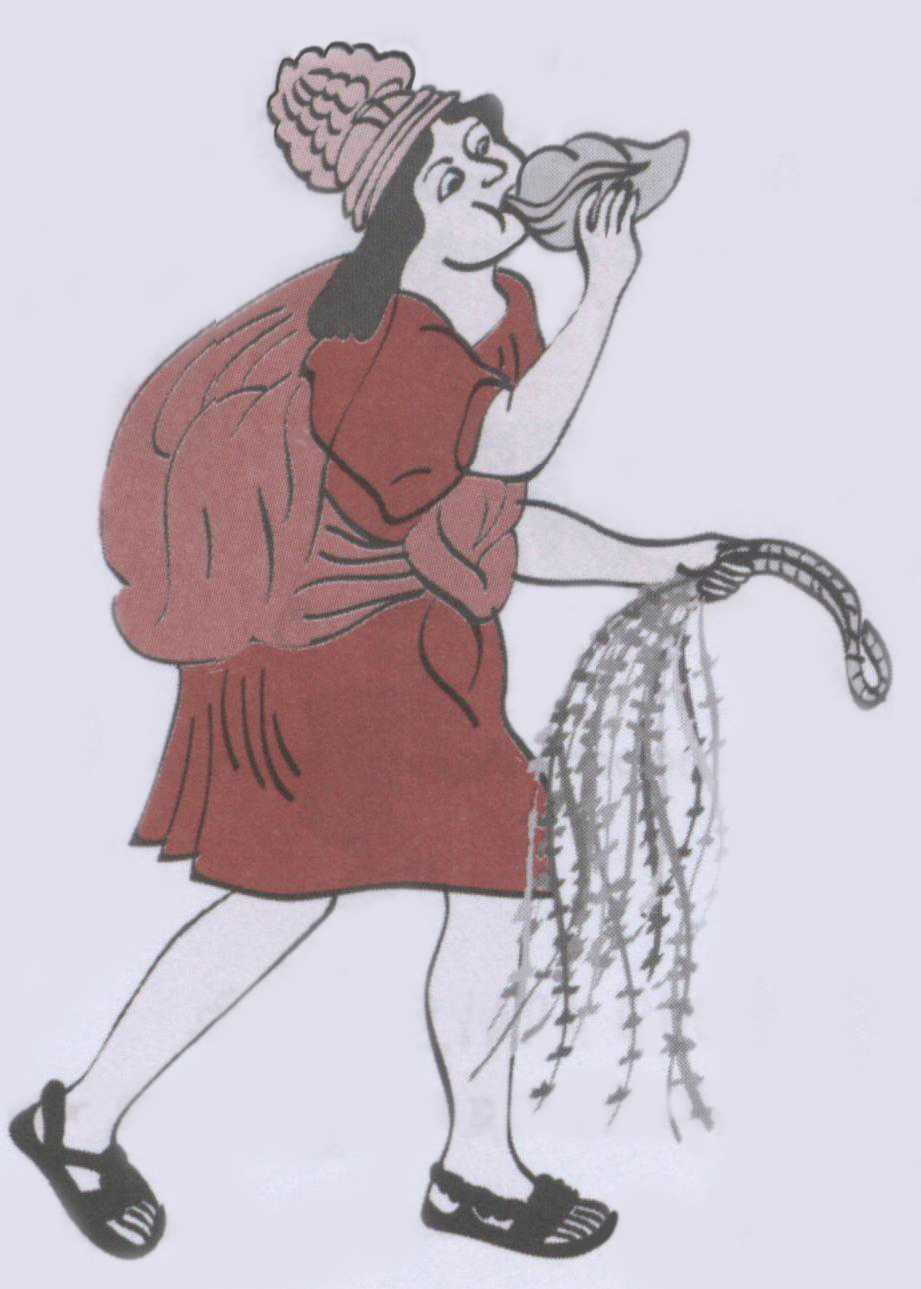
A chasqui with a quipu in his hand (by Felipe Guamán Poma de Ayala, 1616).

The Inca Empire developed a network of messengers to deliver important messages. The Chasquis, or messengers, were selected from among capable young men. They relayed signals over long distances, staying in communities of four or six in cabins or tambos along the roads. The chasqui covered certain distances, before reaching another messenger and handing them the message. Messages could travel around 250 miles a day in this manner. An immediate alert was transmitted via a chain of bonfires in the event of an attack or revolt. Before the source of the fire was understood, the Inca ruler would send his army near the bonfire, where he would learn the essence of the message. Some tambos, or relay sites, were more elaborate than others, according to archeological finds. They were most often used as rest stops for officials or the emperor.
