= Philip Ainsworth Means =

American anthropologist and author (1892–1944)

Philip Ainsworth Means (April 3, 1892 – November 24, 1944) was an American anthropologist, historian, and author. He was best known for his study of South America, specifically of the Inca Empire. Means made five extended trips to Peru where he studied the Incas of the Cuzco area and supervised excavations. He was the director of the National Museum of Archeology in Lima, Peru, and was associated with the Smithsonian Institution and the Peabody Museum of Archaeology and Ethnology. Means published many books, including Ancient Civilization of the Andes (1931), which became the standard textbook on Incan history and culture.

== Early life ==
Means was born in 1892 in Boston to parents Helen (née Fairnsworth) and James Godell Means. He attended the Pomfret School in Connecticut and the Noble and Greenough School in Massachusetts. He also traveled in Europe where he gained an interest in French and Spanish literature.

Means attended Harvard University, graduating in 1916 with a B.A. in anthropology. He received a Master of Arts from Harvard in 1916. He studied Hispanic America, combing archeology, history, and literature. He extended his studies by visiting museums and archives in Europe.

== Career ==
=== Peruvian expeditions ===
While still an undergraduate at Harvard, Means participated in the Yale–National Geographic Society expedition to Peru from 1914 to 1915. This eight-month-long trip under the direction of Hiram Bingham sparked his interest in the Inca Empire of the Cuzco region.

Means returned to Peru from 1917 through 1918 on behalf of the Wonalancet Company and several societies, visiting sites from Bolivia in the south to Piura on the far north coast of Peru. He was an honorary collaborator in archeology with the United States National Museum (now the Smithsonian Institution) from 1916 to 1919 and supervised expeditions in Piura in 1918 and 1919.

Means became the organizer and director of the National Museum of Archeology in Lima in 1920; however, he left this position in 1921 and returned to the United States when the Peruvian government failed to provide adequate funding. He became an associate in anthropology with the Peabody Museum of Archaeology and Ethnology at Harvard from 1921 to 1927. He then traveled throughout Latin America for eleven years.

Means took a historical approach to his studies by combining documentary and archaeological findings. He focused on the chronological advancement of artwork and textiles of a given culture. For example, he considered the Mochica or Early Chimu as slightly earlier than Nazca because its art was more fresh and youthful. He categorized textiles by technique and cultural period. Means believed Precolumbian art was worthy of recognition and supported its inclusion in art exhibits. He also contributed to the field of history by translating the writings of early chroniclers, including those of Pedro Sancho, Fernando Montesinos, Pedro Pizarro, and Francisco de Elorza y Rada.

In 1931, Means published his most renowned book, Ancient Civilizations of the Andes, a historical account of the Andes during the reign of the Inca Empire. It was followed in 1932 by the second book of his intended Inca trilogy, Fall of the Inca Empire and Spanish Rule in Peru, which focused on the territories of the modern republics of Ecuador, Peru, Bolivia, and portions of Colombia, Argentina, and Chile from 1530 to 1780 AD. For the most part, he wrote these two books in the United States, conducting research at the Harvard and Yale libraries.

Means returned to Peru in 1932 as an associate in anthropology for the Peabody Museum. His last trip to Peru was from 1933 to 1934. Because of the international success of Ancient Civilizations, Means received the Order of the Sun of Peru in 1933. He published The Spanish Main: Focus of Envy 1492–1700 in 1935, covering the Spanish colonial rule in northern South America during the 1700s, including Panama to Trinidad, and the waters along the coast. However, he died before finishing the third book of his Inca trilogy.

=== Newport Tower ===
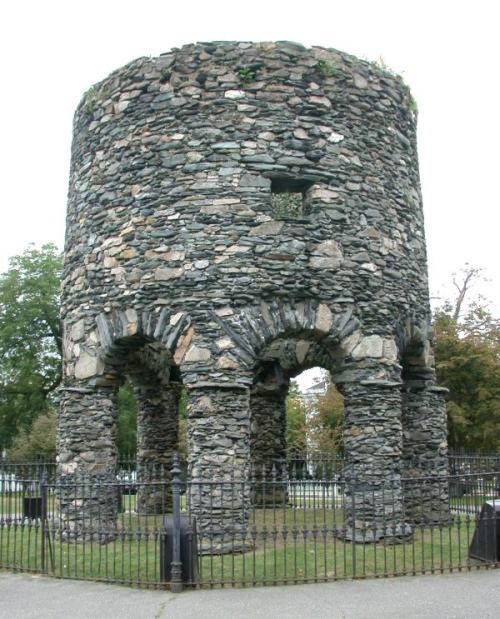
Newport Tower, Rhode Island

In 1942, Means published Newport Tower, a book about an unusual structure in Newport, Rhode Island. The Newport Tower is a circular stone structure that was thought by some to be evidence of ancient Vikings in the new world. The stone shell of the building is 24 feet (7.3 m) tall and was historically known as the Old Stone Mill of Governor Benedict Arnold. Scholars debated whether the tower was evidence of Norse Vikings or an abandoned windmill or tower from colonial times. The arguments for Viking construction were based primarily on architectural details, and Means decided to tackle the issue from a scholarly angle.

Although his book was well-researched and attempted to be unbiased, Means argued against a colonial origin for the tower and his pro-Norse stance is evident. He tentatively dated the tower to around A.D. 1120, give or take a hundred years but noted the need for an archaeological excavation. However, the Park Commission of Newport refused an excavation, fearing the tower would be damaged. Means recommended the Excavators Club at Harvard the job and predicted that there would be a 50% chance nothing would be found, a 35% chance of finding Norse material, a 10% chance that 17th-century construction would be confirmed, and a 5% chance the tower would date to A.D. 1492–1580.

After World War II, the Peabody Museum formed a committee to conduct an archaeological excavation of the tower. Harvard graduate student William S. Godfrey Jr., a direct descendant of Governor Arnold, worked on the project and concluded that the tower had no Norse history and was built around 1650, making it one of the oldest standing buildings in North America. The site's 17th-century artifacts included clay pipe fragments, gun flints, pottery, glass, and nails. However, Means remained skeptical of the date of the tower.

=== New York Times ===
Later in life, Means became a contributor and book reviewer for The New York Times.

== Personal life ==
In 1924, Means moved to Stockbridge, Massachusetts to write. Shortly afterward, he moved to Pomfret, Connecticut, his home base until his death. He married Louise Munroe on April 18, 1934. She accompanied him on his travels and helped with his publications.

Means died in Boston on November 24, 1944. He was buried in Pomfret.

== Select publications ==
=== Books ===
- Racial Factors in Democracy. Boston: Marshall Jones, 1918
- La Civilización Precolombina de los Andes. Quinto: Imprenta de la Universidad Central, 1919
- Distribution and Use of Slings in Pre-columbian America, with Descriptive Catalogue of Ancient Peruvian Slings in the United States National Museum. Washington, D.C.: U.S. Government Printing Office, 1917
- Ciertos aspectos de la rebelión de Túpac Amaru II, 1780–1781. Lima, Peru: Sanmarti y Ca., 1920
- Ancient Civilizations of the Andes. New York: Charles Scribner's Sons, 1931
- Fall of the Inca Empire and the Spanish Rule in Peru, 1530–1780. New York: Charles Scribner's Sons, 1932
- A Study of Peruvian Textiles. Boston: Museum of Fine Arts, 1932
- The Spanish Main: Focus of Envy, 1492–1700. New York: Charles Scribner's Sons, 1935
- The Incas, Empire Builders of the Andes. Press of Judd and Detweiler, 1938
- Pre-Columbian Art and Culture in the Andean Area. Rhode Island Museum Press, 1941
- Newport Tower. New York: Henry Holt and Company, 1942

=== Monographic series ===
- Preliminary Survey of the Remains of the Chippewa Settlements on La Pointe Island, Wisconsin. Smithsonian Miscellaneous Collections, vol. 66, no. 14 (January 1917)
- A History, of the Spanish Conquest of Yucatan and of the Itzas (Papers of the Peabody Museum of American Archaeology and Ethnology, Harvard University, vol. VII). Cambridge, MA: The University Press, 1917
- A Survey of Ancient Peruvian Art. Transactions of the Connecticut Academy of Arts and Sciences, vol 21 (May 1917): 314–442
- "An Outline of the Culture Sequence in the Andean Area." Proceedings of the 19th International Congress of Americanists (1917) pp. 236–52
- A Study of Ancient Andean Social Institutions. Transactions of the Connecticut Academy of Arts and Sciences, 1925
- Biblioteca Andina, Part One: Essays on the Lives and Works of the Chroniclers. Transactions of the Connecticut Academy of Arts and Sciences, vol. 29 (1928) 271–525

=== Journal articles ===
- "Some Objections to Mr. Elliot Smith's Theory." Science 44, no. 1137 (1916): 533–34
- "A Note on the Guarani Invasions of the Inca Empire." Geographical Review 4, no. 6 (1917): 482–84
- "Race and Society in the Andean Countries." The Hispanic American Historical Review 1, no. 4 (1918): 415–25
- "Race Appreciation and Democracy." The Journal of Race Development 9, no. 2 (1918): 180–88
- "Social Conditions in the Piura-Tumbes Region of Northern Peru." The Scientific Monthly 7, no. 5 (1918): 385–99
- "The Domestication of the Llama." Science 47, no. 1211 (1918): 268–69
- "Anthropological Notes." American Anthropologist 20, no. 2 (1918): 245–48
- "Pre-Columbian Peruvian Chronology and Cultures." Man 18 (1918): 168–69
- "The Rebellion of Tupac-Amaru II, 1780–1781." The Hispanic American Historical Review 2, no. 1 (1919): 1–25
- "Indian Legislation in Peru." The Hispanic American Historical Review 3, no. 4 (November 1920): 509–34
- "Aspectos, Cronológicos de las Civilizaciones Andinas", Boletin, de la Academla Nacional de Historia, vol. 1 (1921) 195–226
- "A New Anthropological Journal in Peru." American Anthropologist 25, no. 4 (1923): 579–80
- "Some Comments on the Inedited Manuscript of Poma de Ayala." American Anthropologist 25, no. 3 (1923): 397–405
- "Art in Peru Prior to the Incas." The Bulletin of the Cleveland Museum of Art 10, no. 8 (1923): 136–41
- "A Note on an Early Chimu Vessel in the Cleveland Museum of Art." The Bulletin of the Cleveland Museum of Art 10, no. 9 (1923): 158–71
- "The Origin of Tapestry Technique in Pre-Spanish Peru." Metropolitan Museum Studies 3, no. 1 (1930): 22–37
- "A Re-Examination of Prescott's Account of Early Peru." The New England Quarterly 4, no. 4 (1931): 645–62
- "Zelia Nuttall: An Appreciation." The Hispanic American Historical Review 13, no. 4 (1933): 487–89
- "Gonzalo Pizarro and Francisco de Orellana." The Hispanic American Historical Review 14, no. 3 (1934): 275–95
- "Ancient Peruvian Art on Loan at the Fogg Art Museum." Bulletin of the Fogg Art Museum 5, no. 3 (1936): 1–4
- "The Incas: Empire Builders of the Andes". The National Geographic Magazine, vol. LXXIII, no. 2 (February 1938)
- "Ancient American Papermaking." Isis 35, no. 1 (1944): 13–15.

=== Books for children ===
- Tupak of the Incas. New York: Charles Scribner's Sons, New York, 1942

=== Translations ===
- Account of the Conquest of Peru by Pedro Sancho. New York: Cortez Society, 1917
- Memorias Antiguas Historiales Del Peru. by Fernando Montesinos. Hakluyt Society series II, vol. XLVIII (48), 1921
- Relation of the Discovery and Conquest of the Kingdoms of Peru. by Pedro Pizarro. New York: Cortez Society, 1969.
