= Viracocha Inca =

Eighth Sapa Inca (emperor) of the Kingdom of Cusco

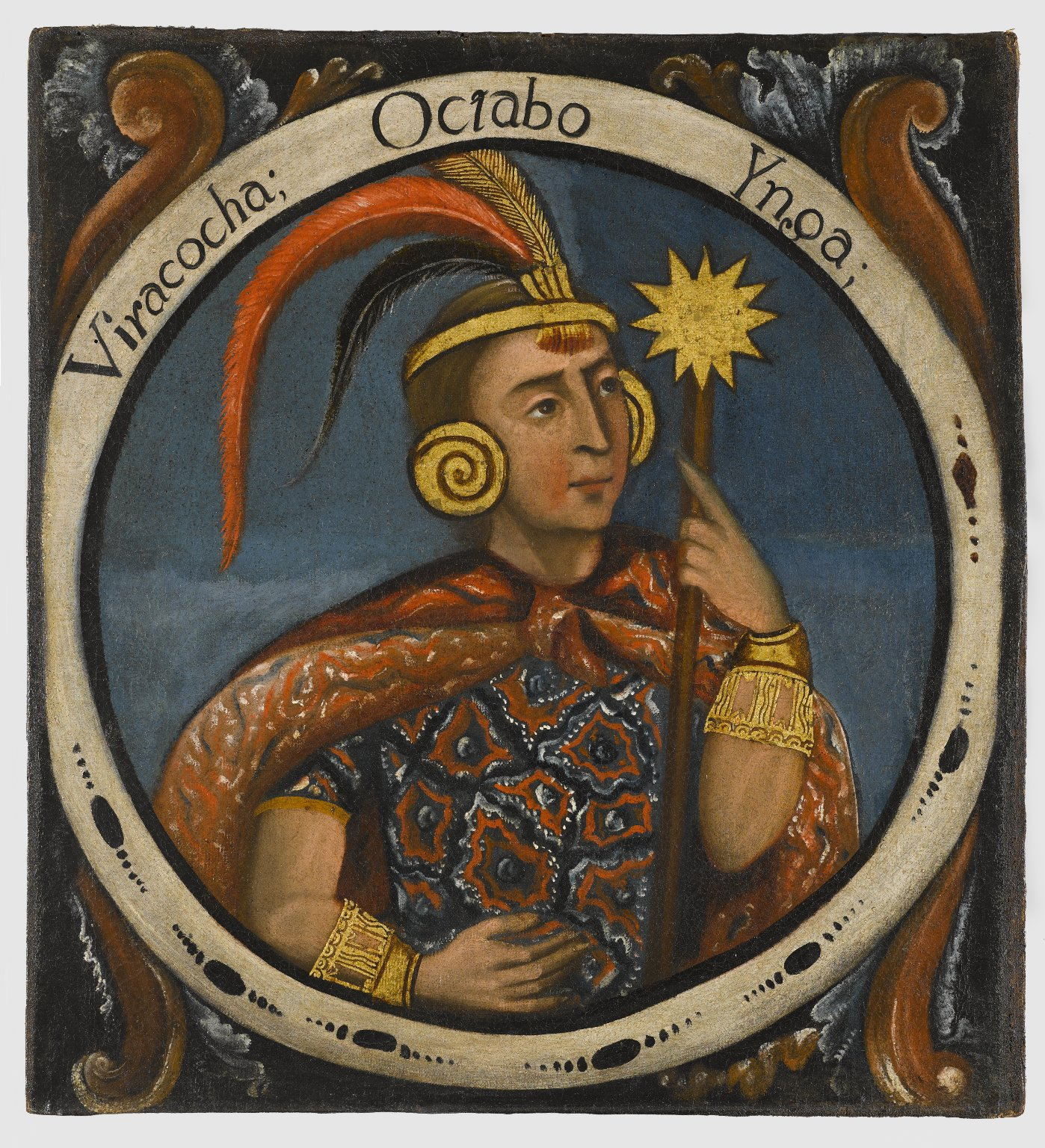

Sapa Inca of the Kingdom of Cusco
- Reign: c. 1410 – 1438
- Predecessor: Yawar Waqaq
- Successor: Pachacuti
- Born: Wiraqucha c. 1380; Cusco, Inca Empire
- Died: 1438 (aged 58)
- Consort: Mama Runtu
- Issue: Pachacuti
Names
- Hatun Tupaq or Ripaq
- Dynasty: Hanan Qusqu

Wiraqucha Inka (Quechua, the name of a god) or Viracocha (in hispanicized spelling) (c. 1410 – 1438) was the eighth Sapa Inka of the Kingdom of Cuzco (beginning around 1410) and the third of the Hanan dynasty.

== Biography ==
He was not the son of Yawar Waqaq; however, it was presented as such because he belonged to the same dynasty as his predecessor, the Hanan. His wife's name was Mama Runtu, and their sons included Inca Roca, Tupac Yupanqui, Pachacuti and Capac Yupanqui. His original name was Hatun Tupaq Inca, but he was named after creator deity Wiraqucha after seeing visions of the god in Urcos. With Curi chulpa, he had two additional sons, Inca Urco and Inca Socso.

Events in Wiraqucha's life have been recorded by several Spanish writers. The source closest to the original indigenous accounts comes from Juan de Betanzos, a Spanish commoner who rose to prominence by marrying an Inca princess and becoming the foremost translator for the colonial government of Cusco. Traditional oral histories of the Inca have been recorded by the Spanish Jesuit Bernabe Cobo. According to these accounts, including a widely recognized sixteenth century chronology written by Miguel Cabello Balboa, Wiraqucha was a "warlike" and "valiant" prince. As a young man, Wiraqucha declared that after he took the throne "he would conquer half the world".

However, in 1438 when, according to Cobo, the Chanka offensive took place, Wiraqucha was advised to leave Cusco before the Chanka attack. He left for Caquia Xaquixahuana, taking his illegitimate sons, Inca Urco and Inca Socso. However, his third son, Cusi Inca Yupanqui (later famous as the Emperor Pachakuti) refused to abandon Cusco and the House of the Sun. He remained with his brother Inca Rocca and six other chiefs, who together defeated the Chankas. The spoils were offered to Inca Wiraqucha to tread on, but he refused, stating Inca Urco should do so as his successor. Inca Rocca later killed his brother Urco, and Inca Wiraqucha died of grief in Caquia Xaquixahuana.

One chronicler, Sarmiento de Gamboa, states that Wiraqucha was the first Incan to rule the territories he conquered, while his predecessors merely raided and looted them. His captains, Apu Mayta and Vicaquirau, subdued the area within 8 leagues of Cusco.

== Bibliography ==
- Cobo, B. (1990) [1653]. Inca Religion and Customs. University of Texas Press.
- Betanzos, J. D. (1996) [1557]. Narrative of the Incas. Austin, TX: University of Texas Press.
- Mann, Charles (2006). 1491 - New Revelations of the Americas Before Columbus. Vintage Books. pp. 78–79. ISBN 978-1-4000-3205-1.

Regnal titles
Preceded by Yawar Waqaq	Sapa Inca c. 1410 – 1438	Succeeded by Pachacuti
