= Reiner Tom Zuidema =

Dutch-American anthropologist

Reiner Tom Zuidema (May 24, 1927 – March 2, 2016) was professor of Anthropology and Latin American and Caribbean Studies at University of Illinois at Urbana-Champaign. He is well known for his seminal contributions on Inca social and political organization. His early work consisted of a structural analysis of the ceque system. He later extended this approach, based on French and Dutch structuralism, to other aspects of Andean civilization, notably kinship, the Inca calendar and Incaic understanding of astronomy.

== Biography ==
Zuidema was born in Haarlem, the Netherlands. He obtained a PhD in his home country and later moved to the United States. He had started studying Indonesian social sciences but later switched to anthropology of South America. The main reason for this was that Indonesia became independent of the Netherlands, and he could not work in the country anymore. Zuidema studied Spanish in Madrid and moved to Peru in 1957. He published a study on the Ceque (lines) of Cusco in 1962. In 1964 Zuidema moved his family to Peru and started teaching at San Cristóbal of Huamanga University. After three years he returned to the United States and started working at the University of Illinois at Urbana-Champaign. In 1993 he retired.

In 1977 Zuidema became a correspondent of the Royal Netherlands Academy of Arts and Sciences. He was awarded an honorary doctorate by the Pontifical Catholic University of Peru in 1993.

== Publications (selection) ==
- 1964. The ceque system of Cuzco: the social organization of the capital of the Inca. Trans. Eva M. Hooykaas. Archives Internationales d’Ethnographie 50. Leiden: Brill.
- 1977. The Inca Calendar. In Native American Astronomy, 1:221-259. Austin: University of Texas Press.
- 1981. Inca Observations of the Solar and Lunar Passages Through Zenith and Anti- Zenith at Cuzco. In Archaeoastronomy in the Americas, ed. Ray A. Williamson, 319–342. Los Altos: Ballena Press.
- 1983. “Hierarchy and Space in Incaic Social Organization.” Ethnohistory 30 (2): 49–75.
- 1990. Inca Civilization in Cuzco. Trans. Jean-Jacques Decoster. Austin: University of Texas Press.
- 2011a. El Calendario Inca. Tiempo y Espacio en la Organizacion Ritual del Cuzco. La idea del pasado. Lima: Fondo Editorial del Congreso del Peru. pp. 906
- 2011b. "Chuquibamba Textiles and their Interacting Systems of Notation. In: Their Way of Writing. Scripts, Signs, and Pictographs in Pre-Columbian America. E. Boone and G. Urton, eds. Washington D.C.: Dumbarton Oaks, pp. 251-275.
- 2014a "Hacer calendarios" en Quipus y Tejidos. Los Numeros y su Rol en el Registro Simultaneo del Orden Sociopolitico y Calendarico Andino en El Cuzco, Chuquibamba y Collaguas. In: Sistemas de notacion Inca: Quipu y Tocapu. Actas del Simposio Internacional, Lima 15-17 de Enero de 2009. Carmen Arellano Hoffman, Editora. Peru, Ministerio de Cultura, Museo Nacional de Arqueologia, Antropologia e Historia del Peru. Proyecto QhapagNan, pp. 397–444
