= José Antonio del Busto Duthurburu =

Peruvian historian

- Born: August 21, 1932
- Died: December 25, 2006 (aged 74)
- Occupation: Historian

José Antonio del Busto Duthurburu (August 21, 1932 – December 25, 2006) was a Peruvian historian.

== Biography ==
He completed his studies at the Pontifical Catholic University of Peru. After completing his studies he devoted himself to teaching and research and documentation on the history of the conquest and the Viceroyalty of Peru. At 25 he received his PhD in history, before he had studied Education with a major in History and Geography.

Was secretary to Bishop Fidel Tubino, when he served as rector of the Pontifical Catholic University of Peru (PUCP ). His teaching began in 1953 in the Pre condition Instructor Seminar was led by Dr. Luis Jaime Cisneros. He also served as Dean of the Faculty of Arts and Humanities, and General Studies Letters PUCP. He was appointed Emeritus Professor of Humanities in 1995. He also taught at several universities and military institutions like the Naval Academy Army Aviation Military School of Chorrillos ( EMCH ), and, among other institutions of higher education.

In 1967 he traveled to Oceania following the alleged footprints of the traveler Tupac Yupanqui, who was considered and credited with being the discoverer of the continent.

Mayor was appointed chronicler of the First Peruvian Scientific Expedition to Antarctica in 1982.

He was President of the Institute for Humanities Research of the University of Piura, a member of the National Academy of History of the Peruvian Society of History, Institute of Historical Studies Maritimes, the Peruvian Institute of History of Law, an honorary member of the Peruvian Academy of the Quechua and Aymara languages, corresponding member of the Royal Spanish Academy of History, National Academy of Argentina, Academy of Sciences of Buenos Aires, a fellow of the Peruvian Institute of Genealogical Research and Commander of the Order Spanish by Alfonso X the Wise. In 1983, he held the leadership of the National Institute of Culture. In 1968 he won the National Prize of Culture Inca Garcilaso de la Vega. In 1979 he received the Peruvian Cross of Naval Merit and the 2002 Civic Medal Lima.

In November 2006 he was awarded the Order of the Sun of Peru.

He questioned the decision of the Municipality of Lima removal Monument Pizarro the side of the Plaza Mayor. "They can get him out of there, but never in history," he said, and few understood what was actually defending the origin of Peru at the junction between conquerors and conquered. "There are no winners or losers, we are descendants of the victors and the vanquished," said another time.

Finally, after years of painful illness and consumed by cancer, died on December 25, being their veiled in the headquarters of the Riva- Agüero Institute, where he began his academic work and came to be the director, school that was always bound residues .

== Works ==
- El Conde de Nieva, Virrey del Perú - 1963
- Francisco Pizarro, el Marqués Gobernador - 1966
- La tesis universitaria - 1966
- La casa de Peralta en el Perú - 1966
- La expedición de Hernando Pizarro a Pachacamac - 1967
- Perú pre-incaico - 1975
- Perú incaico - 1977
- Historia general del Perú: Descubrimiento y conquista - 1978
- La conquista del Perú - 1981
- La pacificación del Perú - 1984
- José Gabriel Túpac Amaru antes de su rebelión - 1981
- La Hueste Perulera: Selección de J.A. del Busto - 1981
- Francisco Pizarro y Trujillo de Extremadura - 1983
- Historia y leyenda del Viejo Barranco - 1985
- Diccionario histórico biográfico de los conquistadores del Perú - 1987
- Compendio de historia del Perú - 1983
- San Martín de Porras::(Martín de Porras Velásquez) - 1992
- Dos personajes de la conquista del Perú - 1969
- Antártida: Historia y futuro - 1991
- La tierra y la sangre de Francisco Pizarro - 1993
- Historia general del Perú - 1994
- Fundadores de ciudades en el Perú::(siglo XVI) - 1995
- Tres ensayos peruanistas - 1998
- Historia de la minería en el Perú - 1999
- Breve historia de los negros del Perú - 2001
- Pizarro - 2001
- Los hijos del Sol - 2005
- Túpac Yupanqui. Descubridor de Oceanía - 2006
