= John Howland Rowe =

American archaeologist & anthropologist (1918-2004)

- Born: June 10, 1918; Sorrento, Maine
- Died: May 1, 2004 (aged 85); Berkeley, California
- Education: Brown University; Harvard University
- Occupations: archaeologist, anthropologist

John Howland Rowe (June 10, 1918 – May 1, 2004) was an American archaeologist and anthropologist known for his extensive research on Peru, especially on the Inca civilization.

Rowe studied classical archaeology at Brown University (1935–1939) and anthropology at Harvard University (1939–1941). After graduating he traveled to Peru where he undertook archaeological research and taught until 1943. Between 1944 and 1946 he served as sergeant in the U.S. Combat Engineers in Europe. From 1946 to 1948 he studied the Guambía people in Colombia for the Smithsonian Institution, returning briefly to Harvard in 1946 to complete his doctorate in Latin American history and anthropology in 1947. In 1948 he started teaching at the University of California, Berkeley where he remained active until 1988. A prolific writer, Rowe authored more than 300 publications in English and Spanish between 1940 and 2005. He became a lifelong friend of the Andean explorers Vince Lee and his wife Nancy. He mentored Lee, inviting him into his Institute of Andean Studies while offering continuous encouragement for both to continue with their explorations in Vilcabamba and elsewhere in Peru.
