= Sempé =

Sempé is a French surname. Notable people with the surname include:

- Carlota Sempé (born 1942), Argentine archaeologist
- Gabriel Sempé (1901–1990), French athlete
- Inga Sempé (born 1968), French designer and constructor of technical items
- Jean-Jacques Sempé (1932–2022), French cartoonist
- Skip Sempé (born 1958), American harpsichordist and conductor

== Places ==
- Sempe, Lesotho
