= Andean world =

Cultural area of South America

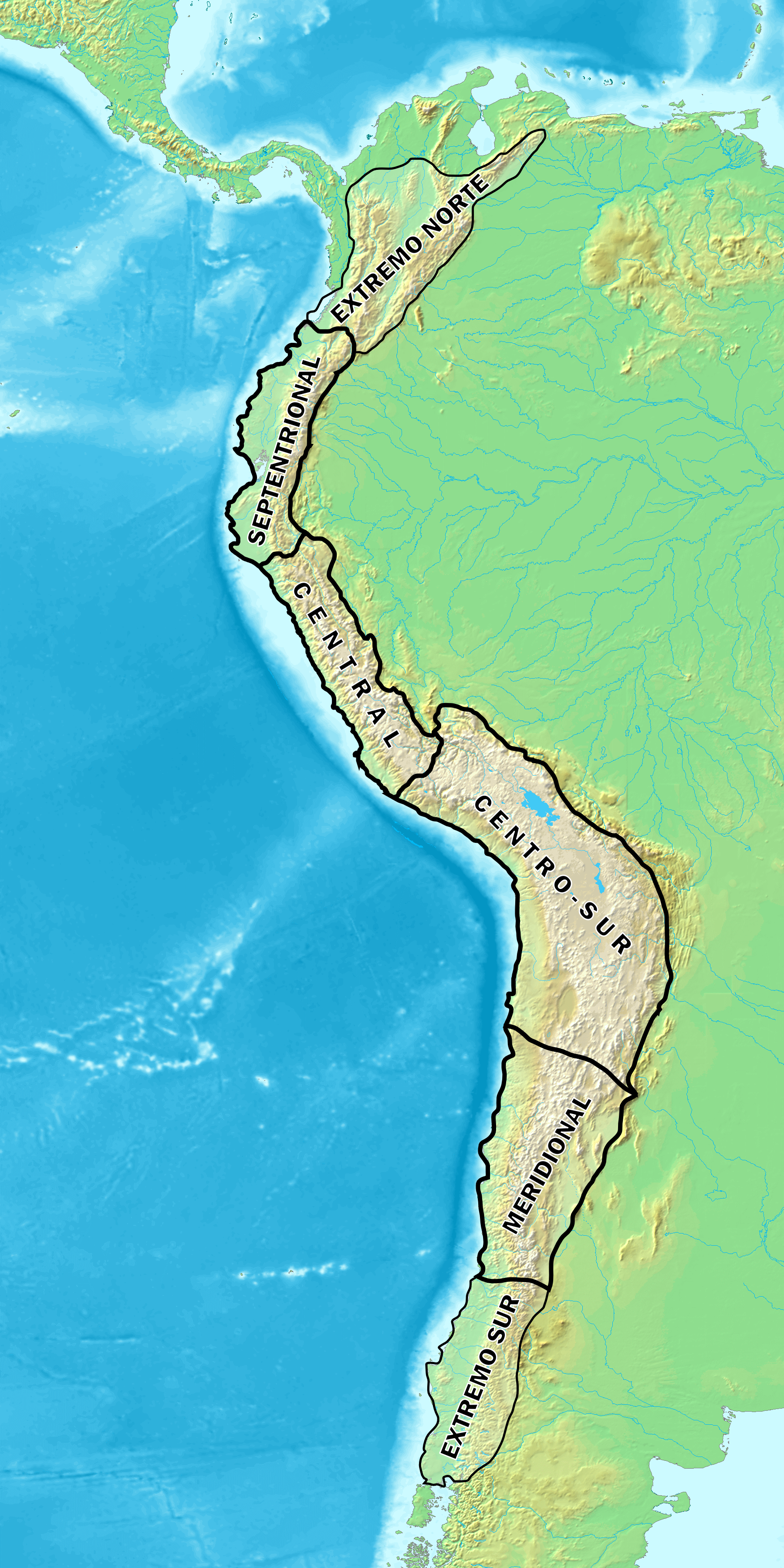
Cultural areas of the Andes.

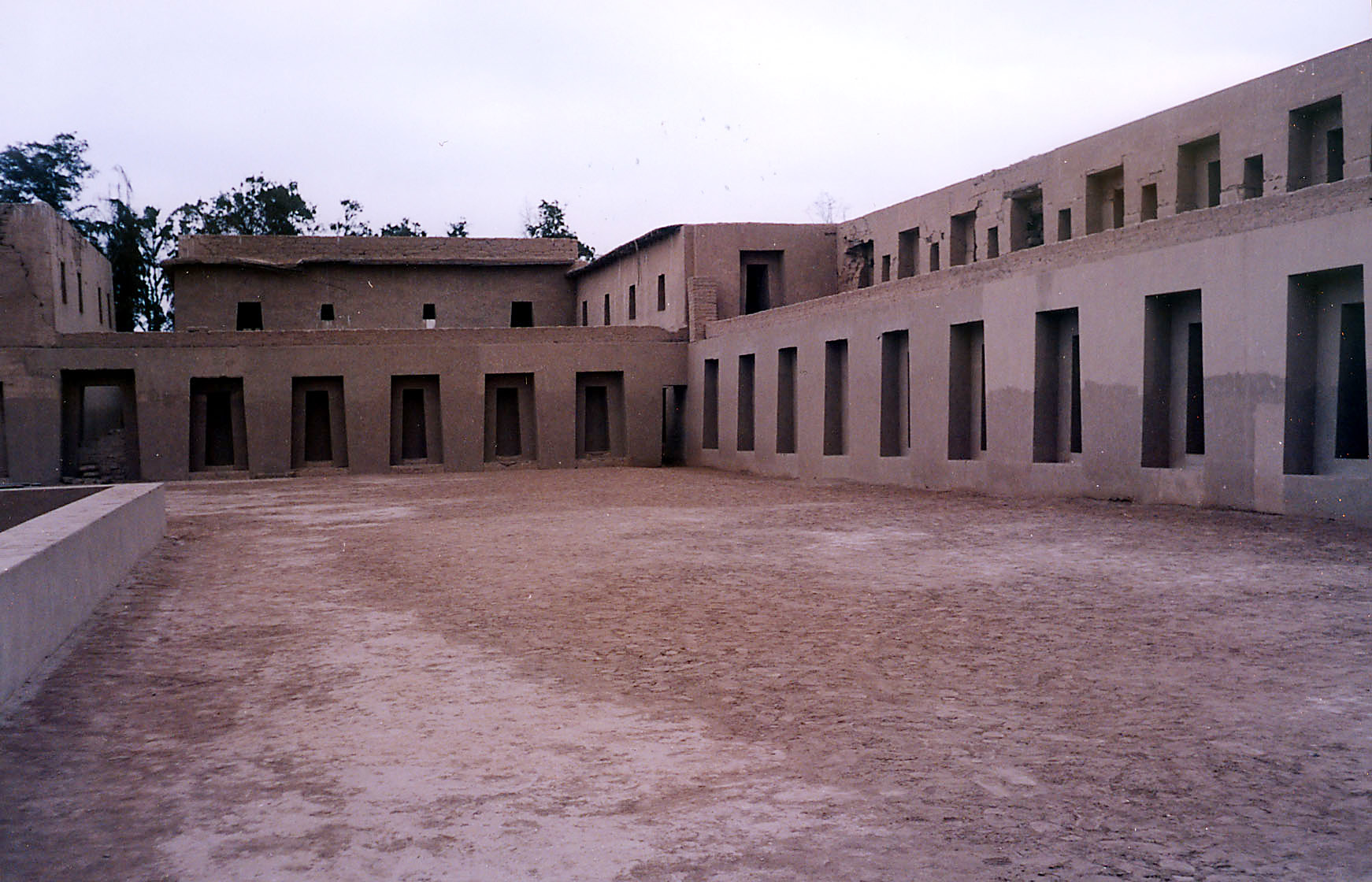
Acllahuasi in Pachacamac. It was built during the Inca Empire to house the acllas and mamacunas.

The Andean world (Spanish: mundo andino), Andean cultural area (Spanish: área cultural andina) or Andean America (Spanish: andinoamérica) is a cultural area in existence since pre-Columbian times located in the central region of the Andes mountain range, where the most complex societies of South America developed, the Andean civilizations. Its approximate extent goes from the center-south of Chile and Mendoza in Argentina, north up to the south of Colombia. To the north, it overlaps in part with what is known as the Intermediate Area.

The concept of the Andean area was discussed in the mid-20th century. Bennett and Bird established an area of co-tradition in the Andean region primarily focused on the Central Andes and the existence of an "Intermediate" area located north of the Cajamarca basin in Peru. This approach, valid for Peruvian archaeology, does not encompass all the complex societies that emerged in the Andes before the Spanish conquest. In this regard, the macro-Andean approach postulated by Luis Lumbreras in 1981 emerged, which established what is now known as the Andean cultural area. This cultural area is the consequence of an interdependence relationship caused by an agricultural-based lifestyle; therefore, it is not applicable to pre-agricultural stages nor will it be for social levels based, for example, on industry. A factor that unites all the peoples of this area, according to Lumbreras, is that their relationship with the environment is resolved through a constant cycle of sea - mountain range - tropical forest, which shapes an integrative economic rationality transverse to the geographic axis of the Andes.

However, there are differences and varying degrees of complexity in the social and political development of the cultures within the Andean area, expressed in sub-areas.

Politically, most of the Andean world was unified under the Inca and the Spanish empires both of which engaged in policies of colonization and population transfers. These empires left linguistic legacies in terms of the dispersal of Imperial Quechua and Spanish languages in the Andean world.

== Subareas ==
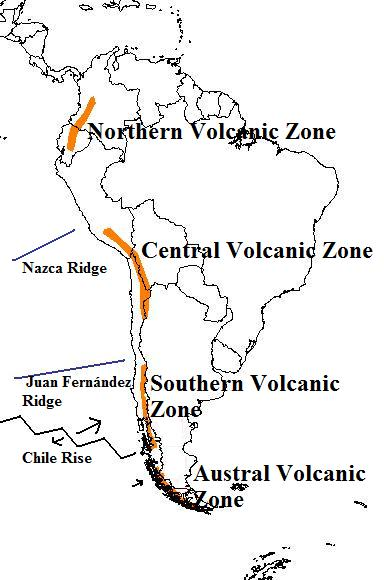
Volcanic zones of the Andes where pre-Hispanic cultures developed. In the north, the ethnic lordships of Ecuador, in the center the Aymara kingdoms and the Incas, and in the south the pre-Hispanic cultures of Chile. This also includes the eastern Andes where the Muiscas developed and the western Andes where the Quimbayas were located.

The boundaries of these cultural subareas do not coincide with the borders of modern Andean republics.

Northern extreme
Includes the Andean basins of the Magdalena and Cauca (Colombia), the Altiplano Cundiboyacense, the Colombian coast, and part of western Venezuela. Regional Colombian cultures developed here, including the Quimbaya, Tairona, San Agustín, Tierra Adentro, and Chibcha. This subarea is where ceramics may have been invented in South America. The ecosystem of páramo predominates.

Northern Andean area
Primarily composed of Ecuadorian territory, the southwestern corner of Colombia, and the northernmost part of Peru. Known cultures include the ancient Valdivia culture, with one of the oldest ceramics in the Americas (3600 BCE), and the Mayo-Chinchipe culture. The Manteña-huancavilca civilization and the Milagro culture in the coastal regions, and the late kingdoms of Caranqui-Cayambe and Cañar are also part of this subarea. The development of the Vicus culture, however, is deeply connected to the next subarea.

Central Andean area
Located in Peru (although its influence is strongly felt in the northern and central-southern Andes). The high Andean regions are dominated by the puna ecosystem, and the coast is arid. It is considered along with the central-southern area as the most culturally developed region. It includes a vast history where cultures such as Caral-Supe, Chavín, Moche, Nazca, Recuay, Wari, Chimú, Chachapoya, and Inca, among many others, stand out.

Central-southern Andean area (Titicaca Circum area)
Includes the southernmost part of Peru, Bolivia, northern Chile, and part of northeastern Argentina. Its high Andean zone is dominated by the Collao Plateau. The coastal region is the driest in South America. It is home to the Chinchorro culture, Pucará, the Atacama cultures, Tiwanaku, and the Aymara kingdoms.

Southern Andean area
Occupies central Chile and much of the Argentine Northwest.

Southern extreme
Occupies what has traditionally been identified as the Araucanía.

== Culture ==
Andean culture is a collective term used to refer to the indigenous peoples of the Andes mountains especially those that came under the influence of the Inca Empire. Cultures considered Andean include:

- Atacama people
- Aymara people
- Muisca people or Chibcha
- Andean civilizations
- Quechua people
- Uru people
- Diaguita people
- Maina people
- Mayo-Chinchipe

This term is also used to describe the Hispanic based cultures of the Andes, which through the interaction of the Spaniards with the Andean Natives formed into a distinct group of cultures incorporating both Hispanic and Indigenous cultural traits, although such a definition excludes the contribution of other human groups and ethnicities inhabiting in the Andean mountains, such as non Andean indigenous groups, African diaspora in the Americas or Asian immigrants. These cultures include:

- Culture of Bolivia
- Culture of Chile
- Colombian culture
- Culture of Ecuador
- Argentine Northwest
- Culture of Peru

== Gallery ==
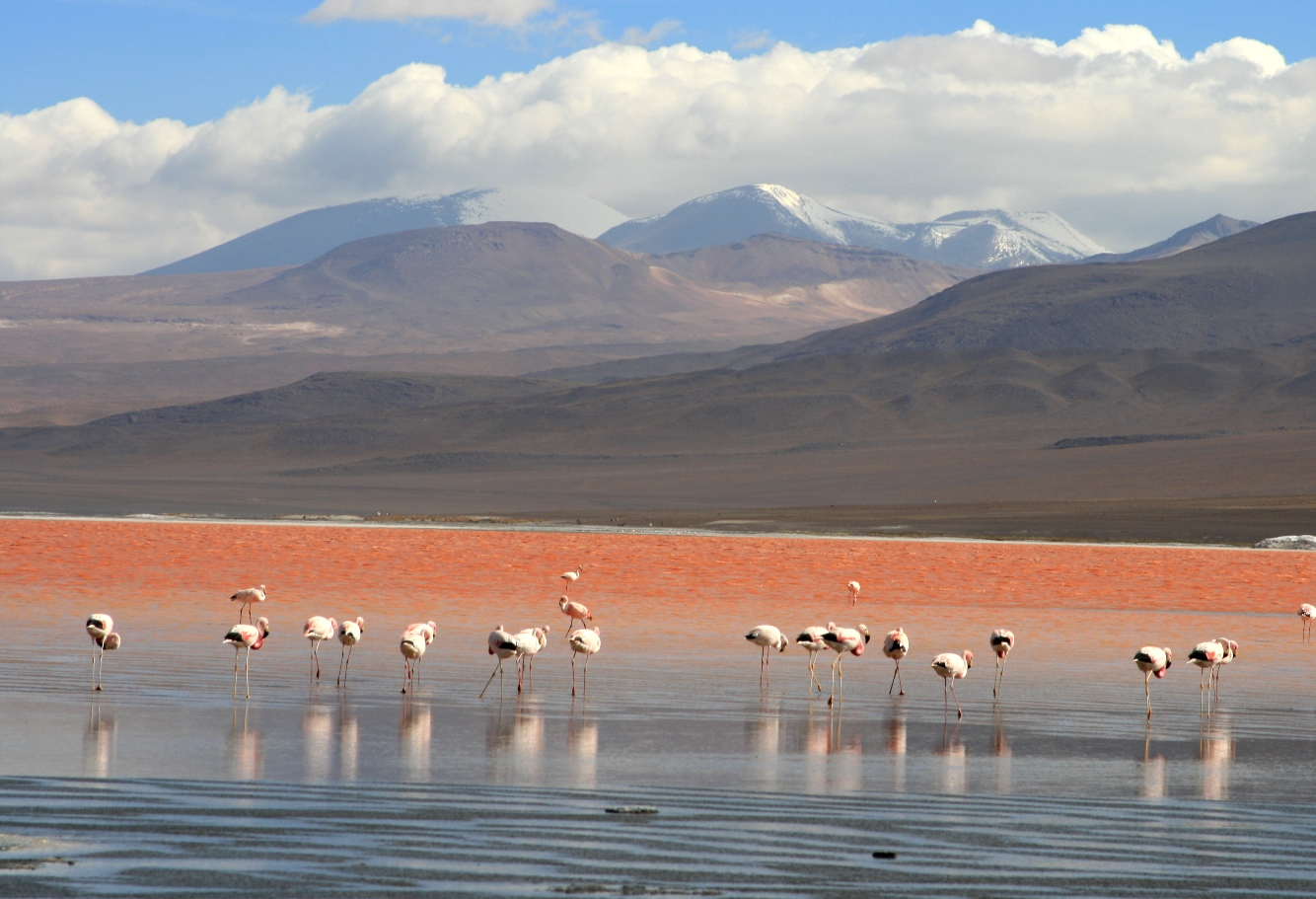
Laguna Colorada

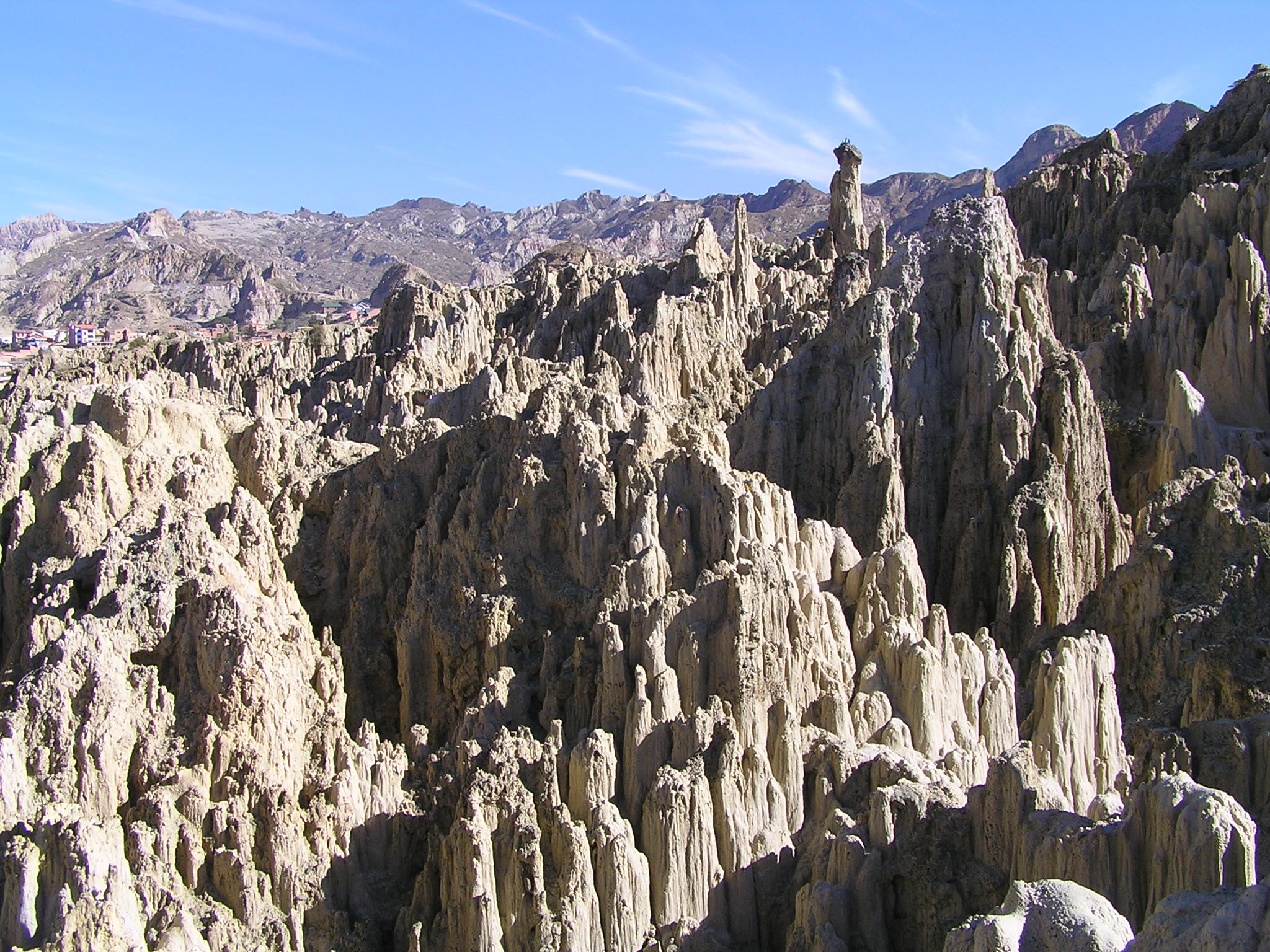
Rock formations in the Valley of the Moon

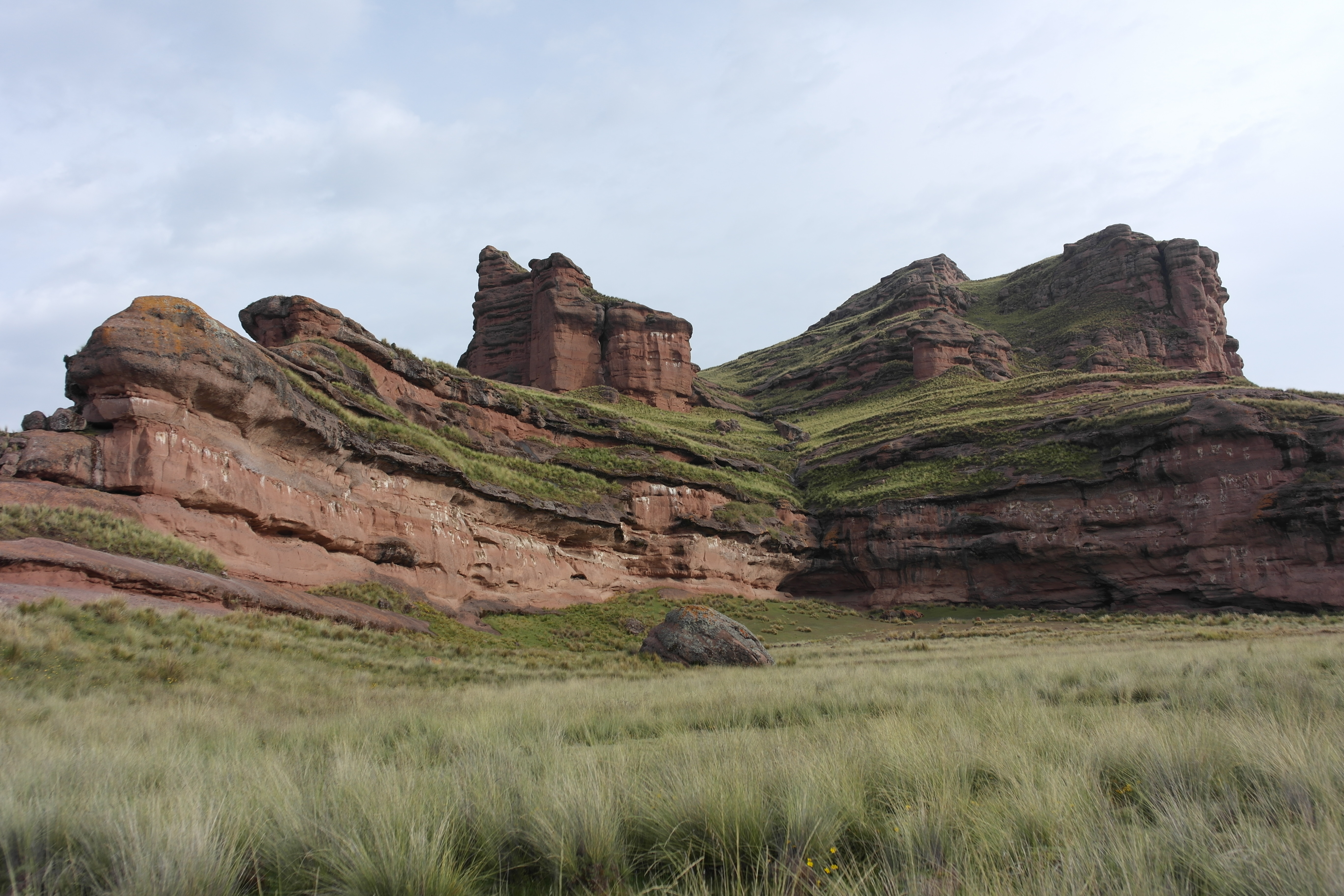
Tinajani Canyon

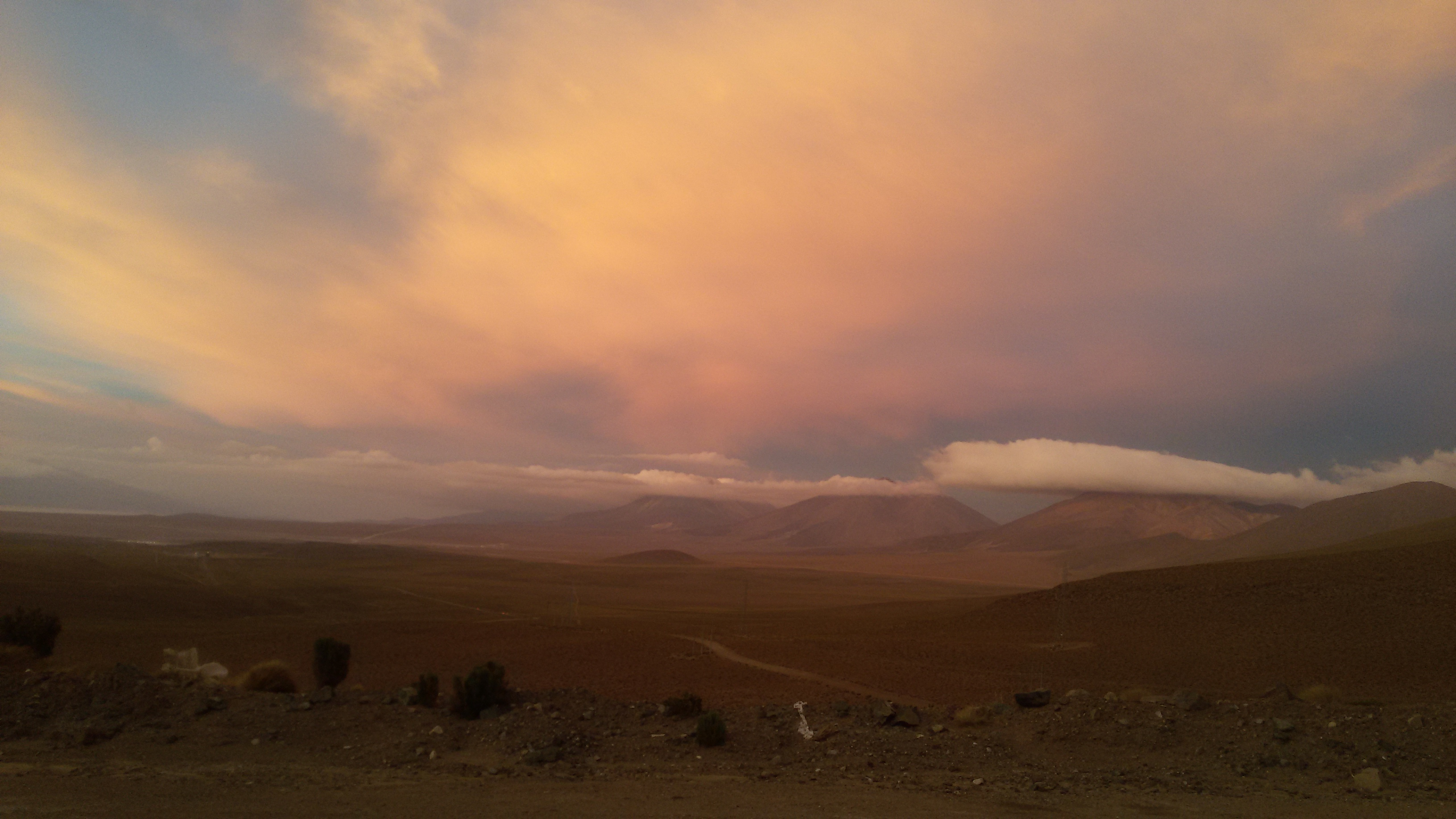
Puna Altiplano

== See also ==
- Inca Empire
- Latin American social archaeology
- Primer Congreso del Hombre Andino
- Viceroyalty of Peru

== Bibliography ==
- Lumbreras, Luis (1981). Arqueología de la América Latina. Lima: Milla Batres.
- Alcina, José. La tradición cultural andina, en: Los incas y el Antiguo Perú. Madrid: Sociedad Estatal Quinto Centenario, 1991..
