= Ana María Lorandi =

Argentine archaeologist (1936–2017)

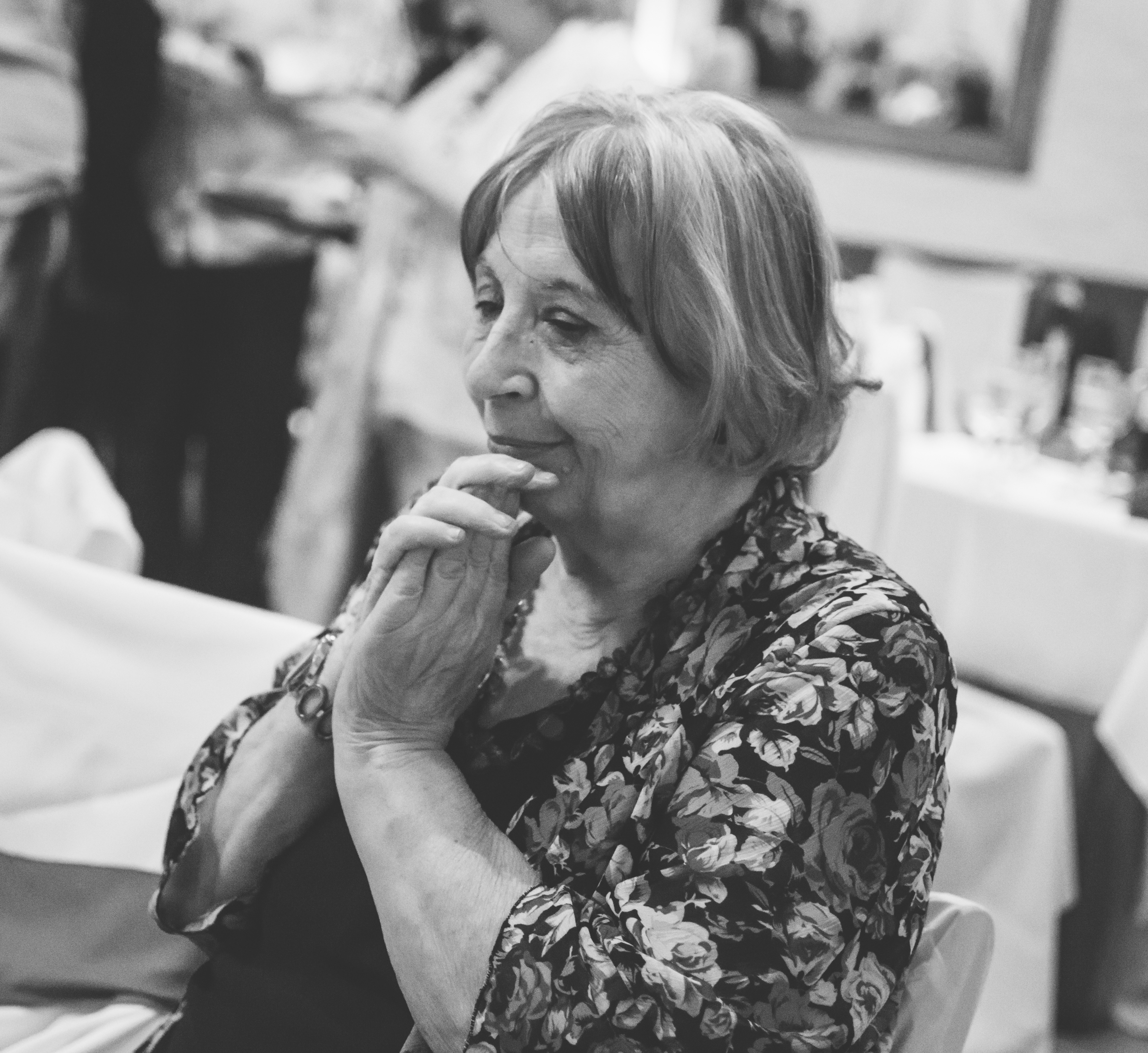
- Ana María Lorand in 2016
- Born: Ana María Lorandi; 7 March 1936; Cañada de Gómez, Santa Fe Province, Argentina
- Died: 30 January 2017 (aged 80); Buenos Aires, Argentina
- Education: National University of Rosario
- Occupations: Archeologist, historian
- Employer: National Scientific and Technical Research Council

Ana María Lorandi (7 March 1936 – 30 January 2017) was an Argentine archaeologist, historian and scientific researcher who specialised in Andean ethnohistory. Along John Victor Murra she is known for a new radical historiography of the Inca Empire. Besides her Andean studies she also contributed to research on the rural areas of southeastern of South America, that is Paraguay, the Argentine Littoral, the Pampas and Patagonia.

In June 1973 Lorandi participated in the Primer Congreso del Hombre Andino held in northern Chile.
