= Laia (tool) =

Two-pronged type of foot-plough

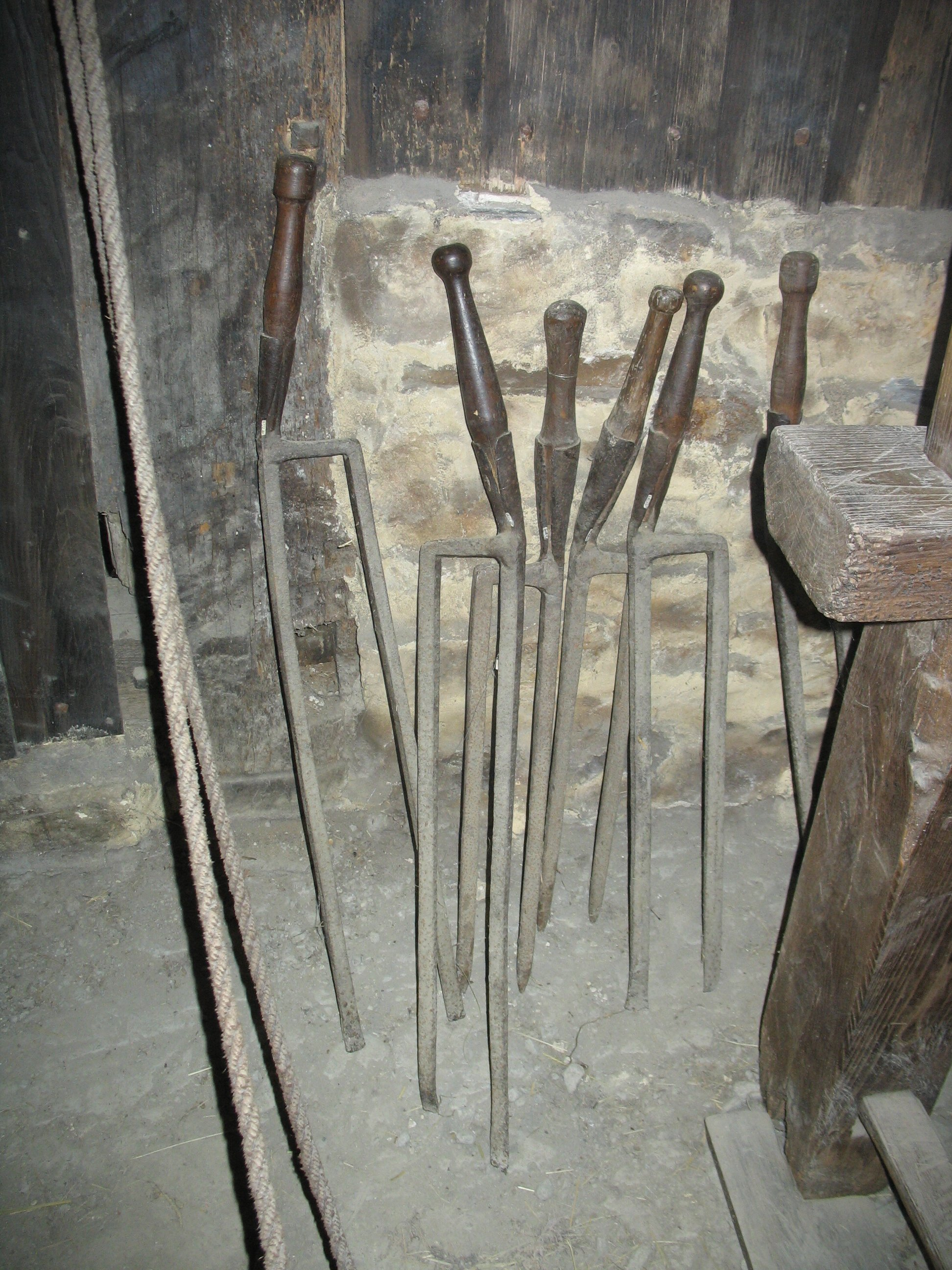
Laias at the Igartubeiti Museum

The laia (Spanish: laya) is a two-pronged type of foot-plough used in the Basque Country. Aside from being a farming implement, it is also used in laia racing. The people using a laia are referred to as laiariak in Basque.

== Etymology ==
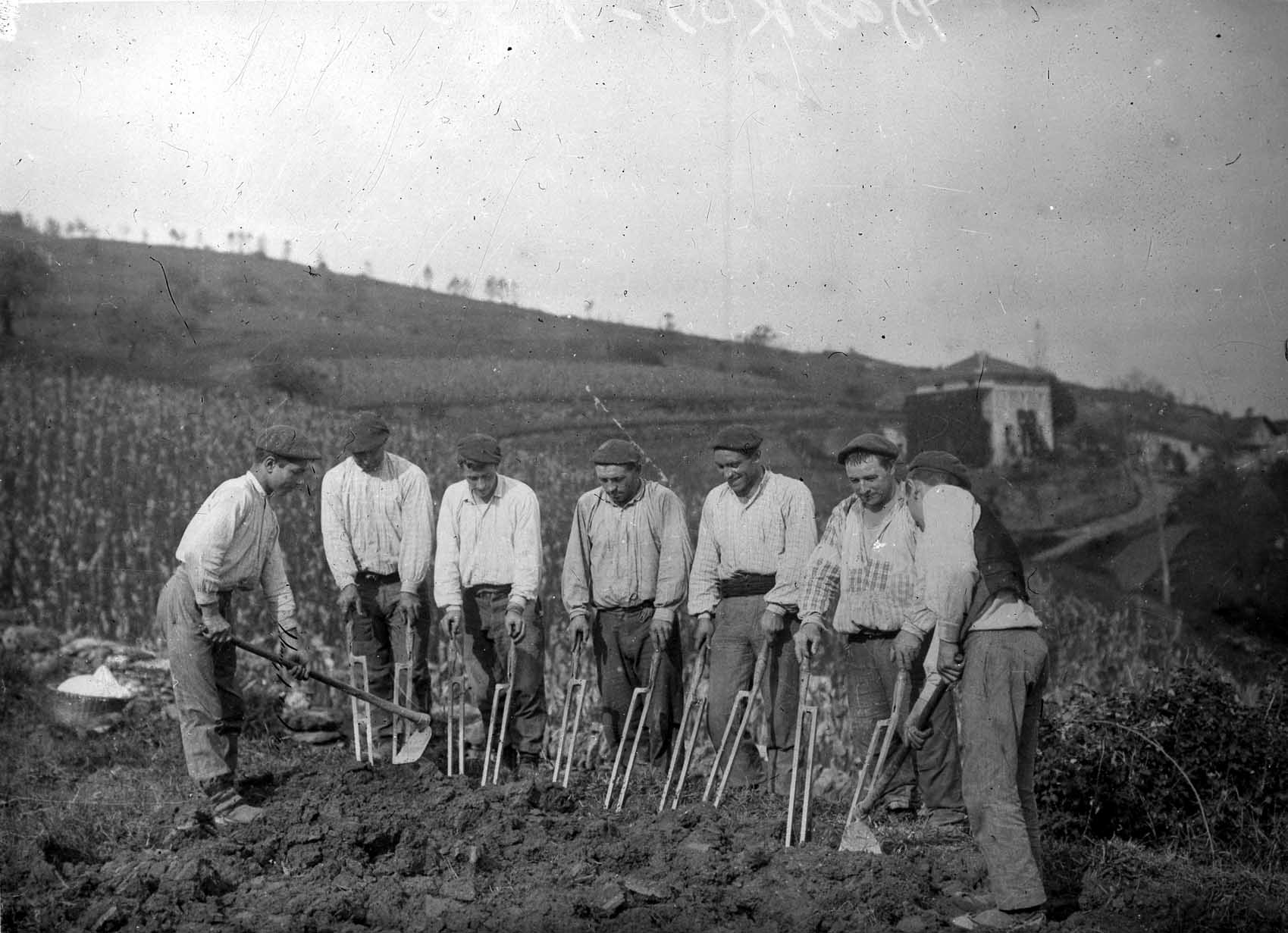
Laiariak in the Hernani region

The word is also attested as lai, without the absolutive ending but is mainly used in the form of laia today. Other forms include lain (Oiartzun) and laixa (Eibar). Beyond that the etymology is not entirely clear, but a connection with names for other forked implements in other neighbouring Romance languages such as the Béarnese word layà (a forked instrument for gathering chestnuts) seems plausible.

== See also ==
- Foot plough
- Loy
