= Latin American social archaeology =

Marxist school of thought in archaeology

Latin American social archaeology (LASA) is a school of thought developed in Latin America in the 1970s and 1980s, focusing on the application of historical materialism to the interpretation of the archaeological record. It is an orthodox current of Marxism, since it adheres to dialectical materialism.

Within Latin American social archaeology, there are two main currents. The first was initiated by the Peruvian archaeologist Luis G. Lumbreras and draws most of his inspiration from the work of Vere Gordon Childe, and authored the seminal book La Arqueología como Ciencia Social (1984). Most of his papers, and those of his followers, appeared in the journal 'Gaceta Arqueológica Andina', a South American archaeological journal that ran throughout the 1990s. Lumbreras was recognized for creating a new perspective on archaeology with valuable contributions, not only in the descriptive and analytical aspect, but also in the theoretical plane of the definition of Peruvian archeology. He is one of the founders of Latin America social archaeology for his contributions to data collection and participation in the development and integration of society.

The other main current, inspired by the work of Lumbreras, is composed of those archaeologists who are members of the Oaxtepec Group, among them: Luis F. Bate (Chile), I. Vargas Arenas (Venezuela), Mario Sanoja Obediente (Venezuela), Marcio Veloz Maggiolo (Dominican Republic). Most of their works were published by the journal 'Boletín de Antropología Americana, published by the Instituto Panaméricano de Geografía. The whole production of this group on Marxist theory and archaeology was synthesized by Luis F. Bate, in his book El proceso de Investigación en Arqueología (1998).

== Archaeology as a social science ==
In 1976, Luis G. Lumbreras published a compilation of some papers on Peruvian archaeology plus five capitules dedicated to Marxist Theory, and its potential for archaeological research. The work was heavily influenced by Childe (1954), especially by its unilineal conception of cultural evolution (Childe 1964). After that work, Lumbreras published a lot of papers in the Gaceta Arqueológica Andina. Most of them republished in the book Arqueología y Sociedad.

== The tri-categorial system ==
The most interesting contribution of the Oaxtepec archaeologist is the system the proposed to understand "social wholes or totalities". To the classical distinction between Infrastructure and Superstructure, they added the distinction between Form and Content (Bate 1998).

They propose that society has three levels of existence: Culture, the Mode of Life and the Socio-economical Formation (SEF). The last is the system of essential contents of the society, i.e. the dialectical link between the forces of production, the relations of productions and some general form of ideology and institutions. The SEF is common to all societies with the same level of development. Culture is the phenomenological singular manifestation of a single society.

The Mode of Life is an intermediate category thar refers to particularities of the mode of production, determined by ecological variables. For example, for the Foraging or Hunter-gatherer mode of production, you can define various modes of life according to the classical Forager-Collector dichotomy.

Also, the three levels have distinctive temporal rhythms. The SEF is the slower of the three, since many changes in the Mode of Life or in Culture could happen before a revolutionary evolution of the mode of production occurs.

The tri-categorial system is a kind of answer to the debates about sociocultural-unilinear social evolutionism vs. multilineal evolutionism.

== Criticism ==
In their comments to "Social Archaeology in Latin America: An Appreciation", archaeologists Augusto Oyuela-Caycedo, Armando Anaya, and Carlos G. Elera commemorate Patterson for his contribution to Latin American Social Archaeology and bringing that information to an arena of English speakers as an aspect of the development of archaeology as a discipline that has previously been ignored. However, they criticize his article for exaggerating the importance of a phenomenon that was very limited in its timeframe.

Social archaeology in Latin America was a direct consequence of political changes in the governments of Chile, Peru, and Venezuela. Between the late 1960s and early 1980s, there was a spike in appreciation for Marxist ideology. A tolerance for alternative state models can be seen with the support of socialist administrations during this time, such as Chilean socialist Salvador Allende, but this period ended with a rapid move from left to right-wing ideologies and the exile of archaeologists and intellectuals from social positions. The Latin American social archaeologists to come out of this era (Bate, Lumbreras, Vargas, and Sanoja) can be considered part of an activist generation that was heavily involved with, or influenced by, Marxist political ideology. This activism was understood as part of a "revolutionary political compromise". Prevalent too during this period of upheaval and social movements was a disdain towards the United States and other imperialist countries for their involvement in Latin American archaeology, coining the term "Archaeology of Protest" for social archaeology.

== See also ==
- Primer Congreso del Hombre Andino
- Social history

== Bibliography ==
- Bate, L.F. 1998. El proceso de investigación en Arqueología. Ediciones Crítica, Barcelona.
- Childe, V.G. 1954. Los Origenes de la Civilización. Fondo de Cultura Económica, México. (Man Makes Himself)
- Childe, V.G. 1964. Evolución Social.
- Lumbreras, L.G. 1984 (1976). La Arqueología como ciencia social. Casa de las Américas, La Habana, Cuba.
- Lumbreras, L.G. 2005. Arqueología y Sociedad. Instituto de Estudios Peruanos, Lima.
- McGuire, R. (1993). "Archaeology and Marxism". Archaeological Method and Theory. 5: 101–158. JSTOR 20170230.
- Vargas Arenas, I. 1985. "Modo de vida: categoría de las mediaciones entre formación social y cultura". In Boletín de antropología americana 12.
- Vargas Arenas, I. 1986. "Sociedad y naturaleza: en torno a las mediaciones y determinaciones para el cambio en las FES preclasistas". In Boletín de antropología americana 13:65-74.
- Vargas Arenas, I. 1987. "La formación económico social tribal". In Boletín de antropología americana 15:15-26.
- Vargas Arenas, I. 1989. "Teorías sobre el cacicazgo como modo de vida: el caso del Caribe". In Boletín de antropología americana 20: 19-30
- Veloz Maggiolo, M. 1984. "La arqueología de la vida cotidiana: matices, historia y diferencias". In Boletín de Antropología Americana 10: 5-21.
