= Andean region =

Andean region may refer to:

- Andes, mountain chain in South America
- Andean Region (Venezuela)
- Andean Region, Colombia
- Andean world, the cultural area associated with the Andes mountains
