= Vertical archipelago =

Description of the native Andean agricultural economy

The vertical archipelago is a term coined by sociologist and anthropologist John Victor Murra under the influence of economist Karl Polanyi to describe the native Andean agricultural economic model of accessing and distributing resources. While some cultures developed market economies, the predominant models were systems of barter and shared labor. These reached their greatest development under the Inca Empire. Scholars have identified four distinct ecozones, at different elevations.

== Overview ==
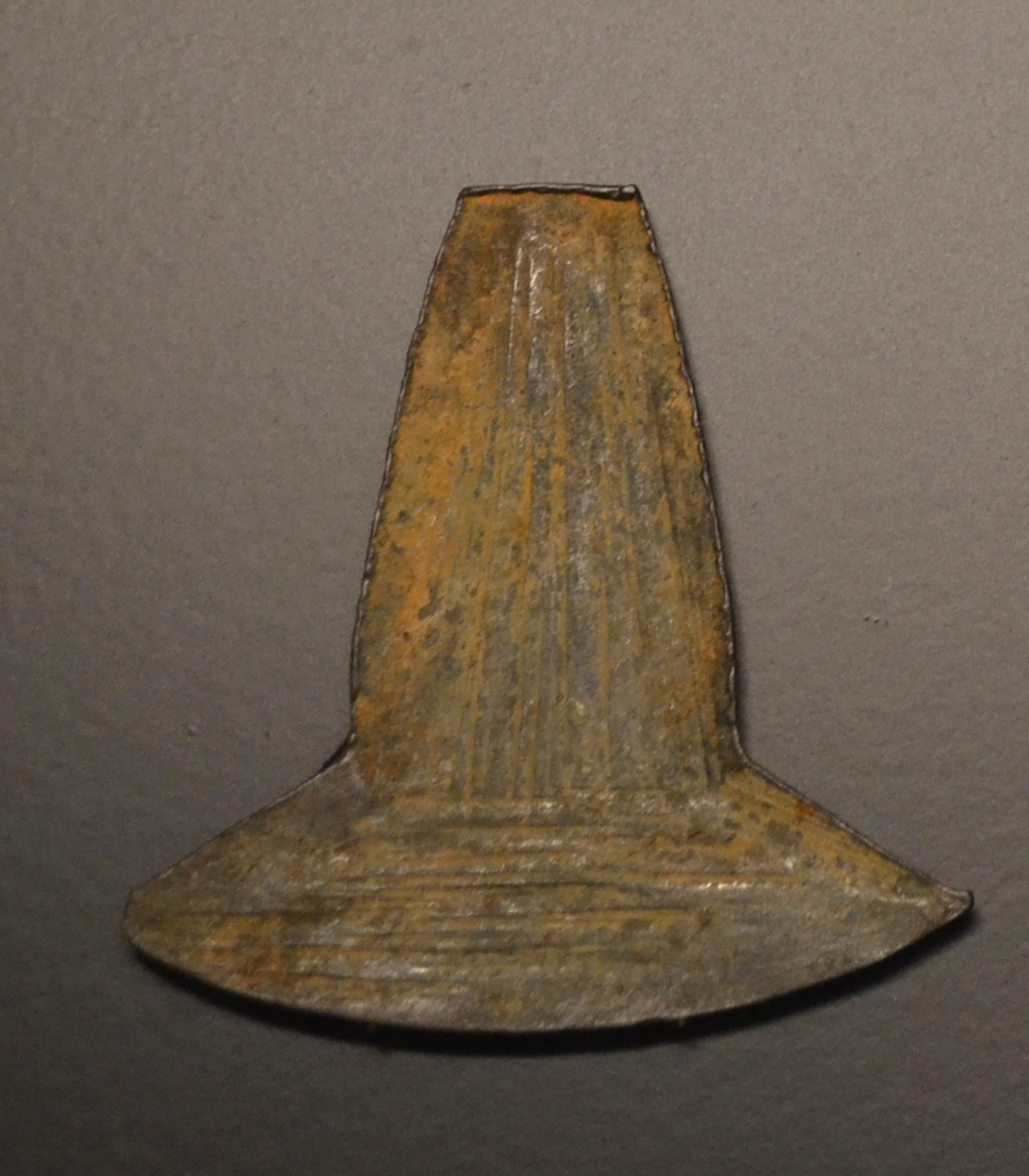
Axe-monies from Ecuador (10th-14th century).

Aside from certain cultures, particularly in the arid northwest coast of Peru and northern Andes, pre-colonial Andean civilizations did not have strong traditions of market-based trade. Like Mesoamerican pochteca traders, there was a trading class known as mindaláes in these northern coastal and highland societies. A system of barter known as trueque is also known to have existed in these coastal societies as a means of exchanging goods and food stuffs between farmers and fishermen. A simple currency, known to archaeologists as axe-monies, were also present in the area (as well as western Mesoamerica). By contrast, most highland Andean societies, such as the Quechua and Aymara, were organized into moietal lineage groups, such as ayllus in the Quechua case. These lineages internally shared local labor through a system called mink'a. The mink'a labor system itself rested upon the concept of ayni, or reciprocity, and did not use any form of money as in the case of the coastal Andean traders. All members of the village, the Ayllu, had to contribute a certain amount of labor (usually one day a week) to a communal project such as the construction of common use buildings, maintenance, herding the communally owned animals or sowing and harvesting communally owned farmland. Fundamentally, it is a concept of "ecological complementarity" mediated through cultural institutions. Some scholars, while accepting the structure and basic nature of the vertical archipelago, have suggested that inter-ethnic trade and barter may have been more important than the model suggests, despite the lack of evidence in the archaeological and ethnohistoric record.

Absent the use of trade to access resources, economic transactions were essentially intra-lineage obligations of labor. These lineages required a base level of self-sufficiency to achieve autarky. In the Andes, a long mountain range with a great variety of ecozones and resources, the need to access the proper lands for specific crops or animals meant lineages created miniature colonies or sent seasonal migration (such as transhumance) in different ecoregions. As the Andes are a relatively young mountain range, there is especially great variation in rainfall and temperature, which has great importance for agriculture. This is all the more important as only about 2% of the land in the Andes is arable.

== Ecozones ==
Headed from the arid, western coast to the humid, eastern slopes bordering the Amazon basin, there are four basic ecozones which highland Andean communities exploit:

- The quechua zone refers to relatively warm, relatively low valleys falling between 2,300 and 3,200 m (7,500 and 10,500 ft). This area shares its name with the Quechua people and languages and was especially sought after for growing maize.
- The suni zone rises from 3,200 to 4,000 m (10,500 to 13,100 ft) and is suitable for the production of native tubers and grains such as quinoa, kaniwa, and kiwicha. Given the innumerable valleys and micro-climates of the Andes, over the millennia Andean farmers developed over 1,000 varieties of potatoes, as well as other tuber species, such as mashua, ulluco, oca, and achira.
- The puna zone is composed of high, cold grasslands, suitable largely for pasture by camelids, the domesticated llama and alpaca, as well as the wild vicuña and guanaco. The former were used not only as pack animals, but also for their meat and wool. Vicuñas and guanacos, though undomesticated, were used for their fine and much-prized wool. Little agriculture is practiced in the puna, though in the Bolivian altiplano intensive agriculture was possible through the use of waru waru raised bed agriculture, which used specialized irrigation techniques to prevent frost from destroying crops.
- The montaña zone is humid and forested. Populations here were not as large as in other ecozones, as the plants grown in montaña areas were generally speaking not food crops, but rather tobacco and coca. Just as the puna is used to collect resources from wild animals as well as domestic ones, brightly colored feathers were collected from wild birds in the montaña, such as macaws.

== Under the Inca ==
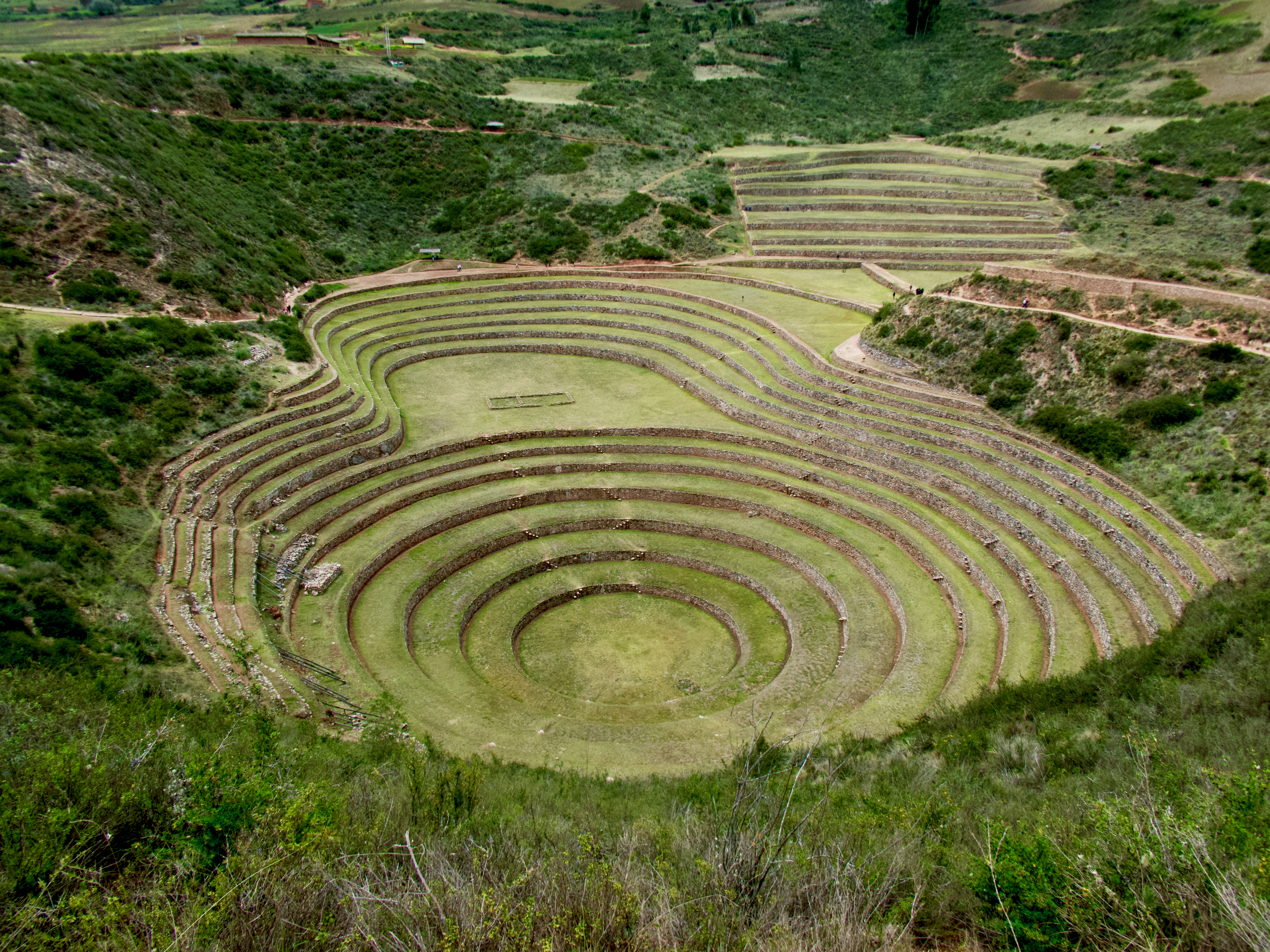
The terraces of Moray.

The Inca state drew its taxes through both tax in kind and corvée labor drawn from lineages and administered through a bureaucracy composed largely of local nobility. The corvée labor force was used for military operations as well as public works projects, such as roads, aqueducts, and storage buildings known as tampu and qollqa. There were parallel institutions of lineage-based colonies known as mitmaqkuna, which produced goods for the state and provided strategic security in newly acquired areas, and yanakuna, which were retainers with labor obligations to higher members of the state. Lands belonging to the Sapa Inca, the state church, and to panaqas (lineages descending from individual Sapa Incas according to the principle of split inheritance) were often vertically arrayed to access a variety of resources. Indeed, it has been widely suggested that the terraces at Moray were testing grounds for determining which crops would grow under what conditions in order to more efficiently exploit ecozones. The terraces were apparently constructed so that different temperatures and humidities could be achieved through the creation of microclimates, and therefore produce different kinds of crops.

== See also ==
- Incan agriculture
- Karl Polanyi
- Primer Congreso del Hombre Andino
- Substantivism
