= Declan Hughes (writer) =

Irish novelist, playwright, and screenwriter

Declan Hughes (born 1963) is an Irish novelist, playwright and screenwriter. He has been Writer-in-Association with the Abbey Theatre in Dublin and Irish Writer Fellow at Trinity College, Dublin. He has written a series of crime novels featuring the Irish American detective Ed Loy. The name "Loy" is a homage to the character Sam Spade from The Maltese Falcon: a loy is a traditional Irish spade.

His most recent novel is All the Things You Are (2014), which follows City of Lost Girls (2010), All the Dead Voices (2009), The Price of Blood (2008), The Dying Breed, The Color of Blood (2007) and The Wrong Kind of Blood (2006).

His plays include Shiver (2003), Digging for Fire and New Morning.

Hughes lives in Dublin with his wife and two daughters.

== Bibliography ==
=== Novels ===
- The Wrong Kind of Blood (2006) – ISBN 9780060825461
- The Colour of Blood (2007) – ISBN 9780060825492
- Dying Breed (2008) – ISBN 9780060825515
- All the Dead Voices (2009) – ISBN 9780061689888
- City of Lost Girls (2010) – ISBN 9780061689901
- All the Things You Are (2014)

=== Plays ===
- I Can't Get Started (1990)
- Digging for Fire (1991)
- New Morning (1992)
- Hallowe'en Night (1992)
- Love and a Bottle (1992)
- Twenty Grand (1998)
- Shiver (2003) – ISBN 978-0-413-77361-6
- The Last Summer (2012)
