= Lautaro Núñez Atencio =

Chilean historian

Lautaro Núñez
- Born: 24 January 1938 Iquique, Chile
- Occupation: Historian

Lautaro Núñez Atencio, (Iquique 24 January 1936) is a Chilean historian winner of the Chilean National History Award in 2002.

In June 1973 he participated in the Primer Congreso del Hombre Andino held in northern Chile and preserved in his personal archive various text from it as the 1973 Chilean coup d'état on September 11 hindered the publication of the conference proceedings.

== Bibliography ==
- La Tirana del Tamarugal : del misterio al sacramento, 1989
- Cultura y conflicto en los oasis de San Pedro de Atacama, 1992
- Gustavo Le Paige S.J. : cronología de una misión, 1993
- Reseña bibliográfica: El Dios Cautivo. Las Ligas Patrióticas en la chilenización compulsiva de Tarapacá (1910-1922), (2005)
