= Foot plough =

Manual agricultural tilling tool

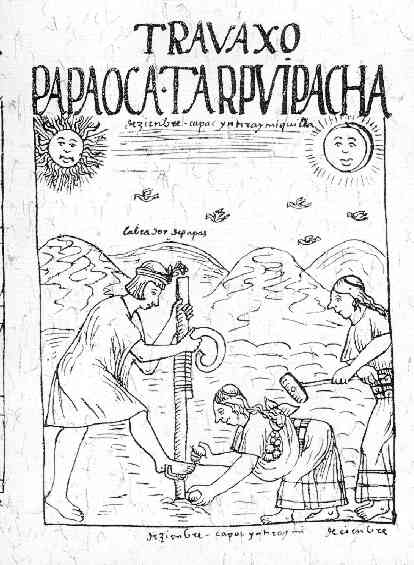
Illustration of Andean farmers using a chaki taklla "footplough", by Felipe Guaman Poma de Ayala, 1616.

The foot plough is a type of plough used like a spade with the foot in order to cultivate the ground.

== New Zealand ==
Before the widespread use of metal farming tools from Europe, the Māori people employed the kō, a type of foot plough made entirely of wood.

== Scotland ==
Prevalent in northwest Scotland, the Scottish Gaelic language contains many terms for the various varieties, for example cas-dhìreach 'straight foot' for the straighter variety and on, but cas-chrom 'bent foot' is the most common variety and refers to the crooked spade. The cas-chrom went out of use in the Hebrides in the early years of the 20th century.

Describing the Scottish Highlands around 1760, Samuel Smiles wrote:

The plough had not yet penetrated into the Highlands; an instrument called the cas-chrom, literally the "crooked foot"- the use of which had been forgotten for hundreds of years in every other country in Europe, was almost the only tool employed in tillage in those parts of the Highlands which were separated by almost impassable mountains from the rest of the United Kingdom. The cas-chrom was a rude combination of a lever for the removal of rocks, a spade to cut the earth, and a foot-plough to turn it. ... It weighed about eighteen pounds. In working it, the upper part of the handle, to which the left hand was applied, reached the workman's shoulder, and being slightly elevated, the point, shod with iron, was pushed into the ground horizontally; the soil being turned over by inclining the handle to the furrow side, at the same time making the heel act as a fulcrum to raise the point of the instrument. In turning up unbroken ground, it was first employed with the heel uppermost, with pushing strokes to cut the breadth of the sward to be turned over; after which, it was used horizontally as above described. We are indebted to a Parliamentary Blue Book for the following representation of this interesting relic of ancient agriculture. It is given in the appendix to the 'Ninth Report of the Commissioners for Highland Roads and Bridges,' ordered by the House of Commons to be printed,19th April, 1821.

It was an implement of tillage peculiar to the Highlands, used for turning the ground where an ordinary plough could not work on account of the rough, stony, uneven ground. It is of great antiquity and is described as follows by Armstrong:

It is inexpeditious in comparison with the plough, eight men being necessary to dig as much with it in one day, as a horse would plough in the same time. It is chiefly used for tillage, and consists of a crooked piece of wood, the lower end somewhat thick, about two-and-a-half feet in length, pretty straight, and armed at the end with iron made thin and square to cut the earth. The upper end of this instrument is called the ‘shaft’, and the lower the ‘head’. The shaft above the crook is pretty straight, being six feet long, and tapering towards the end which is slender. Just below the crook or angle, there must be a hole wherein a straight peg must be fixed, for the workman’s right foot in order to push the instrument into the earth; while in the mean time, standing on his left foot, and holding the shaft firmly with both hands, when he has in this manner driven the head into the earth, with one bend of his body he raises the clod by the iron-headed part of the instrument, making use of the ‘heel’ or hind part of the head as a fulcrum. In so doing, he turns it over, always to the left hand and then proceeds to push for another clod in the same form. To see six or eight men all at work with this instrument, standing on one leg and pushing with the other, would be a curious sight to a stranger. With all of its disadvantages, the cas-chrom is, of all the instruments, fittest for turning up the ground in the country, for among so many rocks, a plough can do little or nothing, and where there are no rocks, the ground is generally so marshy that cattle are not able to pass over it without sinking in deeply.

In the Western Isles, with a foot plough, one man can perhaps do the work of four men with an ordinary spade, and while it is disadvantaged compared to a horse-plough, it is well suited to the country.

== South America ==
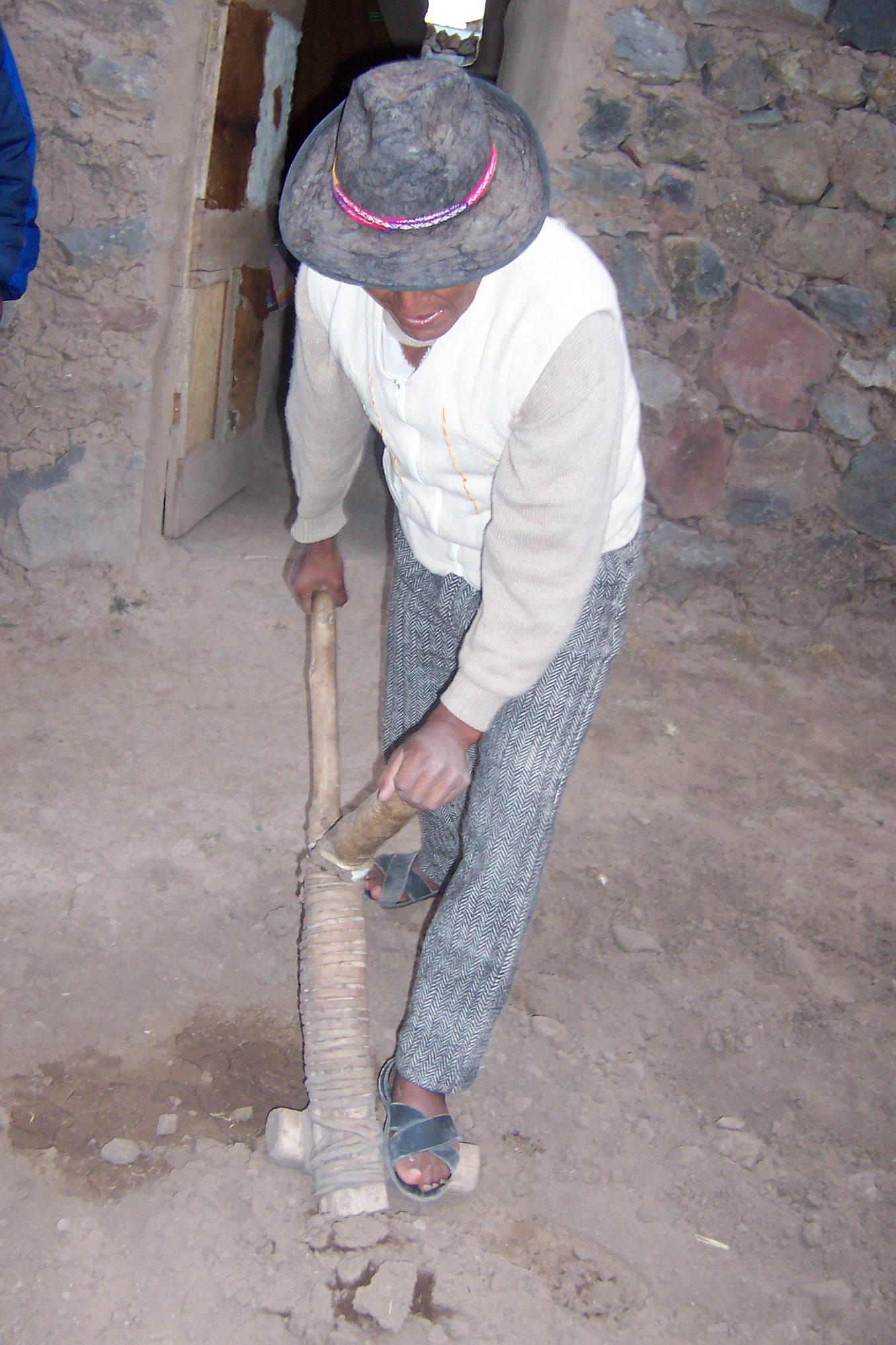
A farmer using the chaki taklla in the village of Hatunqulla, Puno Region, Peru

The foot plough was also used by Peruvians circa 1600. The Inca King and accompanying provincial lords used foot ploughs in the "opening of the earth" ritual at the beginning of the agricultural cycle. Incan agriculture used the chaki taklla or taklla, a type of foot plough.

== See also ==
- Laia - the Basque h-shaped tool, also described as a foot plough.
- Lazybed, a form of agriculture
- Loy
