= Primer Congreso del Hombre Andino =

Primer Congreso del Hombre Andino (First Conference of the Andean Man) was an academic conference in northern Chile organized by the northern branch of the University of Chile in June 1973. Its subject was the Indigenous societies of the Andean world, be these modern, historical or archaeological. The conference was an important milestone in the development of Andean studies including Andean archaeology and for Chile it marked the maturation of academic studies carried out by scholars based in its northern cities.

== Origin and organization ==
According to Lautaro Núñez he and other archaeologists at the regional see of the University of Chile in Antofagasta (today the University of Antofagasta) organized the conference as they saw a need for a more interdisciplinary study of the marginalized Indigenous communities they often encountered in their work. From Antofagasta the university sees at Iquique and Arica were invited to participate in the organization of the event. The initiative was supported by the Allende administration given its desire for more local participation on academic affairs. The archaeologist and anthropologist Luis Guillermo Lumbreras, based in Lima, recalls he and some Peruvian colleagues readily accepted Núñez invitation as they admittedly failed to carry out a similar Indigenous-focused event of the same magnitude in the wake of the more successful Congreso de Americanistas of 1970 held in Lima. In Chile the conference was preceded by the Primer Congreso Nacional de Científicos held in 1972 in Santiago.

The symposium "The role of the Andean society in the transition to socialism" emerged from discussions in the organizing committee on the future of the Andean society in view that the government at the time in Chile promoted transformations that were intended to lead the country to a socialist economic and social system.

== Description ==
It was organized as an interdisciplinary conference centered on the social sciences. It was unusual in that it moved around between three cities; Arica, Iquique and Antofagasta. The conference is thought to have signaled the academic maturation of northern Chile. Despite the politicized atmosphere of the time the conference was not aligned with any of the prevailing political discourses of the 1970s. Recurrent themes at the conferred were that of an "ethnic crisis" in the Andes or a "crisis of the Andean society". Some views expressed in the conference argued the "crisis" was an expression of a class struggle yet other views in the conference saw it more of a result of the interaction of the Andean culture with the modern city. Other notable subjects dealt with in conference reports was a discussion on the themes of nomadism, transhumance and the vertical archipelago and a discussion on the rights of the "national proletariat, the Andean farmer and farmers in general". News of the failed Tanquetazo coup on June 29 disrupted the conference leading to its premature end.

Some notable participants were Ana María Lorandi and Carlota Sempé from Argentina, Julia Fortún from Bolivia, Luis Guillermo Lumbreras from Peru, John Victor Murra from the United States, and Manuel Mamani, Gustavo Le Paige, Hans Niemeyer, Lautaro Núñez and Oreste Plath from Chile. The inaugural address was held by Professor Alejandro Lipschutz.

The following symposiums were held:

1. Migration and crisis in the Andean society
2. Verticality and pre-European Andean colonization
3. Basic problems of the study of Andean folklore
4. The role of the Andean society in the transition to socialism
5. Handicraft as stimuli for Andean development
6. Groundwork for the development of the Andean society in northern Chile
7. Basic problems of the hunter-gatherer stage: Transhumance
8. Basic problems of the pre-European Andean farmer society stage: The farming revolution and the process of agriculturization

== Aftermath ==
The military intervention of the universities that followed the 1973 Chilean coup d'état on September 11 hindered the publication of the conference proceedings. In 2023 for the 50th anniversary of the conference, Lautaro Núñez, one of the organizers who had also kept in his private archive the texts that existed at the moment of the coup, published the proceedings.

Freddy Taberna (b. 1943), a member of the Socialist Party of Chile and the organizer of the symposium "The role of the Andean society in the transition to socialism", was court-martialled for treason and executed by Augusto Pinochet's newly installed military regime on October 30, 1973. His corpse was tossed into the ocean with concrete to sink.
