= John Victor Murra =

Ukrainian-American anthropologist (1916–2006)

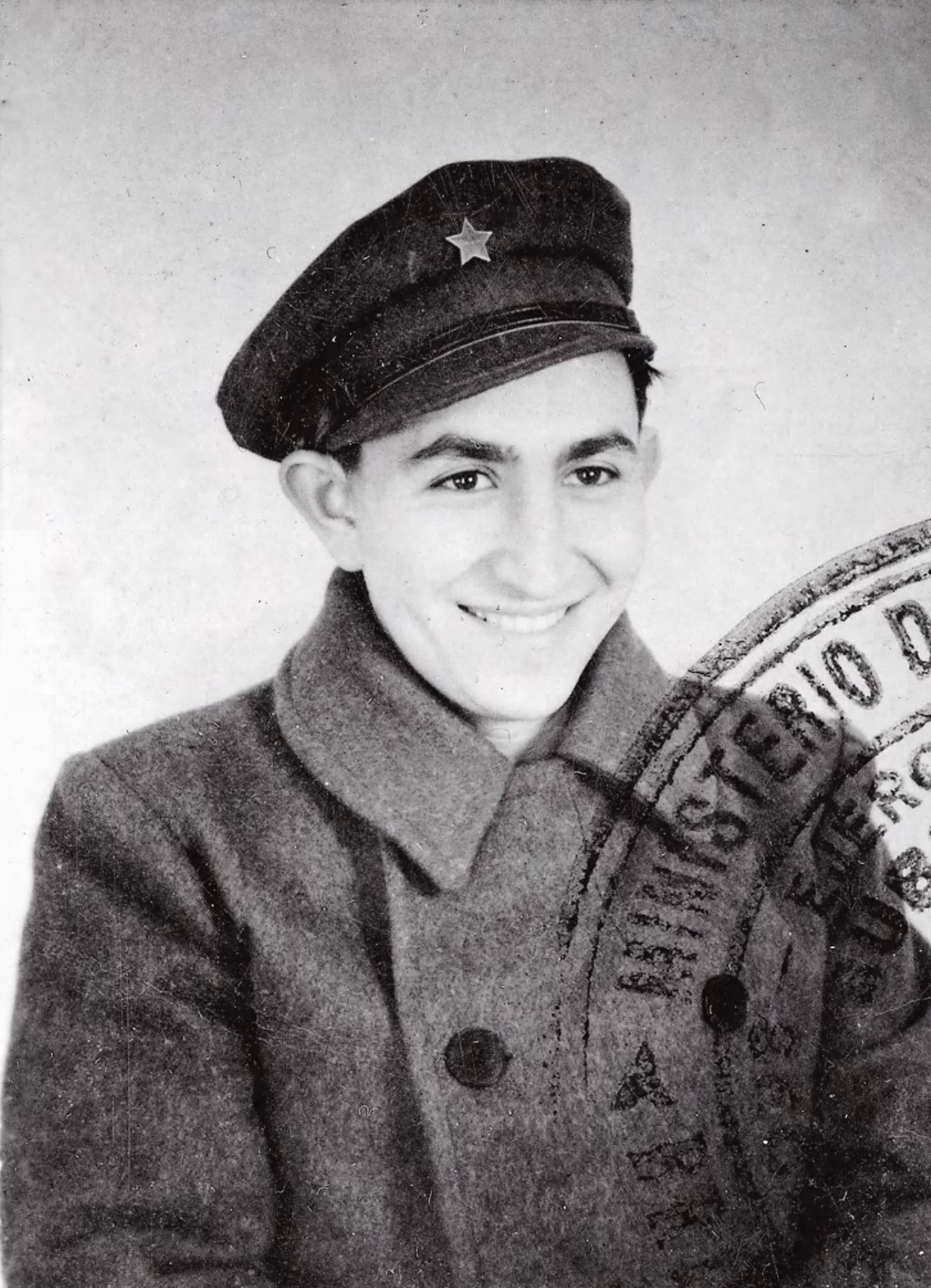
- Murra's ID photo c. 1937–1939
- Born: Isak Lipschitz; August 24, 1916; Odesa, Kherson Governorate, Russian Empire
- Died: October 16, 2006 (aged 90); Ithaca, New York, U.S.
- Spouse: Virginia

Academic background
- Education: University of Chicago

Academic work
- Discipline: Anthropologist
- Sub-discipline: Inca Empire researcher
- Military career
- Allegiance: Spanish Republic
- Branch: International Brigades
- Service years: 1937–1939
- Rank: Corporal
- Units: The "Abraham Lincoln" XV International Brigade
- Conflicts: Spanish Civil War; Battle of the Ebro (WIA); La Retirada

John Victor Murra (August 24, 1916 – October 16, 2006) was a Ukrainian-born Jewish American professor of anthropology and a researcher of the Inca Empire.

== Early life and education ==
Murra was born Isak Lipschitz to Romanian Jewish parents on August 24, 1916, in Odesa, Ukraine (then part of the Russian Empire) and moved as a child to Bucharest, Romania, where he grew up. He emigrated to the United States in 1934 and completed an undergraduate degree in sociology at the University of Chicago in 1936. Around this time, he was branch president of the Young Communist League.

In February 1937, Murra sailed to Europe to fight for the Second Spanish Republic in the Spanish Civil War as a member of the International Brigades. In Spain he learned fluent Spanish and "acquired the permanent nom de guerre John Victor Murra." He initially smuggled volunteers out of Perpignan, France, then entered Spain in April, serving in the Brigade's general staff as a clerk, interpreter and aide to Bill Lawrence, Will Paynter, Wally Tapsell and Bob Kerr. He was later transferred to the Abraham Lincoln Brigade and was wounded in action in July 1938, during the Battle of the Ebro. Upon his recovery in February 1939, he was discharged from the Republican Army and was interned in the Argelers concentration camp on his way home. His injuries later medically precluded him from service in World War II.

Returning to the United States in 1939, Murra returned to Illinois to continue his studies at the University of Chicago. He finished a master's degree in 1942 and a PhD in 1956, both in anthropology.

== Career ==
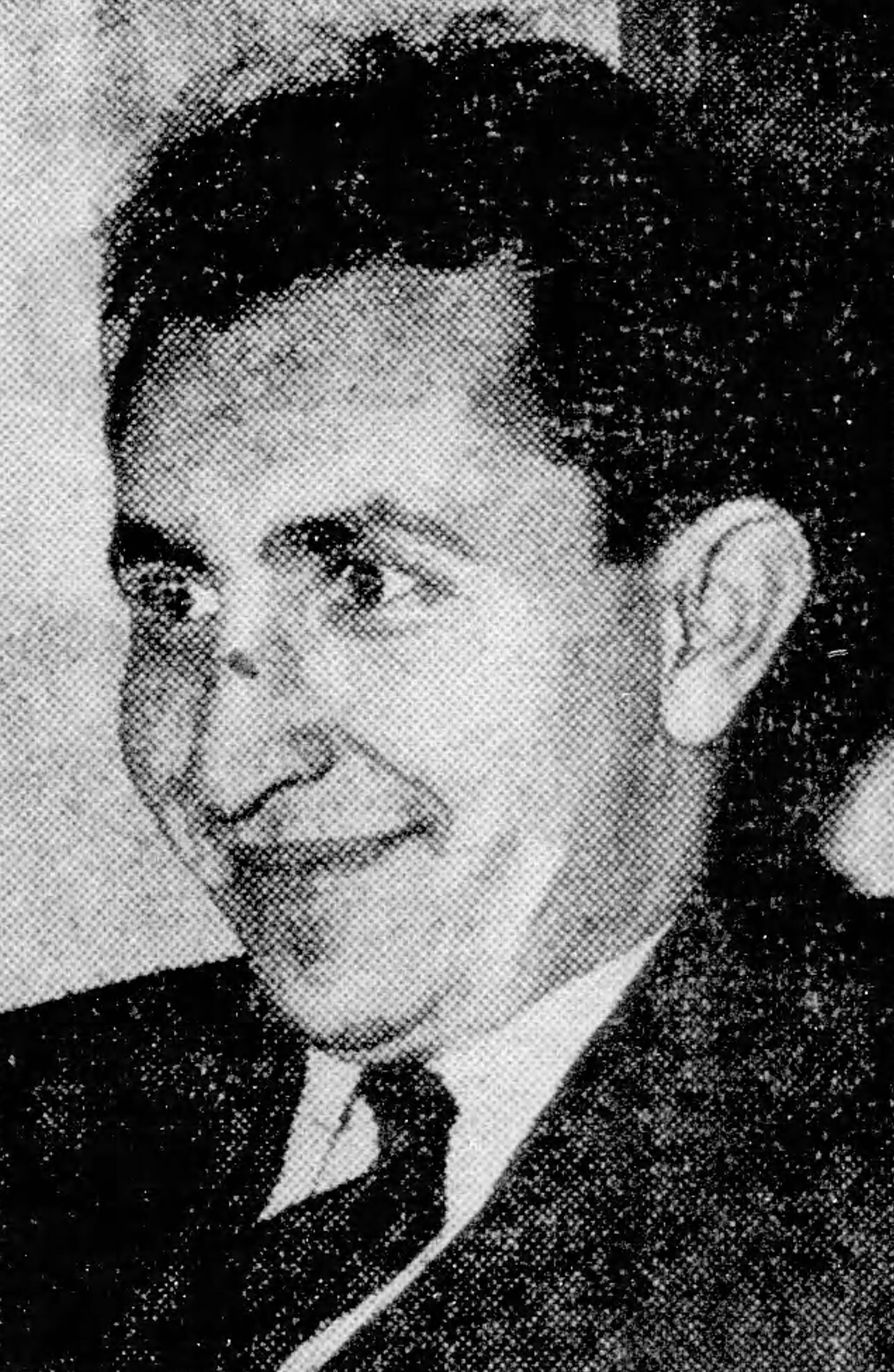
Murra c. 1948

Murra taught at the University of Puerto Rico (1947–50), Vassar College (1950–61), Yale University (1962–63), Universidad de San Marcos (1964–66), and Cornell University (1968–82).

His work included the development of a new perspective of the Inca Empire, where trade and giftgiving among kin were common. Through extensive perusal of Spanish colonial archives and court documents, he found that the Inca dwelling in the rainforest hiked into the Andes to trade crops for products like wool from their mountain-dwelling kin. Murra called that "the vertical archipelago", and his model has been verified by later research. Some contest components of the theory, but it has become the accepted economic model of the Central Andes.

Murra's writings include The Economic Organization of the Inca State (1956), Cloth and its Functions in the Inca State (1962), and El mundo andino: población, medio ambiente y economía (2002). After his retirement, he worked at the National Museum of Ethnography in La Paz, Bolivia.

In June 1973 Murra, having established contacts with local academics participated in the Primer Congreso del Hombre Andino held in northern Chile.

He died in his home in Ithaca, New York, on October 16, 2006.
