= Loy (spade) =

Old Irish ploughing tool

Loy (spade)

A loy is an early Irish spade with a long heavy handle made of ash, a narrow steel plate on the face and a single footrest. The word loy comes from the Irish word láí (Old Irish láige, Proto-Celtic *laginā), which means "spade". It was used for manual ploughing prior to and during the Great Famine.

== Construction ==
The loy is a narrow spade with a blade about 35 cm (14 inches) long by 7.5 cm (3 inches) wide and bent with a handle 1.5 to 1.8 m (5 to 6 feet) long. The handle is normally made of ash. The blade has a single step for use with the right or left foot.

== Ridging using the loy ==
The loy was traditionally used for cultivating the potato. In the 19th century, these were grown in a potato ridge, sometimes known as a lazy bed. Sods were turned from either side to form the ridge. This was sometimes called "copin the sods", and the sods forming the sides of the ridge were called cope sods. A sod of earth about 2 feet (60 cm) wide on each side of the intended ridge was lifted by the loy and turned over so that the grassy sides were together. Manure was spread on the ridge part first. Narrow ridges were most often made with sets of around twelve sods. Loy ploughing took place on very small farms or on very hilly ground, where horses could not work or where farmers could not afford them and were used up until the 1960s in poorer land. This suited the moist climate of Ireland as the trenches formed by turning in the sods provided drainage. It also allowed the growing of potatoes in bogs as well as on mountain slopes where no other cultivation could take place.

== Other uses ==
As well as ploughing and ridgemaking, the loy was also used for lifting potatoes and digging turf. Loy digging is still a popular pastime in Ireland with a national Loy Digging Association. Loy digging is an integral part of the National Ploughing Championships.

== The loy in culture ==
=== Theatre ===
The Playboy of the Western World by Irish playwright John Millington Synge, set in a public house in County Mayo during the early 1900s, tells the story of Christy Mahon, a young man running away from his farm. Mahon claims he killed his father by driving a loy into his head.

=== Literature ===
Irish writer Declan Hughes' novels centre around the detective Ed Loy, whose name is a homage to Sam Spade, the fictional character of Dashiell Hammett's The Maltese Falcon.

== See also ==
- Foot plough
