= Carlota Sempé =

Argentine archaeologist (1942–2024)

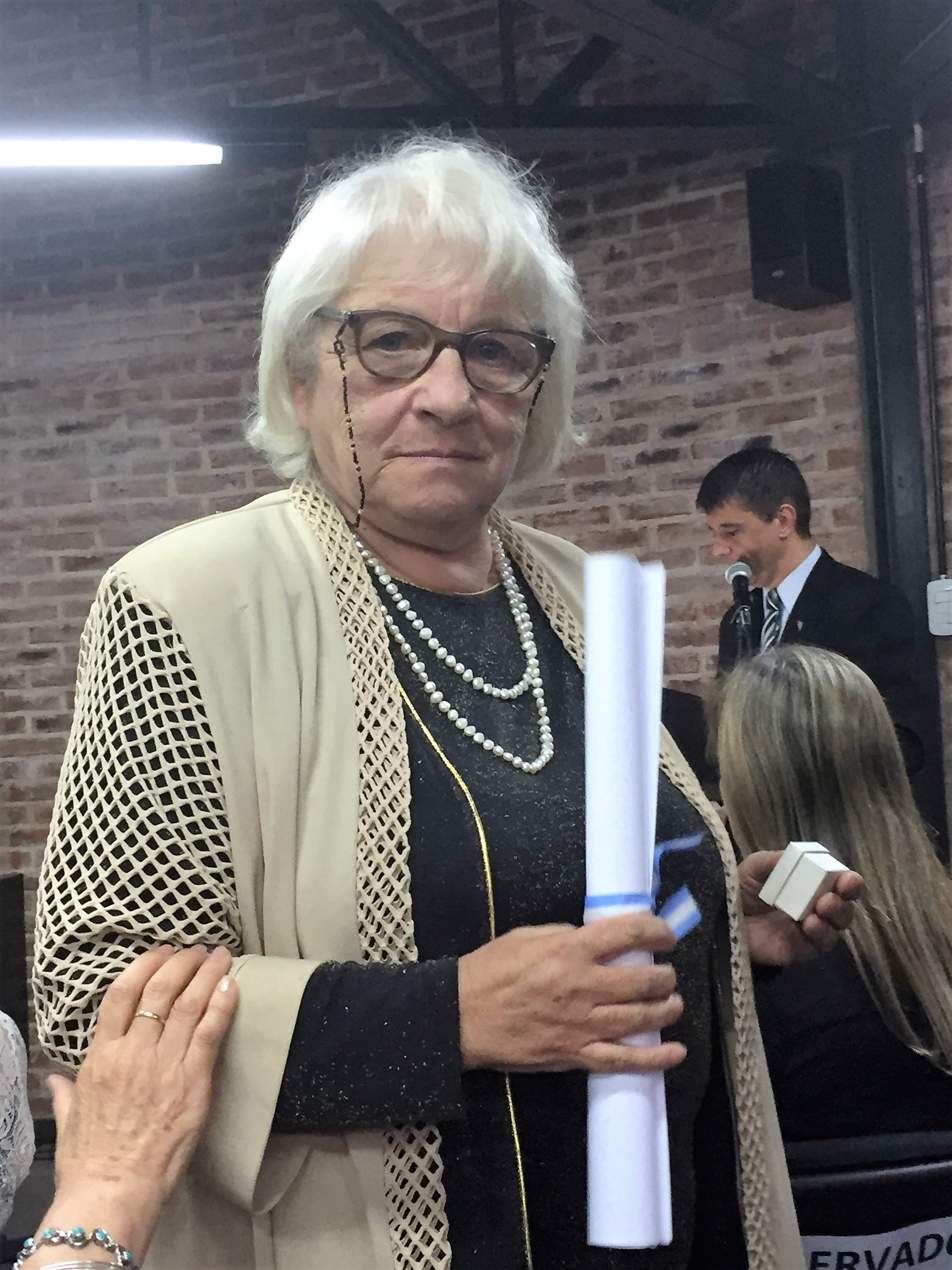
- Carlota Sempé in 2015
- Born: María Carlota Sempé; 6 December 1942; La Plata, Buenos Aires Province, Argentina
- Died: 1 February 2024 (aged 81); La Plata, Buenos Aires Province, Argentina
- Education: National University of La Plata
- Occupations: Archeologist, teacher, scientific researcher
- Employer: National Scientific and Technical Research Council
- Awards: Konex Prize (2016)

María Carlota Sempé (6 December 1942 – 1 February 2024) was an Argentine archaeologist, teacher and scientific researcher who specialised in the pre-Hispanic cultures of Northwest Argentina, the Littoral and urban heritage cemeteries.

== Biography ==
In 1967 Sempé graduated in anthropology at the Faculty of Natural Sciences and Museum of the National University of La Plata, and in 1976 she obtained the degree of Doctor in Natural Sciences at the same university.

Sempé died on 1 February 2024, at the age of 81.

== Career ==
Her research topic for her Ph.D. degree was Contribution to the Archaeology of the Abaucán Valley, Catamarca. This work was carried out under the direction of Alberto Rex Gonzalez. During his career he devoted himself on the one hand to the study of the funerary field, practices, architecture, cultural environment and identity in different socio-historical formations, and on the other hand to art in archaeology, mainly the ceramic representations of Northwest Argentina, particularly in Catamarca. In her teaching career she worked as a professor of art, Technology and Anthropology. In particular, she developed research on architecture, urbanism and Masonic symbology in urban cemeteries.

In 1973 she participated in the Primer Congreso del Hombre Andino held in northern Chile with a presentation on the farmer cultures of the Abaucán Valley in the Tinogasta Department.

In her career as a scientific researcher at CONICET she achieved the category of principal investigator. For 45 years she has researched in the Hualfín and Abaucán valleys of the province of Catamarca, contributing with the systematization of 21 sites of indigenous cultural development, the definition of the Saujil and Abaucán cultures and a hundred dates in both valleys that confirm the temporal location of those developments.

In 2016 she was awarded the Konex Prize. She was named professor emeritus at the Universidad Nacional De La Plata and outstanding Platense woman by the Municipality of the city of La Plata.

Sempé was director of the Ceramic Analysis Laboratory of the FCNYM-UNLP and of the Center for Scientific and Cultural Heritage, FACEN, UNCatamarca where she was a member of the academic committees of the Master in Conservation and Environmental Management, of the PhD in Sciences Mention Environment. She directed the project for the establishment of human resources of the ANPCyT, UNCatamarca. She directed doctoral students, fellows and researchers at UNLP, UNCatamarca and CONICET. She researched pre-Hispanic cultures of the NOA, littoral and urban heritage cemeteries.

Sempé published articles in national and international journals, congresses, and books co-authored with his research groups: Azampay.

Sempé was a member of the Iberoamerican and Argentinian networks of Valorization and Management of heritage cemeteries.
