= Luis Guillermo Lumbreras =

Peruvian archaeologist and anthropologist (1936–2023)

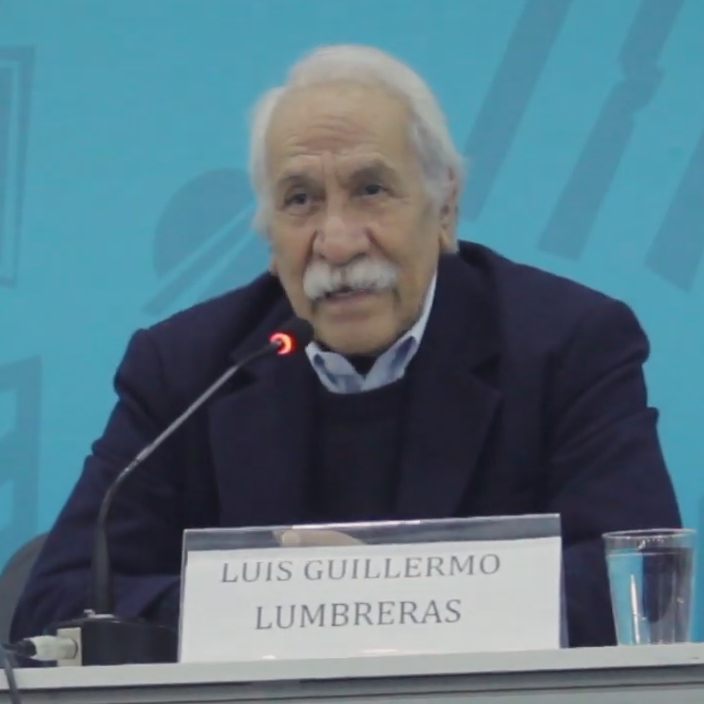
- Lumbreras in 2019
- Born: 29 July 1936; Ayacucho, Peru
- Died: 9 November 2023 (aged 87); Lima, Peru
- Education: National University of San Marcos
- Occupations: Archaeologist anthropologist

Luis Guillermo Lumbreras Salcedo (29 July 1936 – 9 November 2023) was a Peruvian archaeologist, anthropologist and academic.

== Life and career ==
Born in Ayacucho, Lumbreras graduated in archaeology and ethnology at the National University of San Marcos. The main object of his studies was the origin of civilization in Peru, for which he theorized a fusion of autochthonous and foreign elements.

Lumbreras served as professor at his alma mater, at the National University of Education Enrique Guzmán y Valle, at the National Agrarian University and at the San Cristóbal of Huamanga University. He also served as director of the National Institute of Culture, director of the National Museum of Archaeology, Anthropology and History of Peru and president of the Museo de la Nación. He founded the Andean Institute of Archaeological Studies and co-founded the State University of Northern Rio de Janeiro.

In June 1973 Lumbreras was one of the academics who participated in the Primer Congreso del Hombre Andino held in northern Chile.

During his career Lumbreras received various honours and accolades, including the National Culture Prize, the National Prize for Scientific Research and the Humboldt Prize.

== Death ==
He died in Lima on 9 November 2023, at the age of 87.
