= Chasqui =

Inca messengers

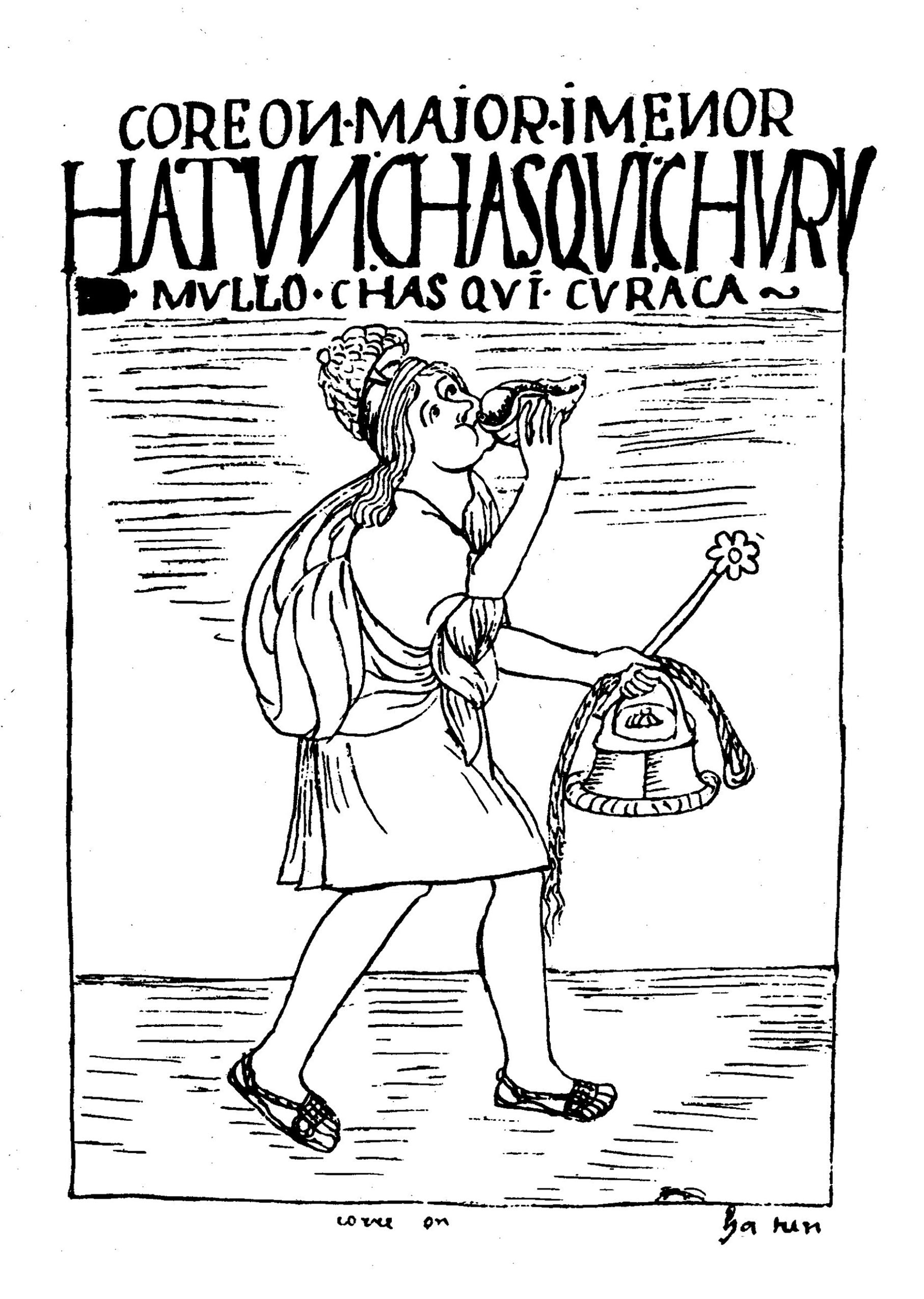
Chasqui playing a pututu (conch shell) in "Primer nueva corónica y buen gobierno" (drawing 168 folio 351).

A chasqui (also spelled chaski) was a messenger of the Inca Empire. Agile, highly trained and physically fit, they were in charge of carrying messages in the form of quipus, oral information, or small packets. Along the Inca road system there were relay stations called chaskiwasi (house of chasqui), placed at about 2.5 kilometres (1.6 mi) from each other, where the chasqui switched, exchanging their message(s) with the fresh messenger. The chasqui system could deliver a message or a gift along a distance of up to 300 kilometres (190 mi) per day.

== The Incas ==
The name chasqui is derived from the Quechua word chaski (plural chaskikuna) meaning "reception, acceptance, consent" and historically "postilion". According to Inca Garcilaso de la Vega, the Spanish−Inca chronicler and writer of the 16th Century, the word chasqui means "the one who exchanges". The name cacha (spelled kacha in modern Quechua), meaning messenger in Quechua, was not used, but rather it was used to mention ambassadors or personal messengers, "who personally went from one prince to another or from the lord to the subject."

== Chasqui relay system ==
These 'chasques' were employed in this kingdom. They were the sons of curacas [local chiefs] who were loyal. Each runner had a white feather sunshade on his head which he wore so that the next chasque would see him at a distance. The chasque also carried a trumpet called 'putoto' [shell] so that the next runner would be ready. The arms they carried were the 'champi' [a star-headed club] and a 'uaraca' [sling].

These chasques were paid by the Inca, and they got their food from his storehouses. Each 'churo chasque' [chasqui carrying a shell] was stationed at intervals of one-half league [2.5 kilometres (1.6 mi)] so he could run the distance quickly. They say that they could bring a snail alive from the New Kingdom of Granada to the Inca in Cuzco.

— Felipe Guaman Poma de Ayala, 1615

The chasquis were used to carry the king's orders in short time to the provinces or to the army commanders and bring news and notices important for the kingdom, the war and the provinces to Cusco, the capital of the Inca Empire.

Along the Inca roads relay stations were placed at half a league distance, where a league is about 5 kilometres (3.1 mi) or an hour walking. At each station, four to six slim, fit and young chasquis would stand in wait, with a roof or a hut to protect them from the sun and the rain. They carried the messages in turns in one direction or the other. The waiting chasquis would constantly surveil the road to spot the incoming runner, the latter of which shouted within sight of the hut and played his seashell trumpet, in order to alert the new one to take his place. He gave his message, repeating it more than once, until the new chasqui understood it perfectly. This way the message was never lost.

The huts were light constructions and were always placed in an elevated position and in such a way that they could see each other. According to Inca Garcialso the distance was just one quarter of a league "because they said that that was what an Indian could run with lightness and breath, without getting tired"; other chroniclers report distances of half a league or 2.5 kilometres (1.6 mi).

The chasquis also carried other messages, in the form of quipus (from the Quechua word khipu meaning 'knot') which contained mainly numbers in an ordered form. Quipus could represent the amount of taxes to be paid by a village or a province or the number of soldiers to be moved. There is no evidence that the chasquis could read the quipus, which was a delicate and difficult task carried out by khipukamayoq (experts in writing and reading quipu); in practice, it was not necessary for the chasquis to have access to the information they delivered.

In case of grave emergencies such as an invasion or an uprising, bonfires were used during the night and smoke columns during the day. According to Inca Garcilaso the Inca would receive the distress message "within two or three hours at the most (even if it was five or six hundred leagues [250 to 300 kilometres (160 to 190 mi)] from the court)".

== Origin of the chasqui service ==
According to the chronicle of Pedro Sarmiento de Gamboa the chasqui service was established by Pachacuti Inca Yupanqui who had extended his empire very much towards the north and who needed to have fresh daily reports from all the provinces of his vast kingdom, thus he ordered his brother and captain general, Capac Yupanqui, to establish the system.

On the other hand Juan de Betanzos states that it was Viracocha Inca, predecessor of Pachacuti who "ordered that there be markers of leagues on the royal roads" and "that all the royal roads be populated with chasques, in each league marker four chasques, so that with the mandates and provisions of the lnga, in a short time, they can run the earth"

Martín de Murúa states instead that it was Topa Inca Yupanqui Pachacuti's son, who ordered "to put couriers on all the roads, which they call chasques, with such order and concert that they admire, which were on the roads, at intervals each one about a crossbow shot, and sometimes closer, and others were at half a league distance".

== Logistic arrangement ==
=== Royal road ===
The Inca road system, known as Qhapaq Ñan (meaning "royal road" in Quechua) was the most extensive and advanced transportation system in pre-Columbian South America. As a whole it was about 40,000 kilometres (25,000 mi) long The network was composed of formal roads carefully planned, engineered, built, marked and maintained; paved where necessary, with stairways to gain elevation, bridges and accessory constructions such as retaining walls, and water drainage systems. It was based on two north–south roads: one along the coast and the second and most important inland and up the mountains, both with numerous branches. The road system allowed for the transfer of information, goods, soldiers and persons, without the use of wheels, within the Tawantinsuyu or Inca Empire throughout a territory covering almost 2,000,000 km^{2} (770,000 sq mi) and inhabited by about 12 million people.

The roads were bordered, at intervals, with buildings to allow the most effective usage: at short distance there were chasquiwasi, relay stations for chasquis; at a one-day walking interval tambos allowed support to the road users and flocks of llama pack animals. Administrative centers with warehouses, called qullqas, for re-distribution of goods were found along the roads. Towards the boundaries of the Inca Empire and in newly conquered areas pukaras (fortresses) were found.

=== Tambo ===
The tambos were perhaps the most important buildings in the operations of the road network. They were constructions of varied architecture and size whose function was mainly the lodging of the travellers and the storage of products for their supply. For this reason, they were located at a day's journey interval, although irregularities were identified in their distances probably linked to various factors such as the presence of water sources, the existence of land with agricultural produce or the presence of pre-Inca centers. Tambos were so frequent that many Andean regional place names include the word tambo in them.

Garcilaso de la Vega underlines the presence of infrastructure (tambos) on the Inka road system where lodging posts for state officials and chasquis were ubiquitous across the Inca empire; they were well spaced and well provisioned. Food, clothes and weapons were stored and ready also for the Inka army marching through the territory.

The chaskiwasis (sometimes spelled chasquihuasi and meaning house of chasqui in Quechua) were relay stations and accommodations for the chasquis: the buildings were of small dimensions having an architecture probably linked to local traditions. Even if they were more frequent than tambos, there is little evidence and research on them. A research published in 2006 under the 'Qhapaq Ñan Project' of the National Institute of Culture in Peru, based on surveys along the Inca road system, revealed that chaskiwasis were not present on all the Inca roads. It is not yet defined if this was a planned decision, because that road part was not useful for information transfer, or simply there is no current evidence of them due to their poor construction. The chaskiwasis were an integral part of the routes and defined some of the most characteristic aspects of the operation of the road network that called the attention of the first Spaniards that was reflected in the chronicles, as was the speed in the transmission of messages and small goods for the Inka.

According to several chroniclers (e.g. Garcilaso de la Vega, Guaman Poma de Ayala, Juan de Betanzos, Pedro Sarmiento de Gamboa) the average distance between two chaskiwasi was half a league that means about 2.5 kilometres (1.6 mi) as in the case of tambos the distance must have been determined by the environment, keeping into account the soil characteristics, the climate, and the elevation above sea level. Polo de Ondegardo states that the distance was one and a half league meaning about 7.5 kilometres (4.7 mi) which D'Altroy takes as a reference writing that the distance was 6 to 9 kilometres (3.7 to 5.6 mi).

The minimum manpower of a chaskiwasi was four runners, a couple resting and the others waiting as sentinels for an incoming chasqui. The chasqui patrol was exchanged for a fresh one every month. The chasqui service was active 24 hours a day and its speed was even faster than the European message services in the same historical period and until the invention of the telegraph.

The Peruvian architect Santiago Agurto Calvo –professor and rector of the National University of Engineering in Lima– cites Von Hagen's experiment along the Inca road in the Mantaro Valley between Jauja and Bonbón which demonstrated that young Quechuas, having no special training, could run the distance of 1 kilometre (0.62 mi) in about 4 minutes and keep this pace for about 5 kilometres (3.1 mi). This means that in 1 hour 15 to 20 kilometres (9.3 to 12.4 mi) could be covered, summing up to 360 to 480 kilometres (220 to 300 mi) per day. For the Inca emperor, getting fresh fish in Cusco was really possible.

== Chasquis in the chronicles ==
=== Guaman Poma de Ayala ===
Guaman Poma de Ayala in his manuscript "Primer nueva corónica y buen gobierno", preserved in the Copenhagen Royal Library mentions and depicts the chasquis twice.

The first is drawing 138 at folio 351 (see above) It describes the chasquis operations and adds that: "These chasques were under the authority of Inca princes, auquicona, [royal princes, plural of awki] in the kingdom so no mistakes would be made. This Inca would visit the chasques to make sure they did nothing wrong and that they had sufficient food. As has been stated, the chasques were authorized to take provisions from the Inca’s storehouses. These chasques were not replaced by others because they had to be faithful, sons of well-known curacas, not be lazy, and able to fly like a deer or a hawk. Their wives and children were protected because the runners had to be on call day and night. They had chacras (fields or farms) and livestock in the same place, and everything they needed. They were not to be missing over one hour"

The second one is drawing 306 at folio 825.

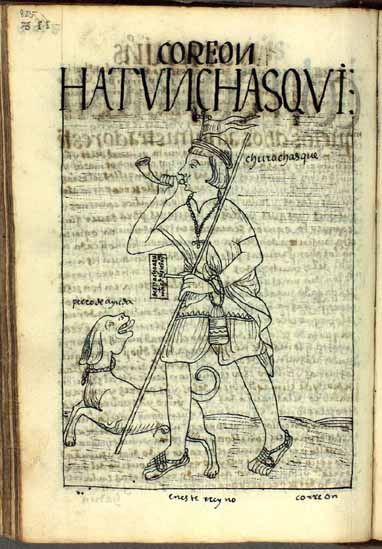
The second image of a chasqui in the First New Chronicle and Good Government by Guamán Poma de Ayala

"It has to be known that the Ynga king had two kinds of runners in this kingdom. The first one is named churo mullo chasque (postilion that brings snail) or major runner who could bring [sea] snails from more than 500 leagues, since mulo is the sea snail of the new kingdom. They were placed at a distance of half a league. And the lesser runner was named caro chasque (messenger of snail) was placed at a day distance [to carry] heavy things. And these runners must be sons of chiefs, of loyal and proved knights, as fast as a deer these were paid and equipped by the Inca as lord and king. And he (the chasqui) was wearing on his head a big feather sunshade that covered his head in order to be seen from far away and a trumpet that was called huaylla quipa (the snail horn). They (the chasquis) were shouting very loud and playing their trumpet and as a weapon they carried a chanbi (fighting club) and a sling. And this is how the land was managed by this runners. They and their wives and sons, father, mother, brothers and sisters were free form anything that there was [taxes and services for the Inca]. He never stopped day and night. In each chasqui (house) there were four diligent Indians in this kingdom. The mentioned king's runners chasque shall have their salary from his majesty of the royal road."

=== Garcilaso Inca de la Vega ===
In his Los Comentarios Reales de los Incas, published in 1609 (chapter VII), Garcilaso describes the chasquis and their operations. Most of the description of operation are taken from this book.

=== Juan de Betanzos ===
He supports the speed of the chasquis by stating: "They asked me how many months it would take to go from there to Cuzco; I told them that there were two roads from there to Cuzco, and that one went along the sea coast and the other went through the mountains, and I told them that if the Indians walked from there to Cuzco, it would take three or four months, going little by little, and if they went through the posts (the chsquis) in five or six days the news of what they wanted to let him know would reach the Ynga."

=== Martín de Murúa ===
Murúa confirms that "When the Inca wanted to eat fresh fish from the sea, since it was seventy or eighty leagues [350 to 400 kilometres (220 to 250 mi)] (from the coast) to Cuzco, where he lived, they would bring it to him alive, which indeed seems an incredible thing over such a long stretch and distance, and on such roads, rough and intricate"

Murúa gives also fresh information about the speed of the chasquis and the punishments they were given in case they became lazy. First of all the chasquis needed to be searched "among the Indians for those who were quickest and fastest, and who had the most courage to run, and so he (the Inca) tested them, making them run across a plain and, later, go down a hill with the same lightness, and then climb a rough slope, without stopping, and to those who stood out in this and did it well, he assigned the courier task and they had to train every day in the race. So that, they were so encouraged that they reached the deer and even vicuñas, which are very fast wild animals that breed in the coldest places and deserts. Thus, with incredible flight, they carried the news from one place to another, and those who did not run well, and were lazy, were punished by giving them fifty blows to the head with a club, or fifty blows to the back, and their legs were broken, for memory and punishment of others."

The chasquis according to Murúa were raised since children "with great care and only once a day they were fed […] and only once they drank, and thus they were skinny, and the parents tested them if they were fast, making them run uphill and follow a deer, and if they were lazy they were punished in the same way, so that the entire caste and generation of Chasquis Indians was fast and light, and for a long time."

Murúa regrets the progressive disappearance of the chasquis system, which was an extremely effective communication system for the Andean zone, stating that the service " is not performed nowadays with the punctuality and care of the past, in the times of the Inca, because then the distance of [the run of] these couriers was small, and thus the notices ran very quickly, without stopping for a single moment anywhere, not even for the chasqui to take a break and breathe. But now the journeys are five or six leagues, and from tambo to tambo." This is a confirmation that the chaskiwasi were already non-functioning in 1613.

=== Polo de Ondegardo ===
Polo de Ondegardo was not a chronicler, he was a Spanish colonial jurist, civil servant, businessman and thinker. He did not publish any book, nevertheless he produced several manuscript reports for the viceroy. One of them includes a chapter about the chasquis. There he describes their operation and measures a distance between chaskiwasi of one and a half league, which is three times the distance stated by other chroniclers. Moreover he confirms that at each relay station there were at least four men, night and day, that served for a term of one month. The incoming chasqui and the one waiting exchanged the message without stopping. Ondegardo confirms that the 500 leagues "which is very rough ground" from Quito to Cusco could be traveled in less than 20 days back and forth and "it is to be believed, because later here when there have been wars and other needs on earth, we (the Spaniards) have used this remedy of the chasquis" [...] "and there is no doubt that between one day and one night they must have covered fifty leagues as they say […] and I have received letters at the rate of thirty-five leagues in just one day and one night. Other times I have seen letters arrive from Lima to Cuzco in four days, which are one hundred and twenty leagues, almost all rough roads and very difficult to walk."

== Modern day ==
There are several paths that were used by the chasquis that still stand today. There are trails that allow one to travel along these paths and to experience the distance and terrain that the chasquis traveled.

== See also ==
- Tambo (Inca structure)
- Inca road system
- Chasqui I
