= Tambo (Inca structure) =

Inca military and administrative structure

A tambo (Quechua: tampu, "inn") was an Inca structure built for administrative and military purposes. Found along the extensive roads, tambos typically contained supplies, served as lodging for itinerant state personnel, and were depositories of quipu-based accounting records. Individuals from nearby communities within the Inca empire were conscripted to maintain and serve in the tambos, as part of the mit'a labor system. Tambos were spaced along Inca roads, generally about one day's travel apart.

== Characteristics and functions ==
The Incas built many of their tambos when they began to upgrade their empire-wide road system during the reign of Thupa Inka Yupanki from 1471 to 1493. Scholars estimate there were 2,000 or more tambos. Given this amount, the sheer variety of tambo size and function are hard to fully describe. At a minimum, tambos would contain housing, cooking facilities, and storage silos called qullqas. Beyond this, a considerable amount of variation between different tambos exists. Some tambos were little more than simple inns, while others were essentially cities that provided temporary housing for travelers. Further, there are no clear markers that distinguish larger tambos from villages or small administrative centers. Architecture and documentary evidence suggest that the functional sizes of the settlements probably corresponded to their capacity to house a population.

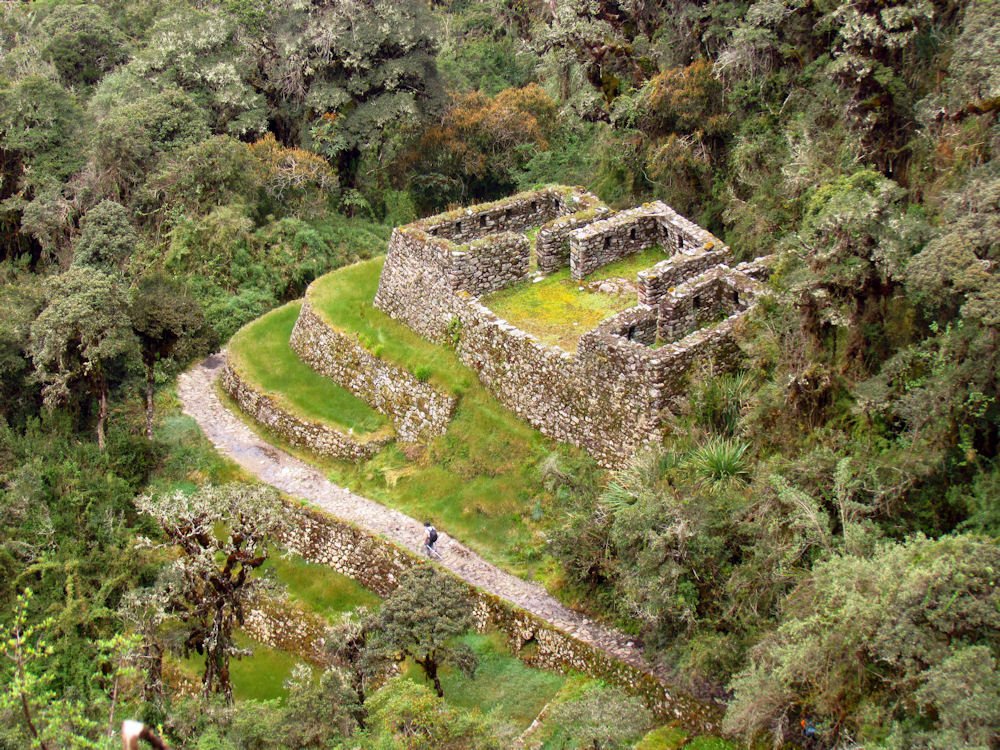
Qunchamarka tambo on Inca Trail to Machu Picchu

The functions of the tambos were dependent on their size as well as the facilities they contained. Every tambo had the capacity to house various state officials. For example, the smallest tambos served as relay stations for the chasquis, who were state messengers who ran along state roads. Larger tambos could provide other functions as well. For example, larger tambos would have larger storehouses that could provide supplies and some lodging for armies on the move. This function should not be allowed to cause confusion between tambos and qullqa, which were only storehouses that armies would resupply from as they passed by. The largest and most luxurious tambos were generally used to lodge the traveling Inca and his entourage (typically wives and state officials).

Beyond taking care of various kinds of travelers, larger tambos would also contain facilities where various specialists, such as potters and weavers, would produce their goods. They could also serve as administrative centers from which local lords would oversee the region. Furthermore, larger tambos would contain ceremonial spaces which would serve as places for religious practices. Additionally, historians have also found evidence of hunting activity, mining activity, and coca production/exploitation at tambo sites.

Pedro Cieza de León made numerous references to the tambos in his Crónicas de Peru; in the following passage, Cieza de León described the general uses for the tambos that he learned from native peoples:

And so there would be adequate supplies for their men, every four leagues there were lodgings and storehouses, and the representatives or stewards who lived in the capital of the provinces took great care to see that the natives kept these inns or lodgings (tambos) well supplied. And so certain of them would not give more than others, and all should make their contribution, they kept the accounts by a method of knots, which they call quipus, and in this way, after the troops had passed by, they could check and see that there had been no fraud.

== Spacing ==
Many historians or scholars state that tambos are generally placed a day's walk from each other. However, as Hyslop points out, there are many factors, both individual and external, that can affect how much one can walk in a day, making this unreliable as a measure of physical distance. In practice, the distances between tambos vary wildly, ranging from fewer than 10 km to nearly 45 km. Many different factors affected the placement of these tambos. In general, the Inca would try to build them near water and favorable terrain, while they would try to avoid unfavorable terrain (such as marshes or steep slopes). In some cases, the Inca would try to build away from local population centers (for reasons unknown), but other times would try to build near local labor sources. Furthermore, tambos placement may have been influenced by the average speed of llama caravans, which would move more slowly than an individual. Another important traveler that would move more slowly than a typical individual would be the Sapa Inka. Since the Sapa Inka would travel with a grand procession, travel would be slower than if he were traveling alone, which would require closer tambo placement.

== Architecture ==
Remains of tambos are scattered throughout modern-day Peru, Bolivia, Chile, and Colombia. The remains of the tambos display a large variety of architectural styles. Although this variation is hard to capture in complete detail, some rough categories can be defined. For example, some tambos were built before the Inca empire existed, and the Inca simply took control of them. Pre-Inca tambo architecture can be divided into 2 basic categories. Some tambos were not modified in any way and therefore feature an architectural style that is distinctly pre-Inca. However, some of these sites were renovated by the Inca, so some pre-Inca sites do feature some Inca architecture.

For the sites built in the Inca period, the architecture styles can be divided into three basic categories. Some tampu were definitively local in their architectural style. This typically happened in places where the local culture was strong and was permitted to continue. Other sites would have mostly Inca architecture, but would have at least some subtle influence from local traditions. Finally, some tambos would contain only Inca style architecture. Because of the strong influence local culture tends to have on these structures, Inca style-only tambos tend to exist more in isolated areas as opposed to areas with large populations.

The kancha was an architectural feature found in many tambos throughout the Inca empire. The kancha consists of a walled rectangular enclosure, which houses a number of smaller one-room structures, facing a courtyard. The decision to build smaller structures within appears to be related to the "cold, rainy environment of the Andean highlands." Hyslop notes that the kancha was the most common Inca structure, ranging from the great Qorikancha in Cusco to the smallest, remotest tambo along the Inca roads system. Thus, kanchas were not only present in tambos, but were present in a variety of Inca buildings. Historians think that kanchas were typically used as living facilities, which reflects the tambos purpose of housing traveling individuals or groups.

== Tambos after the Inca collapse ==
Scholars such as Craig Morris note that, after the collapse of the Inca empire, the people living within the territory of the former empire ceased to use tambos as they had before. From this, Morris suggests that the tambo system was a part of an "artificial urbanism" created by the Inca empire. Thus, tambos had been less useful to the people living throughout the Inca empire than they were to the Incas themselves. Morris supports this argument with statements that tambos were frequently positioned for interregional contact and travel, as opposed to being positioned near large local villages.

Although indigenous Andeans may have stopped using tambos after the fall of the Inca empire, tambos did not go entirely out of use: Spanish colonizers began to make use of the tambo system. Sometimes the Spaniards used the original Inca tambo structures, but the Spaniards also built new structures along roads. Sometimes the Spaniards would build a new tambo along a road that still had a leftover tambo from the Inca empire. Historians know that the Spanish extended the tambo system beyond what existed throughout the Inca empire, increasing the amount of territory covered.

The city of Santiago was built around an indigenous settlement with an irrigation system and a "Tambo Grande". According to archaeologist Rubén Stehberg the Spanish utilized pre-existing buildings and did not built any structure in Santiago until no less than eight months after their arrival to the location.

== See also ==
- Casuchas del Rey
- Chasqui
- Cultural periods of Peru
- Peruvian Ancient Cultures
- Ollantaytambo
- Qullqa
