= Inca road system =

Transportation system of the Inca empire

- Qhapaq Ñan
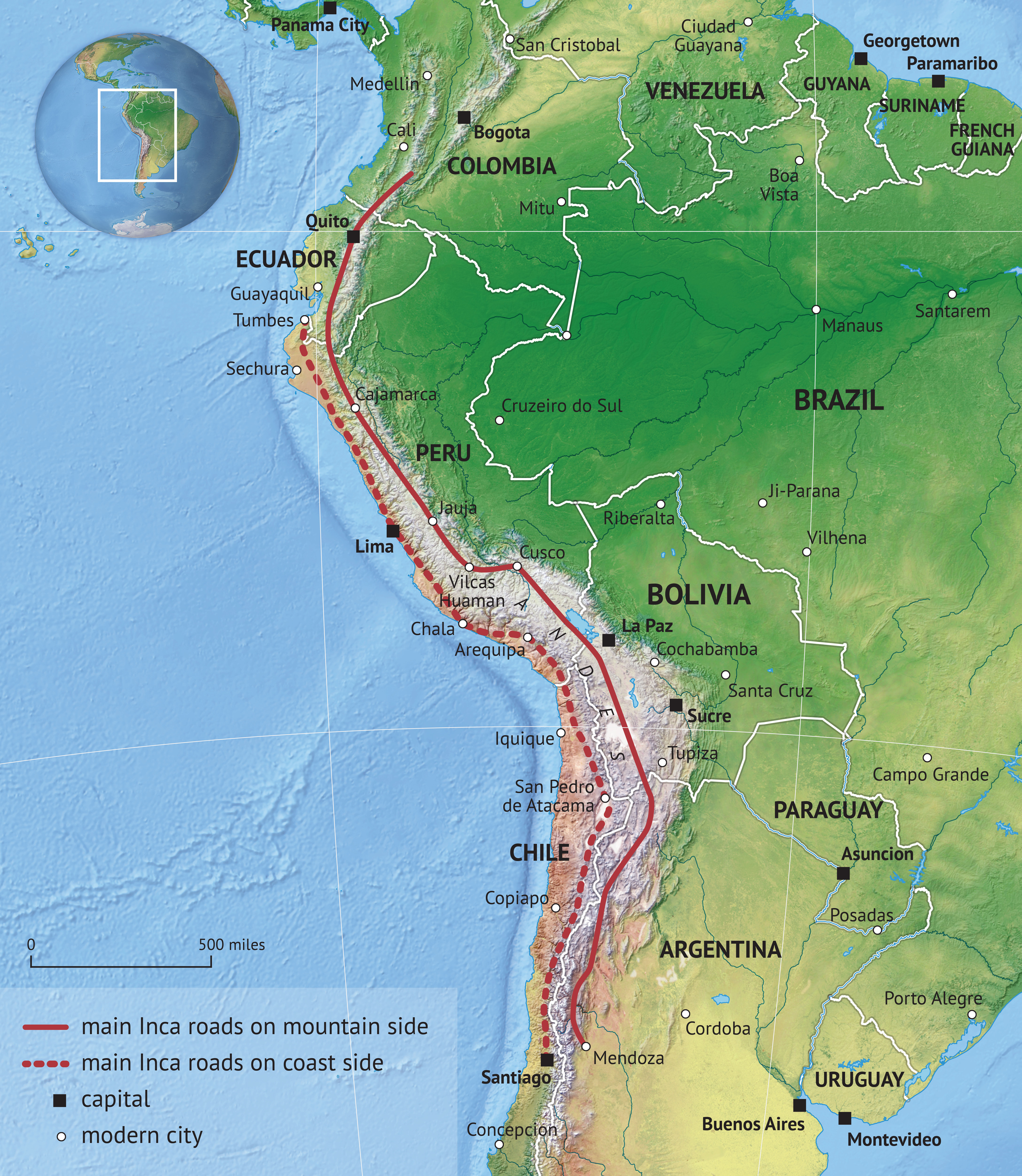
- Extent of the Inca road system

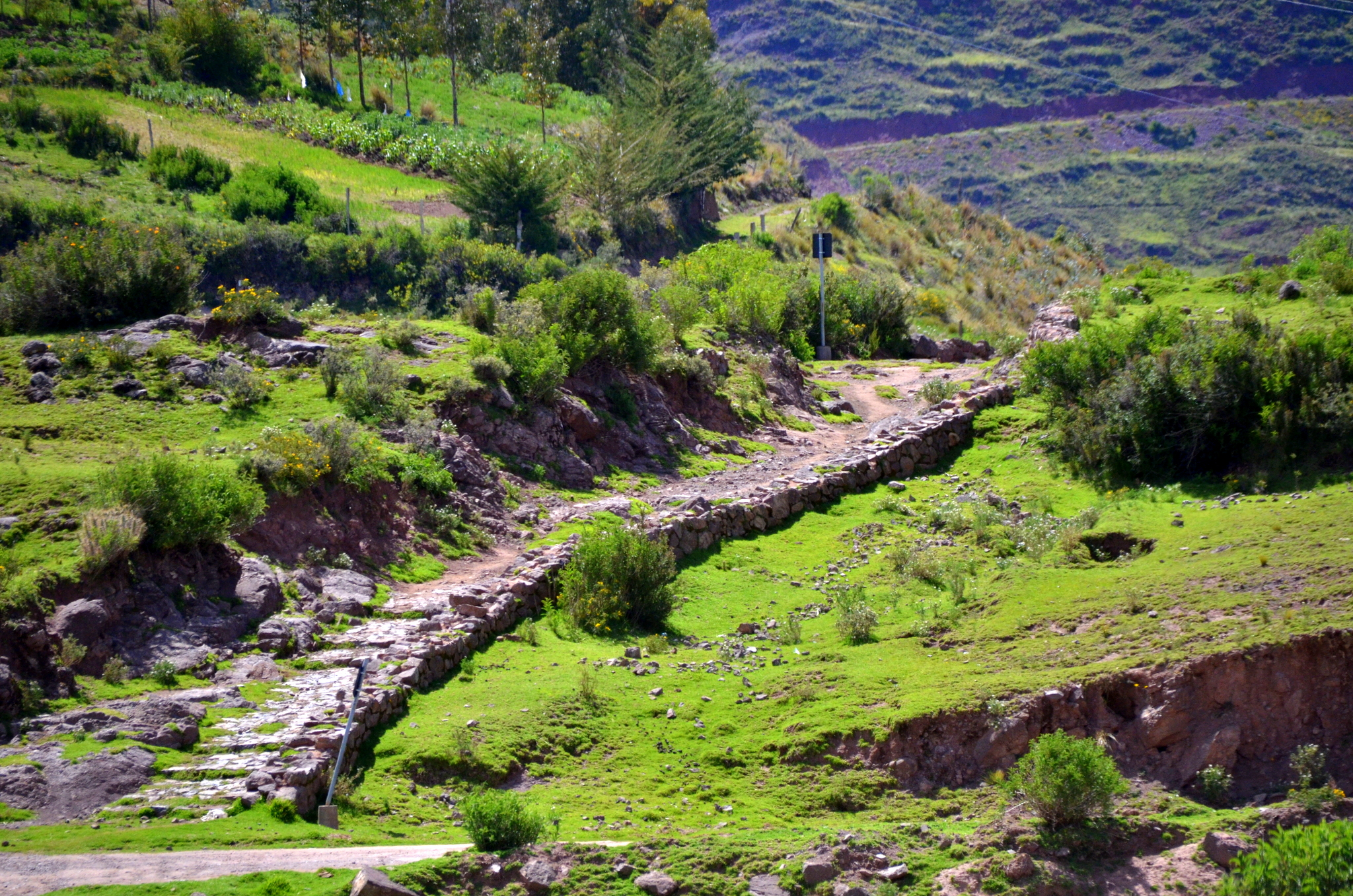
- Section of the Inca road

Route information
- Length: 40,000 km (25,000 mi)
- Time period: Pre-Columbian South America

UNESCO World Heritage Site
- Official name: Qhapaq Ñan, Andean Road System
- Criteria: Cultural: ii, iii, iv, vi
- Reference: 1459
- Inscription: 2014 (38th Session)
- Area: 3,642.8067 ha (9,001.571 acres)
- Buffer zone: 728,448.256 ha (1,800,034.84 acres)

The Inca road system (also spelled Inka road system and in Quechua: Qhapaq Ñan (Note: Qhapaq=rich, powerful, opulent, wealthy, privileged; ñan=road, way, path, route. Source "Diccionario quechua - español - quechua" Gobierno Regional Cusco - Cusco – Second edition, 2005) meaning "royal road") was the most extensive and advanced transportation system in pre-Columbian South America. It was about 40,000 kilometres (25,000 mi) long in total. The construction of the roads required a large expenditure of time and effort.

The network was composed of formal roads carefully planned, engineered, built, marked and maintained; paved where necessary, with stairways to gain elevation, bridges and accessory constructions such as retaining walls, and water drainage systems. It was based on two north–south roads: one along the coast and the second and most important inland and up the mountains, both with numerous branches. It can be directly compared with the road network built during the Roman Empire, although the Inca road system was built one thousand years later. The road system allowed for the transfer of information, goods, soldiers and persons, without the use of wheels, within the Tawantinsuyu or Inca Empire throughout a territory covering almost 2,000,000 km^{2} (770,000 sq mi) and inhabited by about 12 million people.

The roads were bordered, at intervals, with buildings to allow the most effective usage: at short distance there were relay stations for chasquis, the running messengers; at a one-day walking interval tambos allowed support to the road users and flocks of llama pack animals. Administrative centers with warehouses, called qullqas, for re-distribution of goods were found along the roads. Towards the boundaries of the Inca Empire and in newly conquered areas pukaras (fortresses) were found.

Part of the road network was built by cultures that precede the Inca Empire, notably the Wari culture in the northern central Peru and the Tiwanaku culture in Bolivia. Different organizations such as UNESCO and IUCN have been working to protect the network in collaboration with the governments and communities of the six countries (Colombia, Ecuador, Peru, Bolivia, Chile and Argentina) through which the Great Inca Road passes.

In modern times some remnant of the roads see heavy use from tourism, such as the Inca Trail to Machu Picchu, which is well known by trekkers.

A 2021 study found that its effects have lingered for over 500 years, with wages, nutrition and school levels higher in communities living within 20 kilometers of the Inca Road, compared to similar communities farther away.

== Extent ==
I believe that, since the memory of people, it has not been read of such a greatness as this road, made through deep valleys and high peaks, snow covered mountains, marshes of water, live rock and beside furious rivers; in some parts it was flat and paved, on the slopes well made, by the mountains cleared, by the rocks excavated, by the rivers with walls, in the snows with steps and resting places; everywhere it was clean, swept, clear of debris, full of dwellings, warehouses for valuable goods, temples of the Sun, relay stations that were on this road.

— Pedro Cieza de León
El Señorío del Inca. 1553

Road system of the Inca Empire

The Tawantinsuyu, which integrated the current territories of Peru, continued towards the north through present-day Ecuador, reaching the northernmost limits of the Andean mountain range in the region of Los Pastos in Colombia; by the South, it penetrated down to the Mendoza and Atacama lands, in the southernmost reaches of the Empire, corresponding currently with Argentine and Chilean territories. On the Chilean side, the road reached the Maipo river. The Inca Road system connected the northern territories with the capital city Cusco and the southern territories. About 5,000 kilometres (3,100 mi), out of the more than 7,000 kilometres (4,300 mi) that the Andean mountains span, were covered by it.

As indicated by Hyslop, "The main route of the sierra (mountains) that passes through Quito, Tumebamba, Huánuco, Cusco, Chucuito, Paria and Chicona to the Mendoza River, has a length of 5,658 km." (3,516 miles)

The exact extent of the road network is not known: travelers and scholars proposed various lengths, spanning from 23,000 kilometres (14,000 mi) to 40,000 kilometres (25,000 mi) to 60,000 kilometres (37,000 mi). Two main routes were defined: the eastern one, inland, runs high in the puna grassland, a large and undulating surface, which extends above 4,000 metres (13,000 ft); the second one, the western route, that starts from the region of Tumbes in the current Peru–Ecuador border, follows the coastal plains, but does not include the coastal deserts, where it hugs the foothills. This western road outlines the current Pan-American Highway in its South American pacific extension.

Recent investigations carried out under the Proyecto Qhapaq Ñan, sponsored by the Peruvian government and basing also on previous research and surveys, suggest with a high degree of probability that another branch of the road system existed on the east side of the Andean ridge, connecting the administrative centre of Huánuco Pampa with the Amazonian provinces and having a length of about 470 kilometres (290 mi).

More than twenty transversal routes ran over the western mountains, while others traversed the eastern cordillera in the mountains and lowlands, connecting the two main routes and populated areas, administrative centres, agricultural and mining zones, as well as ceremonial centres and sacred spaces in different parts of the vast Inca territory. Some of these roads reach altitudes of over 5,000 metres (16,000 ft) above sea level.

=== The four routes ===
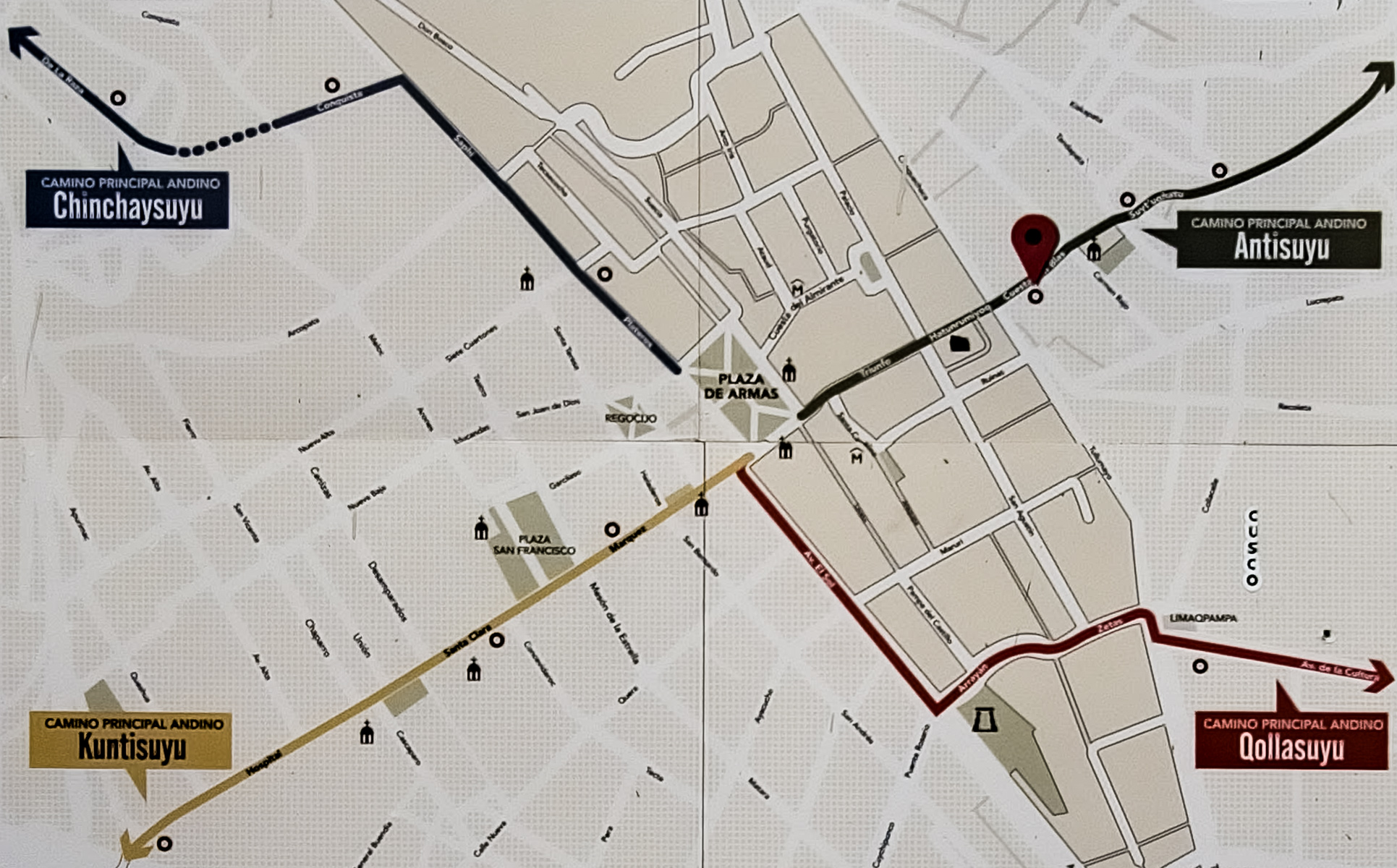
Roads starting from the Plaza de Armas of Cusco

During the Inca Empire, the roads officially stemmed from Cusco into the 4 cardinal directions towards the 4 suyus (provinces) into which the Tawantinsuyu was divided. Cusco was the center of Peru: the Inca-Spanish chronicler Inca Garcilaso de la Vega states that "Cozco in the language of the Incas means navel that is the Earth's navel". The four regions were named Chinchaysuyu towards the North, Collasuysu towards the South, Antisuyu towards the East and the lower valleys of the Amazon region and Contisuyu towards the West and the lower valleys along the Pacific coast.

The route towards the North was the most important in the Inca Empire, as shown by its constructive characteristics: a width ranging between 3 and 16 m and the size of the archaeological vestiges that mark the way both in its vicinity and in its area of influence. It is not coincidental that this path goes through and organizes the most important administrative centers of the Tawantinsuyu outside Cusco, such as Vilcashuamán, Xauxa, Tarmatambo, Pumpu, Huánuco Pampa, Cajamarca and Huancabamba, in current territories of Peru; and Ingapirca, Tomebamba or Riobamba in Ecuador. This was regarded by the Incas as "the" Qhapaq Ñan, main road or royal road, starting from Cusco and arriving in Quito. From Quito northwards, the Inca presence is perceived in defensive settlements that mark the advance of the Empire by the Ecuadorian provinces of Carchi and Imbabura and the current Nariño Department in Colombia, which in the 16th century was in process of being incorporated into the Inca Empire.

The route of Qollasuyu leaves Cusco and points towards the South, splitting into two branches to skirt Lake Titicaca (one on the east and one the west coast) that join again to cross the territory of the Bolivian Altiplano. From there the roads were unfolding to advance towards the southernmost boundaries of the Tawantinsuyu. One branch headed towards the current Mendoza region of Argentina, while the other penetrated the ancient territories of the Diaguita and Atacama people in Chilean lands, who had already developed basic road networks. From there, crossing the driest desert in the world, the Atacama Desert, the Qollasuyu route reached the Maipo river, currently in the Santiago metropolitan region. From there no vestiges of the Inca advance have been found.

Contisuyu roads allowed to connect Cusco to coastal territories, in what corresponds to the current regions of Arequipa, Moquegua and Tacna, in the extreme Peruvian south. These roads are transversal routes that guaranteed the complementarity of natural resources, since they cross very varied ecological floors, in the varied altitude of the descent from the heights of the cordillera to the coastal spaces.

The roads of the Antisuyu are the least known and a lesser number of vestiges were registered. They penetrated into the territories of the Ceja de Jungla or Amazonian Andes leading to the Amazon rainforest, where conditions are more difficult for the conservation of archaeological evidences. The true physical extension of the Inca Empire for this region is not very clear.

== Purposes of the road ==
The Incas used the road system for a variety of reasons, from transportation for people who were traveling through the Empire to military and religious purposes. The road system allowed for a fast movement of persons from one part of the Empire to the other: both armies and workers used the roads to move and the tambos to rest and be fed. It also allowed for the fast movement of information and valuable small goods which traveled through the chasquis. The Incas gave priority to the straightness of the roads, whenever possible, to shorten the distances.

According to Hyslop the roads were the basis for the expansion of the Inca Empire: the most important settlements were located on the main roads, following a provision prefigured by the existence of older roads. The Incas had a predilection for the use of the Altiplano, or puna areas, for displacement, seeking to avoid contact with the populations settled in the valleys, and project, at the same time, a straight route of rapid communication. Other researchers pointed out additional factors that conditioned the location of Inca settlements and roads, such as the establishment of control zones in an intermediate location with respect to the populations and productive lands of the valleys, the requirement of specific goods, and storage needs, which were favored in the high plains of the Altiplano, characterized by low temperatures and dry climates. As an example, the administrative center of Huánuco Pampa includes 497 collcas, which totaled as much as 37,100 cubic metres (1,310,000 cu ft) and could support a population of between twelve and fifteen thousand people. Cotapachi (nowadays in the Bolivian region of Cochabamba) included a group of 2,400 collcas far away from any significant village. Collcas were long-term storage houses, primarily for the storage of grains and maize, which had an extremely long expiration date and made them ideal for long-term storage for the army in the event of conflicts.

According to Hyslop the use of the Inca road system was reserved to authorities. He states: «soldiers, porters, and llama caravans were prime users, as were the nobility and other individuals on official duty… Other subjects were allowed to walk along the roads only with permission…» Nevertheless, he recognizes that «there was also an undetermined amount of private traffic … about which little is known». Some local structures (called ranchillos) exist alongside the road which may allow to infer that also private trade traffic was present.

The use of the Inca roads, in the colonial period, after the Spanish conquest of Peru was mostly discontinued. The Conquistadors used the Inca roads to approach the capital city of Cusco, but they used horses and ox carts, which were not usable on such a road, and soon most of the roads were abandoned. Only about 25 percent of this network is still visible today, the rest having been destroyed by wars (conquest, uprising, independence or between nations), the change in the economic model which involved abandoning large areas of territory, and finally the construction of modern infrastructure, during the nineteenth and twentieth centuries, which led to the superposition of new communication channels in the outline of pre-Hispanic roads.

=== Transportation ===
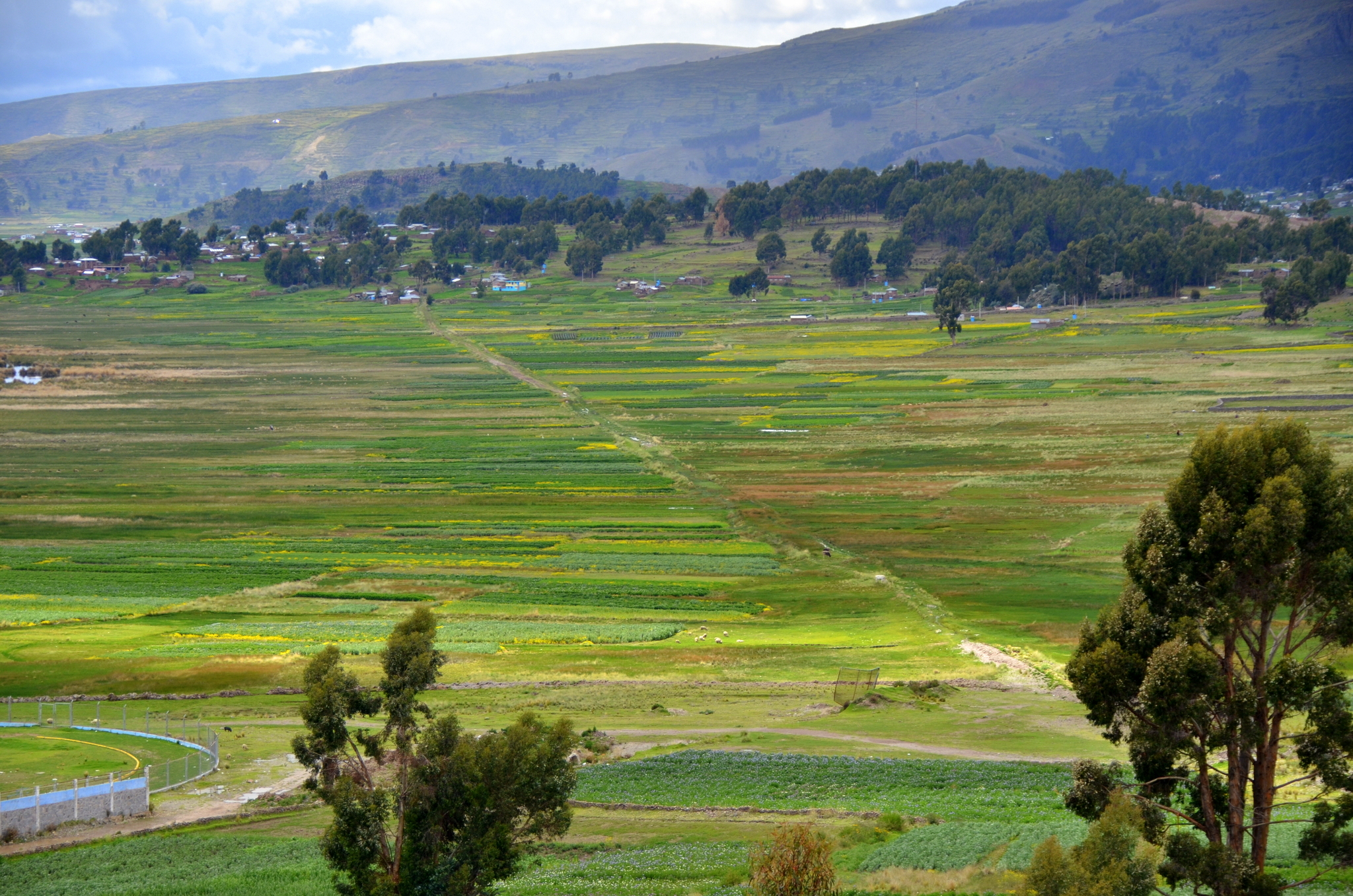
The Inca road bordering the Titicaca lake seen from the mirador of Chucuito, Peru.

Transportation was done on foot as in pre-Columbian America; the use of wheels for transportation was not known. The Inca had two main uses of transportation on the roads: the chasqui (runners) for relaying information (through the quipus) and lightweight valuables throughout the empire, and llamas caravans for transporting goods.

Llamas (Note: Although very similar to llamas, alpacas are not pack animals.) were used as pack animals in large flocks. They are lightweight animals and cannot carry much but are incredibly nimble. To transport large numbers of goods across the empire, it was more efficient for the Incas to use herds of llamas and to have two or three herdsmen. Herdsmen would drive the animals carrying their loads up the steep mountain roads, increasing carrying capacity without risking additional lives. Llamas have soft, padded hoofs, which give them good traction and a negligible impact on the road surface. Llamas of the Q'ara race (short-haired variety), which are used also in contemporary caravans, can carry about 30 kilograms (66 lb) for a distance of 20 kilometres (12 mi) per day, when necessary they can carry up to 45 kilograms (99 lb) for short trips. They forage on natural vegetation.

=== Trade ===
Roads and bridges were essential to the political cohesion of the Inca state and to the redistribution of goods within it. All resources in the Empire were the property of the ruling elite. Commercial exchanges between manufacturers or producers and buyers were not practiced, as the management of all goods came under the control of the central authority. The redistribution of goods was known as the vertical archipelago: this system formed the basis for trade throughout the Inca Empire. As different sections of the Empire had different resources, the roads were used to distribute goods to other parts of the Empire that were in need of them. Roads reinforced the strength of the Inca Empire, as they allowed for the empire's multitude of resources to be distributed through a set system to ensure all parts of the Empire were satisfied. Nevertheless, scholars have noted that there was a possible barter of goods along the roads between caravanners and villagers: a sort of "secondary exchange" and "daily swapping".

=== Military ===
These roads provided easy, reliable and quick routes for the Empire's administrative and military communications, personnel movement, and logistical support. After conquering a territory or convincing the local lord to become an ally, the Inca would employ a military-political strategy including the extension of the road system into the new dominated territories. The Qhapaq Ñan thus became a permanent symbol of the ideological presence of the Inca dominion in the newly conquered place. The road system facilitated the movement of imperial troops and preparations for new conquests as well as the quelling of uprisings and rebellions. However it was also allowed for sharing with the newly incorporated populations the surplus goods that the Inca produced and stored annually for the purpose of redistribution. The army moved frequently, mostly in support of military actions but also to support civil works. The forts or pukaras were located mainly in the border areas, as a spatial indicator of the process of progressing and annexing new territories to the Empire. In fact, a greater number of pukaras are found towards the north of the Tawantinsuyu, as witnesses to the work of incorporating the northern territories, which were known to be rich in pastures. To the south there are abundant remains, around Mendoza in Argentina and along the Maipo river in Chile, where the presence of forts marks the line of the road at the southernmost point of the Empire. (Note: Out of about 200 known pukaras 100 of them are found in Northern Ecuador and 30 of them in Northern Chile and Argentina. See Anderson, Amber M., "War and Conquest: Inca strategies and struggles in Northern Ecuador", https://www.academia.edu/11358577/War_and_Conquest_Inca_strategies_and_struggles_in_Northern_Ecuador, accessed 27 May 2017)

=== Religious ===
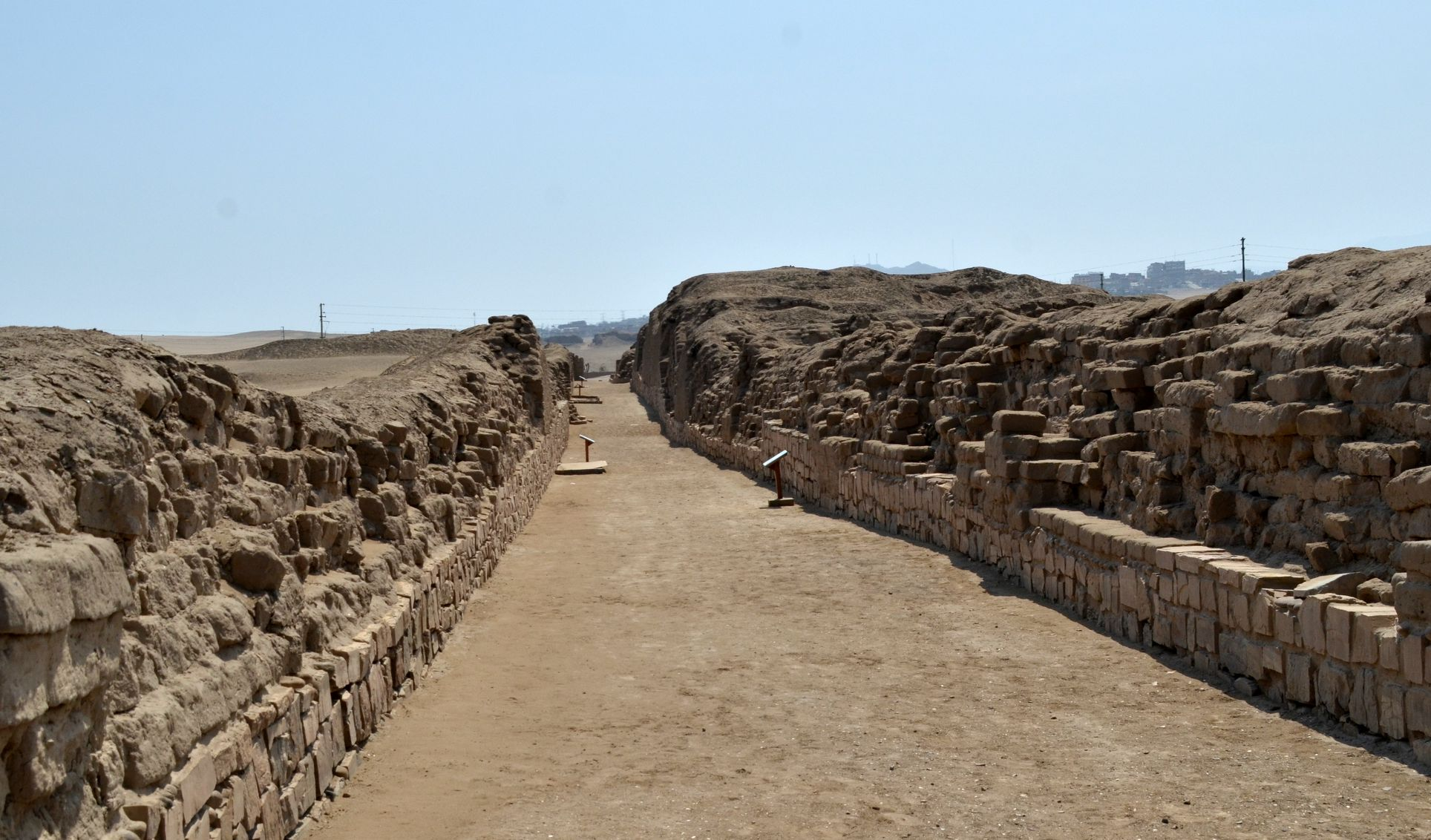
The Inca coastal road at the Pachacamac Sanctuary

The high altitude shrines were directly related to the cult of Nature and specifically to the mountains, typical of the Inca society, which the Incas formalized by the construction of religious structures on the mountain peaks. Mountains are the apus, or deities, in the universe of Andean beliefs that are still held today; they have a spiritual connotation linked to the future of Nature and human existence. The Incas held many rituals, including the sacrifice of children, goods, and llamas, at the mountain tops as part of this belief. However, not all mountains held the same religious connotation nor were sanctuaries built on all of them. The only way to reach the summits of the mountains for worship was by connecting the road system to high altitude paths in order to reach the sacred places. They were ritual roads that culminated in the peaks, at the point of contact between the earthly and the sacred space. Some of them reached high altitudes above sea level, such as mount Chañi, which had a road that started at the base and went to the summit at an elevation of 5,949 metres (19,518 ft).

In addition to high altitude shrines, there were also many holy shrines or religious sites, called wak’a, that were a part of the Zeq’e system along and near the roads, especially around the capital city, Cusco. These shrines were either natural or modified features of the landscape, as well as buildings, where the Inca would visit for worship.

Some important places of worship were directly connected by the main Inca roads. Such is the case of the sanctuary of Pachacamac through which the coastal road passed, just south of present day Lima.

== History ==
=== Inca Empire era ===

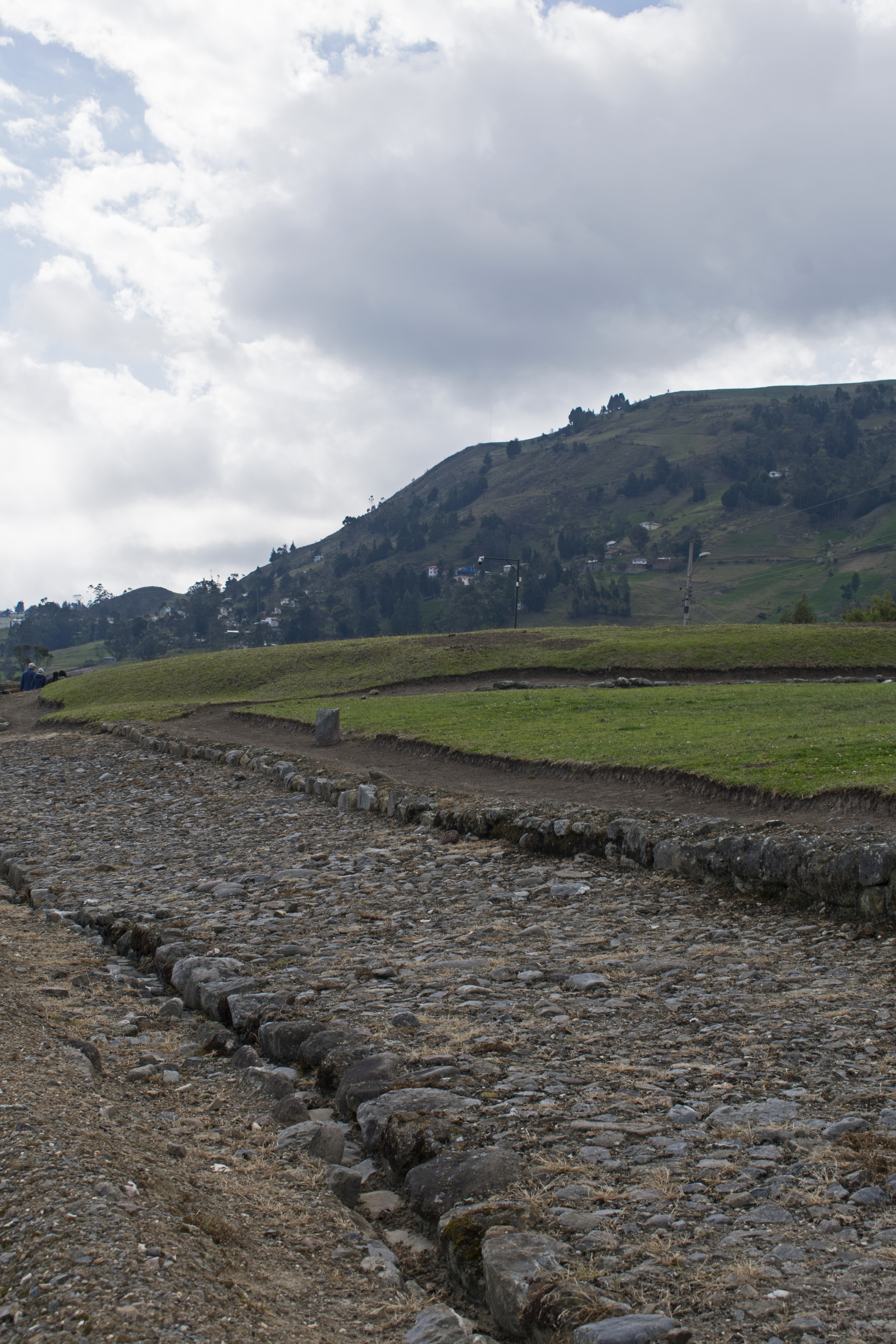
A preserved segment of Inca road in Ingapirca, Ecuador

Much of the system was the result of the Incas claiming exclusive right over numerous traditional routes, some of which had been constructed centuries earlier, mostly by the Wari empire in the central highlands of Peru and the Tiwanaku culture. This latter had developed around Lake Titicaca, in the current territories of Peru and Bolivia, between the 6th and 12th centuries CE, and had set up a complex and advanced civilization. Many new sections of the road were built or upgraded substantially by the Incas: the one through Chile's Atacama desert and the one along the western margin of Lake Titicaca serve as two examples.

The reign of the Incas originated during the Late Intermediate period (between 1000 CE and 1450 CE), when this group dominated only the region of Cusco. Inca Pachakutiq began the transformation and expansion of what decades later would become the Tawantinsuyu. The historical stage of the Empire begun around 1438 when, having settled the disputes with local populations around Cusco, the Incas started the conquest of the coastal valleys from Nasca to Pachacamac and the other regions of Chinchaysuyu. Their strategy involved modifying or constructing a road structure that would ensure the connection of the incorporated territory with Cusco and with other administrative centers, allowing the displacement of troops and officials. The Incas' military advance was based mostly on diplomatic deals before the annexation of the new regions and the consolidation of the dominion, considering war as a last resort. The foundation of cities and administrative centers connected by the road system ensured state control of the new incorporated ethnic groups. Topa Inca Yupanqui succeeded to Pachakutiq, and conquered the Chimu reaching the far north region of Quito around 1463; later he extended the conquests to the jungle region of Charcas and, in the south, to Chile.

Spanish conquerors used the road in their conquests, for example Diego de Almagro's expedition to Chile went largely along the road that led from Cuzco to Paria and Tupiza and then further south.

=== Colonial era ===
During the first years of the Colony, the Qhapaq Ñan suffered a stage of abandonment and destruction caused by the abrupt decrease of the number of natives due to illness and war which reduced the population from more than 12 million people to about 1.1 million in 50 years and destroyed the social structure that provided labor for road maintenance. The use of the Inca roads became partial and was adapted to the new political and economic targets of the Colony and later of the Viceroyalty where the economic structure was based on the extraction of minerals and commercial production. This implied a dramatic change in the use of the territory. The former integration of longitudinal and transversal territories was reduced to a connection of the Andean valleys and the Altiplano with the coast to allow for the export of products, especially gold and silver, which started flowing to the coast and from there to Spain. A key factor in the dismantling of the network at the subcontinental level was the opening of new routes to connect the emerging production centers (estates and mines) with the coastal ports. In this context, only those routes that covered the new needs were used, abandoning the rest, particularly those that connected to the forts built during the advance of the Inca Empire or those that linked the agricultural spaces with the administrative centres. Nevertheless, the ritual roads that allowed access to the sanctuaries continued to be used under the religious syncretism that has been characterizing the Andean historical moments since the conquest.

Cieza de Leon in 1553 noted the abandonment of the road and stated that although in many places it is already broken down and undone, it shows the great thing that it was. The admiration of the chroniclers was not enough to convince the Spanish ruler of the need to maintain and consolidate the road system rather than abandoning and destroying it. The reduction of the local population to newly built settlements (known as reducciones, a sort of concentration camps) was among the causes of the abandonment of the Inca roads and the building of new ones to connect the reducciones to the centers of Spanish power. Another important factor was the inadequacy of the road for horses and mules introduced by the conquerors, that became the new pack animals, substituting for the lightweight llamas.

Even the new agriculture, derived from Spain, consisting mainly of cereals, changed the appearance of the territory, which was sometimes transformed, cutting and joining several andenes (farming terraces), which in turn reduced the fertile soil due to erosion from rain. The pre-Hispanic agricultural technologies were abandoned or displaced towards marginal spaces, relegated by the colonizers.

Part of the network continued to be used, as well as some of its equipment, such as the tambos, which were transformed into stores and shops, adjusting to the tradition of Spain, where peasant production was taken to them for selling. The tambos entered a new stage as meeting spaces for different ways of life that irremediably ended up integrating new social and territorial structures.

=== Post-colonial and modern times ===
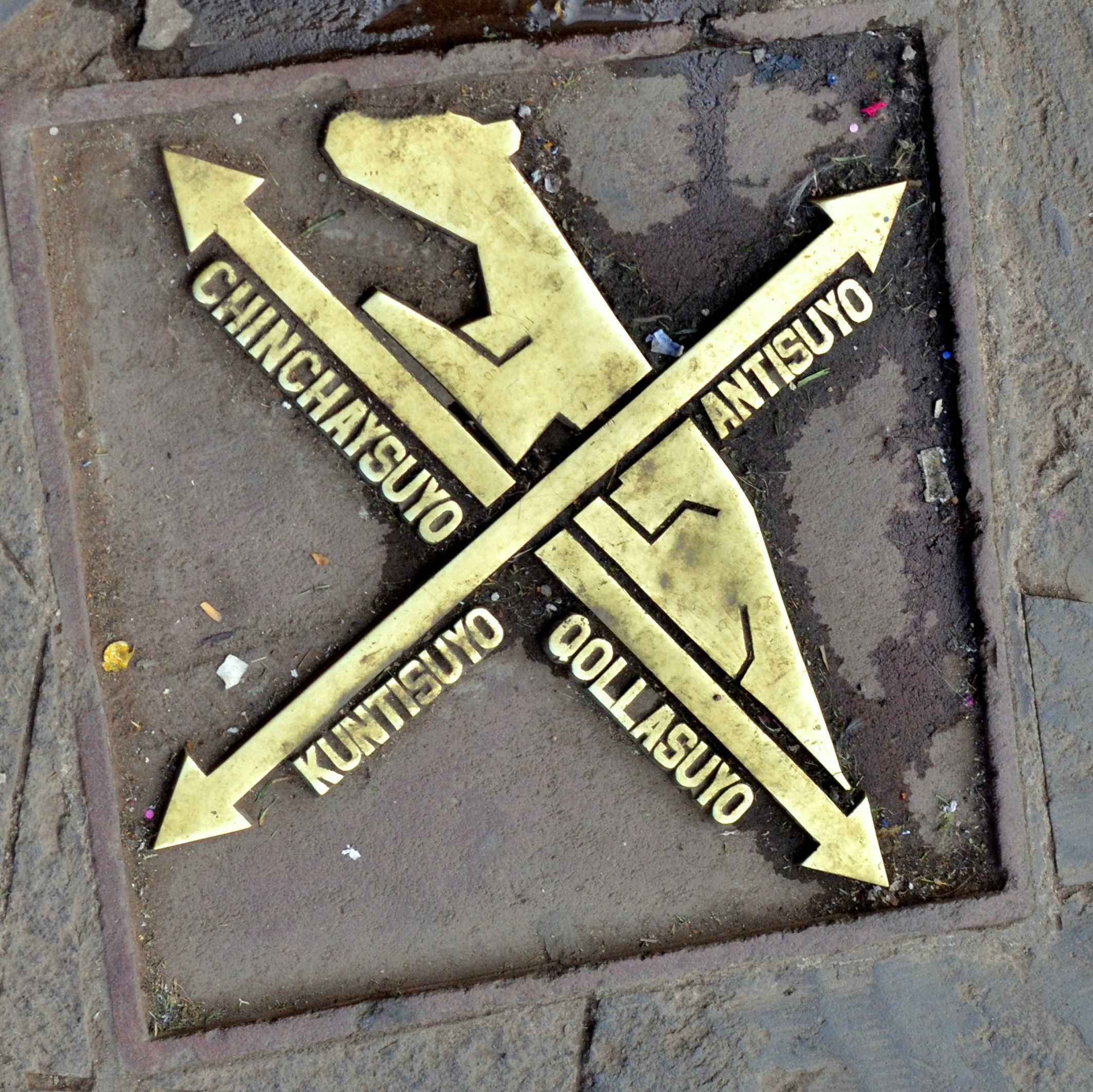
Cusco, Peru - plaque indicating the 4 directions of the 4 regions (suyus) of the Inca Empire

After the independence from Spain the American republics, throughout the 19th century, did not provide significant changes to the territory. In the case of Peru, the territorial structure established by the Colony was maintained while the link between the production of the mountains and the coast was consolidated under a logic of extraction and export.

The construction of modern roads and railways was adapted to this logic. It gave priority to the communication with the coasts and was complemented by transversal axes of penetration into the inter-Andean valleys for the channeling of production towards the coastal axis and its seaports. At the end of the eighteenth century, large estates were developed for the supply of raw materials to international markets, together with guano, so the maritime ports of Peru took on special relevance and intense activity requiring an adequate accessibility from the production spaces. Some parts of the Inca roads were still in use in the south of the Altiplano giving access to the main centers for the production of alpaca and vicuña wools, which were in high demand in the international markets.

The twentieth century organization of roads along the Andes gave priority to the Pan-American highway along the coast, following roughly the traces of the coastal Inca road. This highway was then connected to west–east routes into the valleys while the north–south Inca road up the mountains was mostly reduced to local pedestrian transit.

In 2014 the road system became a UNESCO World Heritage Site.

== Architecture and engineering of the Inca roads ==
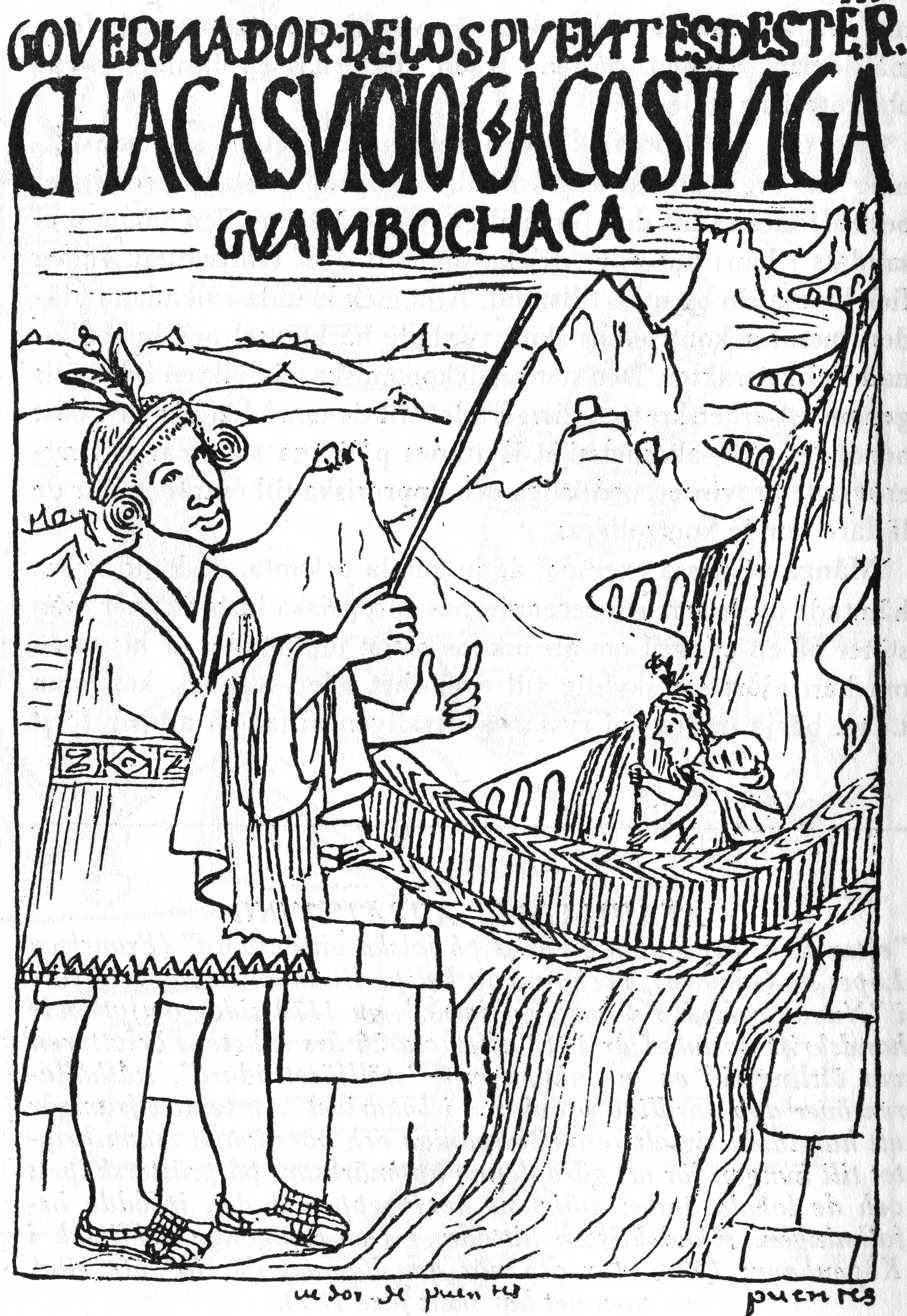
Manager of the Inca bridges

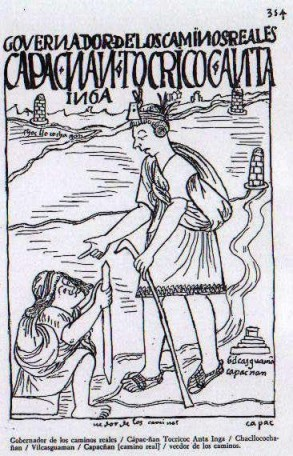
Manager of the royal roads

The Incas built their road system by expanding and reinforcing several pre-existing smaller networks of roads, adapting and improving previous infrastructures, setting up a system of formal roads and providing a maintenance system that would protect the roads and facilitate the displacements and the exchange of people, goods and information. The outcome was a great road network of subcontinental dimensions, which, from Cusco, was directed in the four cardinal directions that marked the territorial division of Tawantinsuyu, which allowed the Inca and his officers to have knowledge of everything that circulated on the roads, however far away they were.

The Incas developed techniques to overcome the difficult territory of the Andes: on steep slopes they built stone steps, while in desert areas near the coast they built low walls to keep the sand from drifting over the road.

=== Construction and maintenance ===
The manpower required for both construction and maintenance was obtained through the mita: a sort of tax work, provided to the state by the conquered people, by which the Inca Empire produced the required goods and performed the necessary services, which included the upkeep of roads and their relevant infrastructures (bridges, tambos, warehouses, etc.).

The labor was organized by officials who were in charge of the development, control and operation of roads and bridges, as well as communications. The chronicler Felipe Guaman Poma de Ayala noted that these authorities were chosen among the noble relatives of the Inca, residents of Cusco. There were three main officials: the manager of the royal roads, the manager of bridges, the manager of chasquis. There were also several amojonadores or builders of landmarks.

=== Architectural components ===
Hyslop noted that there was no road construction standard, because the roads were set in such varied environments and landscapes.

==== Roadway and pavement ====
In the mountains and the high forests, precisely arranged paving stones or cobbles were used for paving, placing them with their flat face towards the top, trying to produce a uniform surface. Nevertheless, not all the roads were paved; in the Andean puna and in the coastal deserts the road was usually made using packed earth, sand, or simply covering grassland with soil or sand. There is also evidence of paving with vegetable fibers such as in the road of Pampa Afuera in Casma (Áncash department, Peru).

The width of the roadway varied between 1 and 4 metres (3.3 and 13.1 ft), although some could be much wider, such as the 25 metres (82 ft) road leading to Huánuco Pampa. The Cusco to Quito portion of the Road system, which was the most trafficked one, had a width always exceeding 4 metres (13 ft) even in agricultural areas where the land had high value. Some portions reached a width of 16 metres (52 ft). Near urban and administrative centers there is evidence of two or three roads constructed in parallel. The maximum recorded width on the north coastal road is 35 metres (115 ft), while the average width in the south coastal road is 8.5 metres (28 ft).

==== Side walls and stone rows ====
Stones and walls served to mark the width of the road and signal it. On the coast and in the mountains, the availability of construction materials such as stone and mud for preparing adobes allowed to build walls on both sides of the road, to isolate it from agricultural land so that the walkers and caravans traveled without affecting the crops. In the flatlands and in the deserts, these walls most probably prevented sand from covering the road. In the absence of walls, the roads in the more deserted areas also used stone rows and wooden poles driven into the sand as route markers. Stone rows were built with stones of similar sizes and shapes, placed next to each other and located on one or both edges of the road, arranged in a sort of curb. In some cases it has been observed that the sides of these stones were edged.

==== Furrows ====
Although it is not strictly a construction element used to delimit the edges of the road, there are cases in which furrows delimit the road on both sides. Examples of these furrows have been found in the coastal area located south of the Chala district in Arequipa.

==== Retaining walls ====
Retaining walls were made with stones, adobes or mud and were built on the hillsides. These walls contained leveling fillings to form the platform of the road or to support the soil that could otherwise slide down the slope, as is generally seen in the transversal roads that lead to the coast from the mountains.

==== Drainage ====
Drainage by ditches or culverts was more frequent in the mountains and jungle due to the constant rainfall. Along other road sections, the drainage of rain water was carried out through an articulated system based on longitudinal channels and shorter drains, transverse to the axis of the road. Retaining walls were used along the mountain slopes, and are similar to those used to support the terraces. When crossing wetlands, roads were often supported by buttress walls or built on causeways.

==== Road marks ====
At given distances the direction of the road was marked with stone piles (mojones in Spanish) a sort of milestones, generally placed on both sides of the road. They were columns of well piled stones with a surmounting stone and often strategically placed on rises in order to be spotted from long distances.

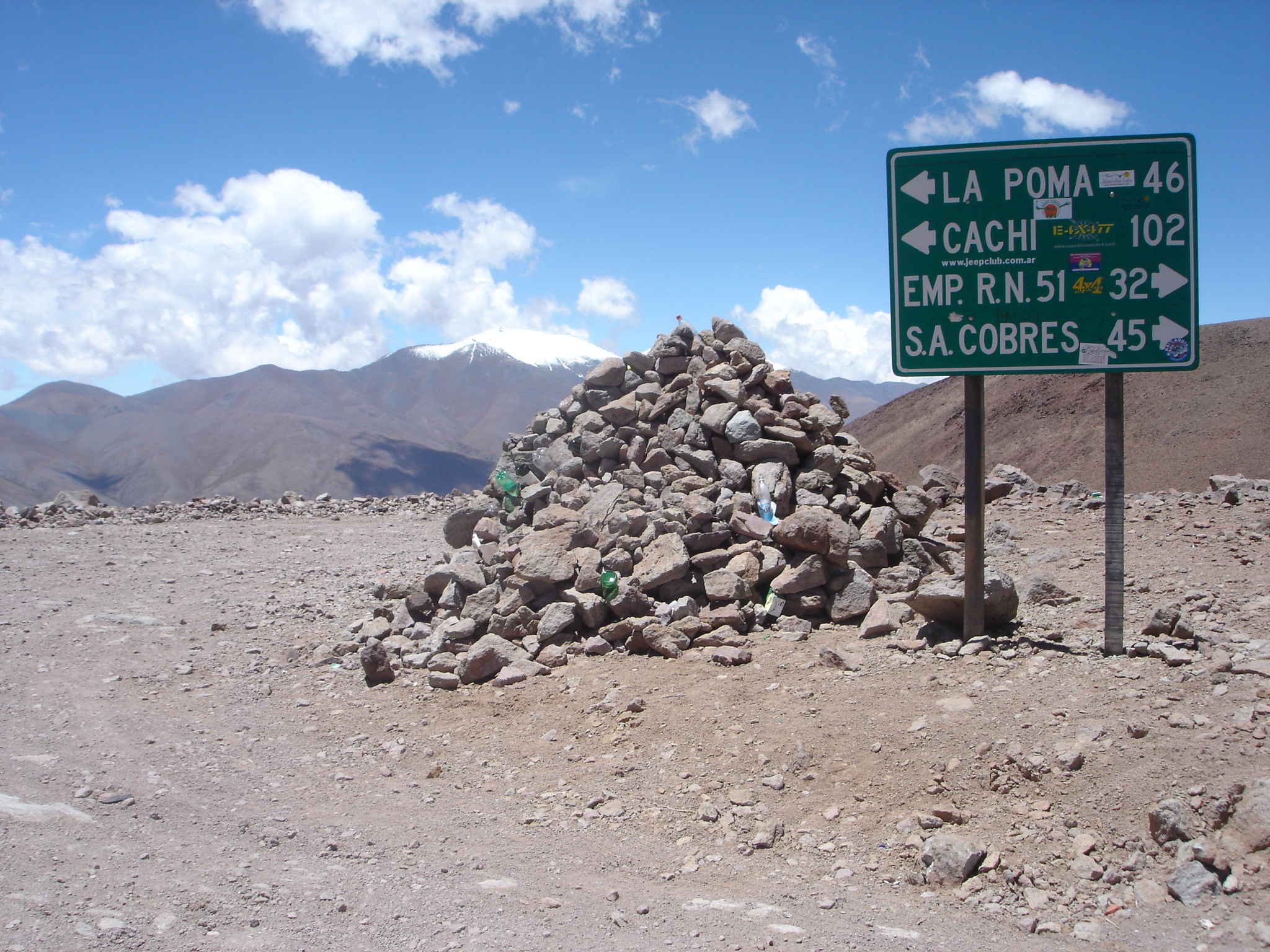
An apacheta in the southern part of the Inca road system in the current province of Salta, Argentina

The apachetas (South American cairns) were mounds of stones of different sizes, formed through gradual accumulation by the travelers, who deposited stones as an offering to preserve their travel from setbacks and allow for its successful conclusion. The apachetas were located on the side of the roads in transitional spaces such as passes or "points of interest" for travellers. This practice was condemned for its pagan character during the Colony and the Viceroyalty, when priests were ordered to dismantle them and plant crosses instead. Nevertheless, the tradition of making apachetas was not discontinued and crosses or altars of different sizes were accompanied by mounds of stone.

==== Paintings and mock-ups ====
Some places such as rock shelters or cliffs show rock paintings next to the roads, which can be interpreted as a reinforcement of the signalization. The generally zoomorphic painted representations correspond to stylized camelids, in the typical Inca design and color. Figures directly carved on the stone are also found.

Rocks of varying sizes at the roadside can represent the shapes of the mountains or important glaciers of the region, as an expression of the sacralization of geography; they can be made up of one or more rocks.

=== Causeways ===
In damp areas embankments were built to produce causeways, in rocky terrain it was necessary to dig the path in the rock or to drive it through an artificial terrace with retaining walls Some important causeways such as on the coast of Lake Titicaca were built to take into account the periodic variation of the lake level due to alternating rainy and dry seasons. They had stone bridges to allow the free flow of water below them.

=== Stairways ===
In order to overcome the limitations imposed by the roughness of the relief and the adverse environmental conditions, the Inca engineers designed different solutions. On rocky outcrops the road became narrower, adapting to the orography with frequent turns and retaining walls, but on particularly steep slopes flights of stairs or ramps were built or carved in the rock.

=== Bridges ===
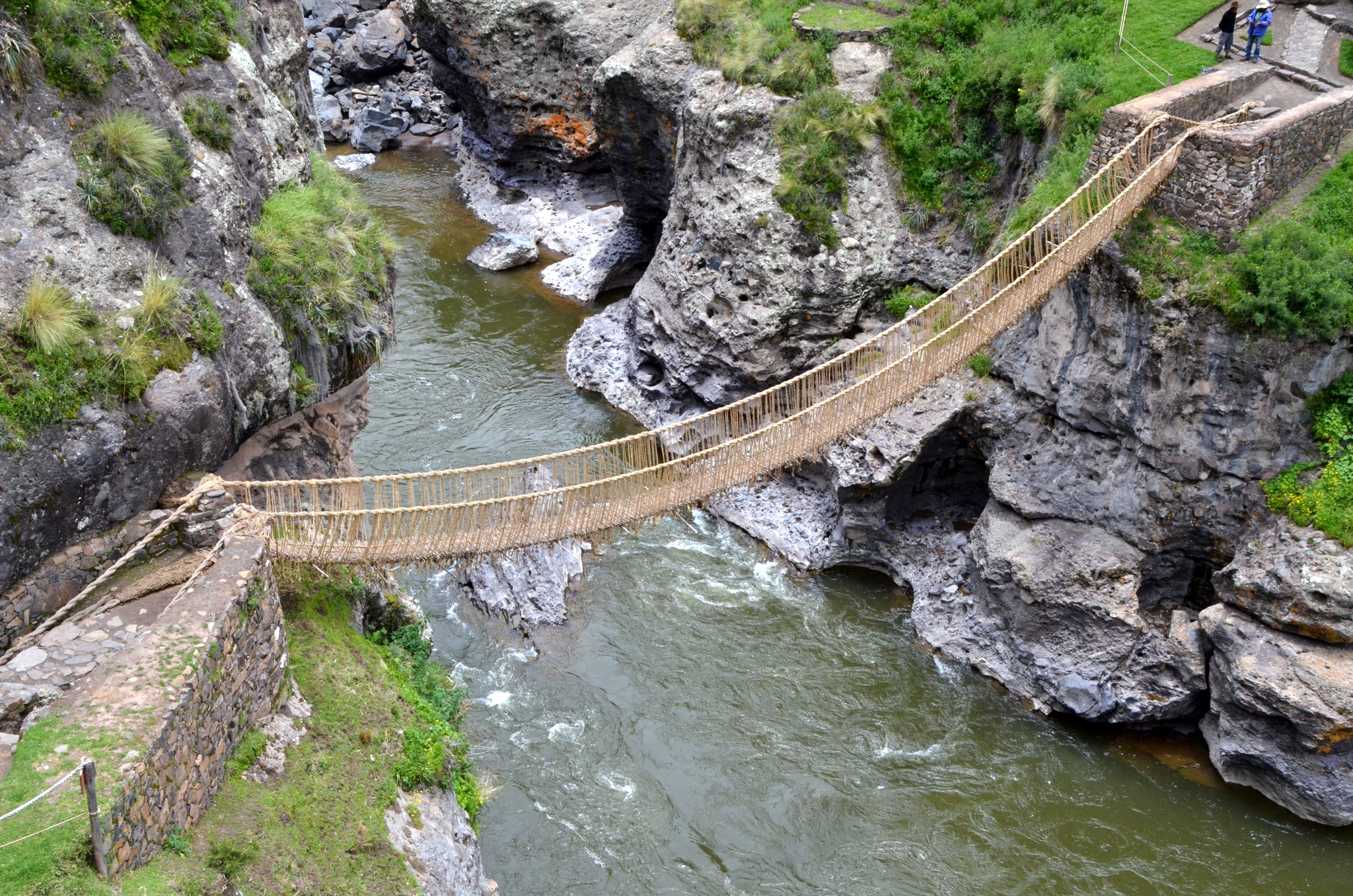
A typical example of an Inca suspension (catenary) bridge on the Apurimac River near Huinchiri, Peru

There were multiple types of bridges used throughout the road system and they were sometimes built in pairs. Some bridges were made of parallel logs tied together with ropes and covered with earth and vegetal fibers supported by stone abutments, while others were built of stone slabs resting on piled stones. One of the difficulties of creating wooden bridges was obtaining logs. Sometimes, the laborers who were making the bridges had to bring the lumber from very far away. Wooden bridges would be replaced about every eight years.

The construction of bridges was accomplished by the help of many workers. It implied first of all the constructions of abutments, normally made of stone both rough and dressed. The masonry could even be extremely well fitted, with no evidence of any mortar being used to keep the stones in place. Incas, having no iron, used a method of stone working which used simple tools, such as hammerstones, to pound the rocks in a way that the contours of the upper rock matched those of the rock below so that the seams fit perfectly without mortar. For simple log bridges, the construction was done by placing a series of logs over projecting canes. Stone bridges could span shorter lengths and needed shallower rivers to be built . Some slabs were placed over the abutments and intermediate stone pillars when necessary. A very special stone bridge was recently discovered in Bolivia consisting of a relatively small opening to allow the stream to flow and a quite imposing stone embankment filling the valley sides in order to allow the road to pass on top of it.

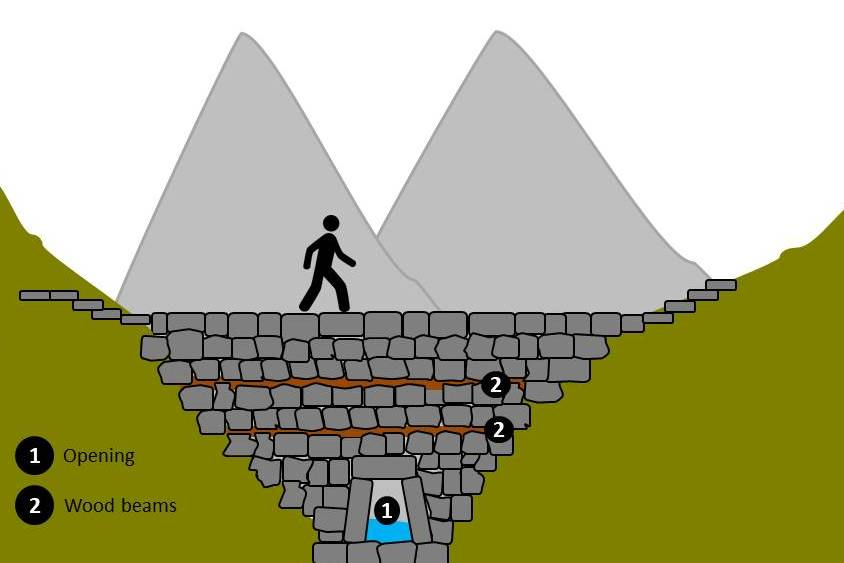
A sketch of the rumichaka in the Tarija region, Bolivia

To cross rivers flat banks, floating reeds tied together were used, forming of a row of totora boats placed side to side and covered with a board of totora and earth.

Inca rope bridges also provided access across narrow valleys. A bridge across the Apurímac River, west of Cusco, spanned a distance of 45 metres (148 ft). Rope bridges had to be replaced about every two years: to this end, the communities around the river crossing were commanded into a mita for the construction of the new bridge, while the old bridge was cut and let fall into the river. This type of bridge was built with ropes of vegetable fibers, such as ichu (Stipa ichu) a fiber typical of the Altiplano, which were tied together to form cords and ropes which constituted the bridge floor cables, the two handrails and the necessary connections between them.

Ravines were sometimes crossed by large hanging baskets, or oroyas, which could span distances of over 50 metres (160 ft).

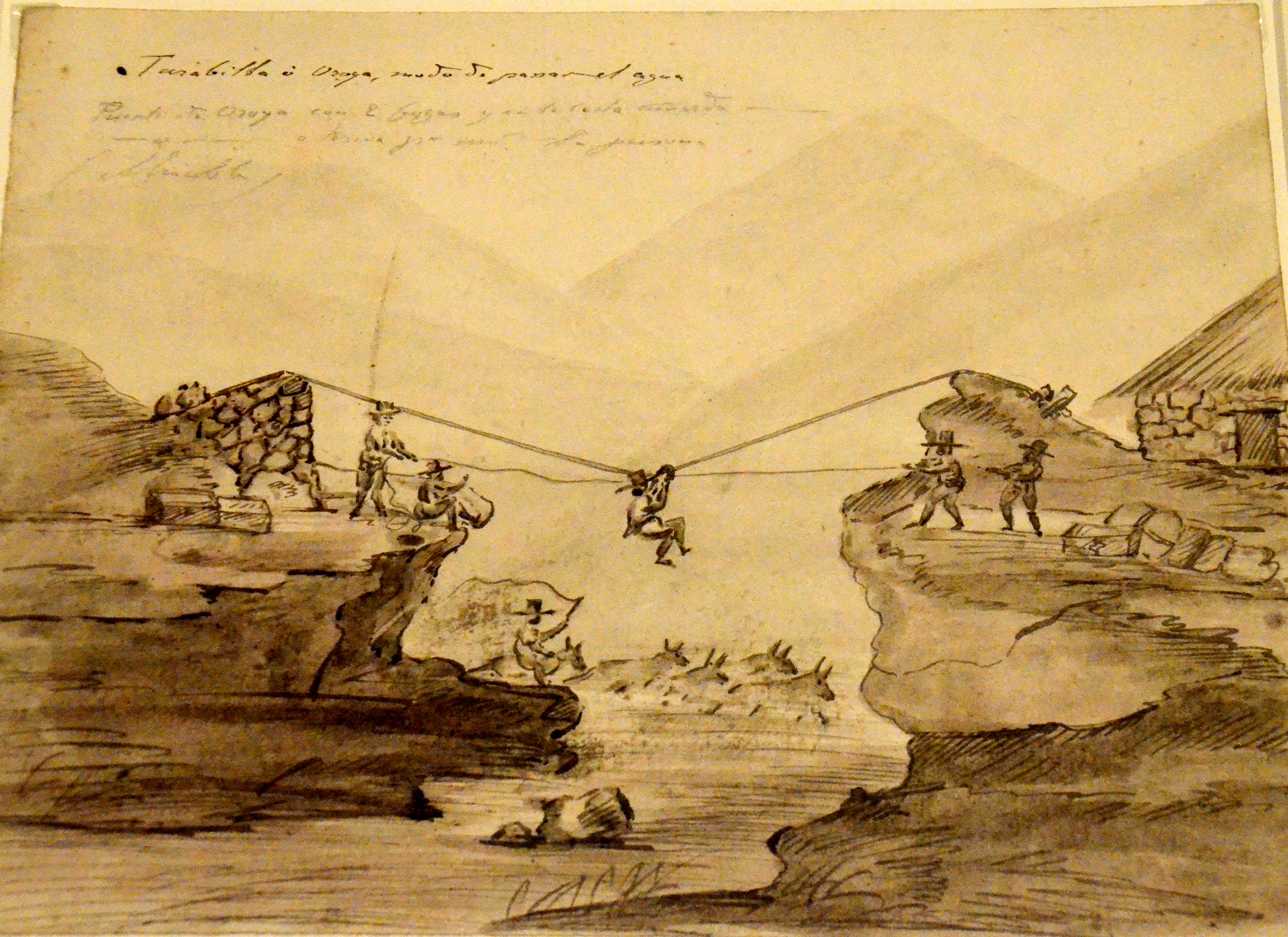
An "oroya" or basket to cross rivers. watercolor on paper portrayed in the Lima "MALI" museum, Anonymous - public domain

=== Tunnel ===
To access the famous Apurímac rope bridge it was necessary for the road to reach the narrowest section of the gorge: to this end, the road was cut along a natural fault into the steep rock of the valley and a tunnel was carved to facilitate the way. The tunnel had a series of side openings allowing the light to come in. There is no evidence of other tunnels along the Inca roads.

=== Equipment ===
Garcilaso de la Vega underlines the presence of infrastructure on the Inca road system where all across the Empire lodging posts for state officials and chasqui messengers were ubiquitous, well-spaced and well provisioned. Food, clothes, and weapons were also stored and kept ready for the Inca army marching through the territory.

The tambos were the most numerous and perhaps more important buildings in the operation of the road network. They were constructions of varied architecture and size whose function was mainly the lodging of the travellers and the storage of products for their supply. For this reason, they were located at a day's journey interval, although irregularities were identified in their distances, probably linked to various factors such as the presence of water sources, the existence of land with agricultural produce or the presence of pre-Inca centers. The tambos were most probably administered by the local populations since many of them are associated with settlements with additional constructions for different uses, such as canchas (rectangular enclosures bordered by a wall, probably used as accommodation for walkers), and collcas and kallancas. These latter were rectangular buildings of considerable size, which the Conquistadors called barns for their length. They were used for ceremonies and for accommodation of diverse nature: members of the Inca or local elites, mitimaes or other travelers. Tambos were so frequent that many Andean regional place names include the word tambo in them.

At the roadside the chasquiwasis, or relay stations for the Inca messenger chasqui, were frequent. In these places the chasquis waited for the messages they had to take to other locations. The fast flow of information was important for an Empire that was in constant expansion. The chasquiwasis were normally quite small and there is little archaeological evidence and research on them.

== Inca Trail to Machu Picchu ==
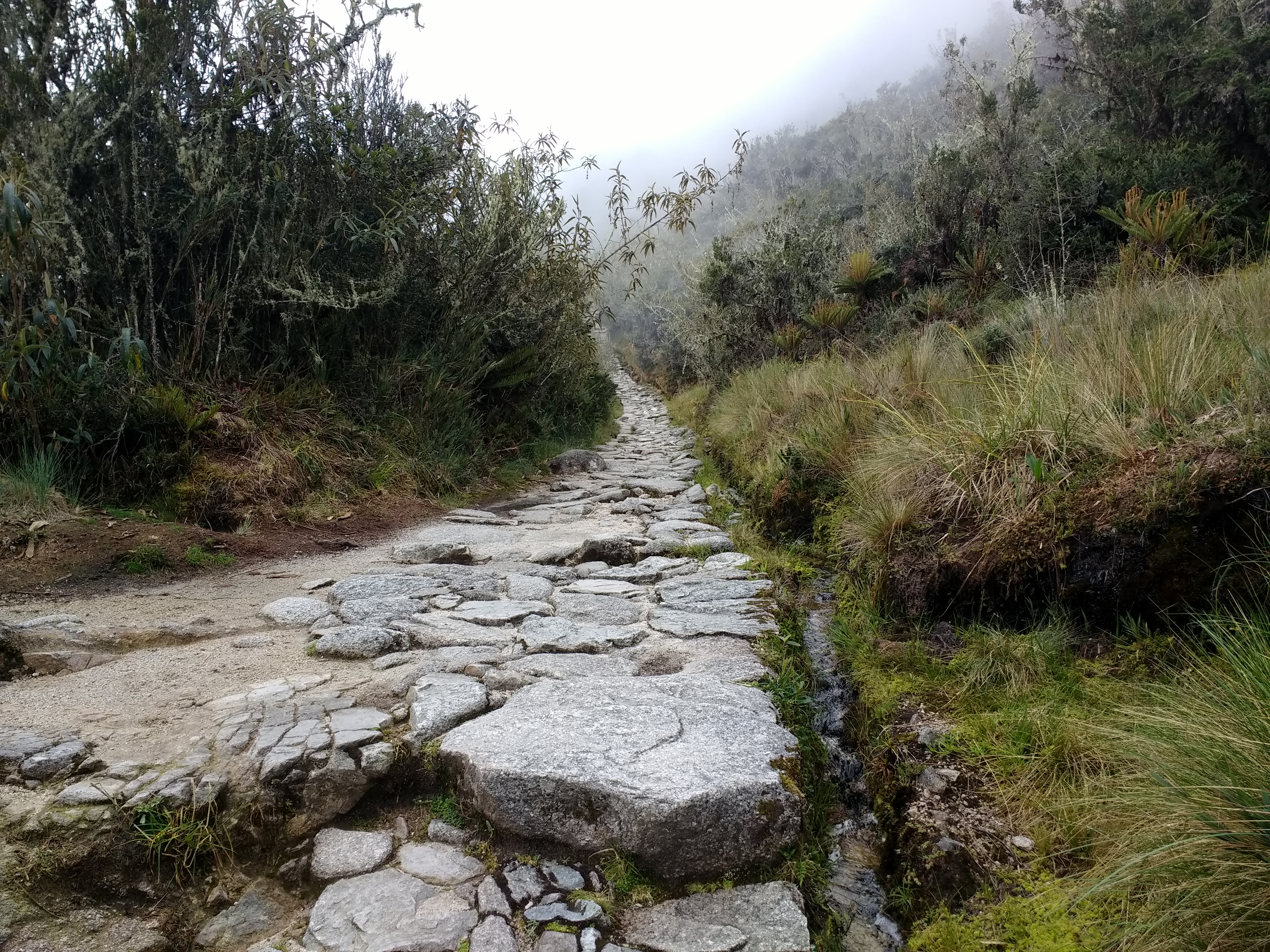
Enroute to Machu Picchu on an Inca road.

Machu Picchu itself was far off the beaten path, and served as a royal estate populated by the ruling Inca and several hundred servants. It required regular infusions of goods and services from Cusco and other parts of the Empire. This is evidenced by the fact that there are no large government storage facilities at the site. A 1997 study concluded that the site's agricultural potential would not have been sufficient to support residents, even on a seasonal basis.

== See also ==
- Inca Empire
- Inca society
- Incan agriculture
- Inca architecture
- Inca rope bridge

== Bibliography ==
- Cameron, Ian (1990). Kingdom of the Sun God: a history of the Andes and their people. New York: Facts on File. p. 65. ISBN 0-8160-2581-9.
- D'Altroy, Terence N (1992). Provincial Power in the Inka Empire. Smithsonian Institution. ISBN 1-56098-115-6.
- D'Altroy, Terence N. (2002). The Incas. Blackwell Publishers. ISBN 0-631-17677-2.
- Fellman, Bruce (2002). "Rediscovering Mach Picchu". Yale Alumni Magazine.
- Inca: Lords of Gold and Glory. New York, New York: Time-Life Books. 1992. ISBN 0-8094-9870-7.
- Jenkins, David (2001). "Network Analysis of Inka Roads, Administrative Centers, and Storage Facilities" (Volume 48 ed.). Duke University Press. pp. 655–87.
- "Main Andean Road – Qhapaq Nan". UNESCO. 10 July 2009.
- Rostworowski de Diez Canseco, Maria; Harry B. Iceland (1999). History of the Inca realm. Cambridge, UK: Cambridge University Press. ISBN 0-521-63759-7.
- Rugeles, Ernesto F (1979). SeriesIndian Traditions : The chasqui : an Inca tradition. Voluntad. ISBN 0832502634.
- Salazar, Lucy C.; Richard L. Burger (2004). Lifestyles of the Rich and Famous: Luxury and Daily Life in the Households of Machu Picchu's Elite. Dumbarton Oaks.
- Thompson, Donald E.; John V. Murra (July 1966). "The Inca Bridges in the Huanuco Region". American Antiquity. 5. 31 (1). Society for American Archaeology: 632–39. doi:10.2307/2694488. JSTOR 2694488. S2CID 155264894.
- Vergara, Teresa (2000). Historia del Peru, Tahuantinsuyu. Spain: Lexus Editores. p. 301. ISBN 9972-625-35-4.
- Vitry, Christian (2007). "Roads for Rituals and Sacred Mountains. A study of the Inka Road Systems in High Altitude Shrines in the North". Bulletin of the Chilean Museum of Pre-Columbian Art.
