= Paria, Oruro =

Archaeological site in Bolivia

Coordinates: 17°49′22″S 67°01′11″W

Paria (Aymara: Pariya) is a hamlet in Cercado Province in the Bolivian department of Oruro. It is situated at an altitude of 3,767 metres (12,359 ft), in a cultivated valley 27 kilometres (17 mi) northeast of the city of Oruro. It had a population of 106 people as of the 2012 census. Paria was an important administrative center of the Inca Empire in the late fifteenth and sixteenth centuries, and was the first Spanish settlement in Bolivia, founded in 1535. The ruins of Paria la Vieja or Paria la Vieja (English: Old Paria) are located 2 kilometres (1.2 mi) east of the present day settlement.

== History ==
=== Inca era ===
The Inca Empire and road system with the location of Paria in present-day Bolivia.

Paria existed as a settlement of the Uru people long before the Inca Empire. The Inca emperor Topa Inca Yupanqui (ruled 1471-1493) conquered the Paria region while expanding the Inca Empire south from Cuzco. He selected Paria as capital of Charcas province, a much larger area than what is today called Charcas. The maize crop from Cochabamba to the east passed through Paria en route to Cuzco or was stored in Paria. Later in the 1520s, soldiers to serve in the Inca military campaigns in the northern Andes gathered in Paria before their journey north. Paria was located on the royal road (Camino Real) of the Inca which stretched from Quito in the North to the Maule River in present-day Chile.

Paria under the Incas, in the words of a Catholic priest, was "an administrative and military center, a miniature Cuzco with numerous settlements under its jurisdiction, from where the Inca emperor exercised his sovereignty over Qullasuyu [one of the four main parts of the Inca Empire]. It has temples for Inti, the cult of the Sun of the Incas, convents for ñustas (princesses), civil and military buildings, storage silos (qullqas) and lodging places [tambos]."

=== Spanish era ===
In 1535, the conquistador Diego de Almagro set forth from Cuzco with the goal of conquering land and finding riches in the territory south of Cuzco in what is today Bolivia and Chile. An advance party led by Juan de Saavedra and including Villac Umu, an Inca religious leader, Paullu Inca, the brother of Inca emperor, Manco Inca, Augustianian priests, 150 Spanish soldiers, and hundreds of native soldiers. Arriving at Paria on January 23, 1535, the Spanish destroyed many of the buildings and founded Paria La Nueva (New Paria). Almagro and the bulk of his army arrived in Paria later that year and proceeded southward to conquer additional lands. The Augustinian priests who accompanied Saavedrea founded a parish in Paria

In 1565, the Corregimiento (district) of Paria was created as part of Charcas Province. Paria district existed until 1782. A (probably partial) census of Paria district in the 1570s counted 2,500 households equivalent to a population of approximately 12,500 people. All those counted were native Andeans although a few Roman Catholic priests were working in the province.

The church in Paria has been declared a National Monument by the Bolivian government.

== Ruins ==
The location of Paria la Viexa has been disputed, but a 2010 article locates it 2 kilometres (1.2 mi) east of the present hamlet of Paria. There, scattered over an area of 100 hectares (250 acres), are the ruins of large buildings, more than 1,000 qullqas for storing grain, and pottery dating mostly from the Inca period. The site is larger than any other known archaeological site in the area, thus strengthening the opinion that this is the site of Paria la Vieja.
