= Mit'a =

Mandatory service in the Inca Empire

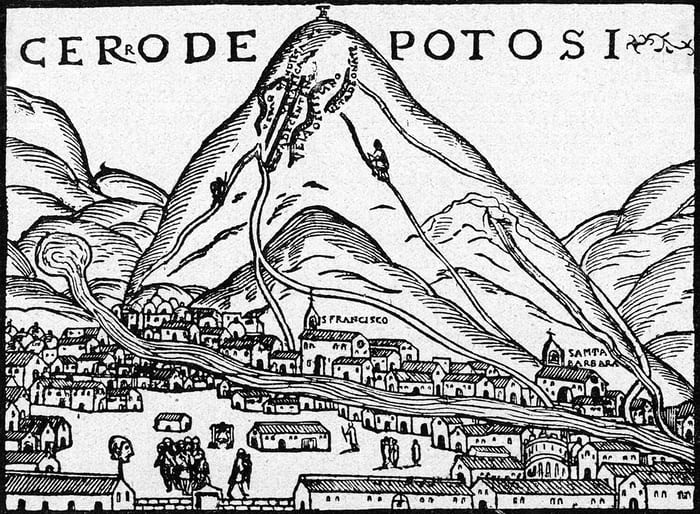
The Cerro Rico of Potosí, which made use of Indigenous labor (1552 engraving).

Mit'a (Quechua pronunciation: [ˈmɪˌtʼa]) was a system of mandatory labor service in the Inca Empire, as well as in Spain's empire in America. Mit'a (federal work) was effectively a form of tribute to the Inca government in the form of labor, a corvée. Tax labor accounted for much of the Inca state tax revenue; beyond that, it was used for the construction of the road network, bridges, agricultural terraces, and fortifications in ancient Peru. Military service was also mandatory.

All citizens who could perform labor were required to do so for a set number of days out of a year (the basic meaning of the word mit'a is a regular 'turn' or a 'season'). The Inca Empire's wealth meant a family often needed only 65 days to farm; the rest of the year was devoted entirely to the mit'a. Mit'a was repurposed by the Spanish Crown in 1573, drafting one-seventh of the adult male population to work in mines.

The regionally mandatory mink'a is a close relative of mit'a. It is still in use in small-scale Quechua communities today and known as faena in Spanish. Mit'a was adopted during the 1960s on large-scale federal projects of Peru.

== Religious worship ==
The Incas elaborated creatively on a preexisting system of not only the mit'a exchange of labor but also the exchange of the objects of religious veneration of the peoples whom they took into their empire. This exchange ensured proper compliance among conquered peoples. In this instance, wak'as and paqarinas became significant centers of shared worship and a point of unification of their ethnically and linguistically diverse empire, bringing unity and citizenship to often geographically disparate peoples. That eventually led to a system of pilgrimages throughout all of these various shrines by the indigenous people of the empire prior to the introduction of Catholicism.

Enormous construction of highways and structures were possible in part only by the use of the mit'a. All the people worked for the government for a certain period of time. This labor was free for the Inca ruler. During the Inca period, men were required to work 65 days in the field to provide food for his family. When someone's turn came, he joined the various works that used the mit'a. A communal type of elemental provisions and needs was set up in order to care for the families of those who were absent for mit'a. People worked in building highways, the construction of homes for the emperor and nobility, monuments, bridges, fields belonging to priests and the emperor, and mines.

== System ==
All males starting at the age of fifteen were required to participate in the mit'a to do public services. This remained mandatory until the age of fifty. However, the Inca rule was flexible on the amount of time one could share on the mit'a turn. Overseers were responsible to make sure that a person after fulfilling his duty in the mit'a still had enough time to care for his own land and family.

The construction of bridges and oroyas was the responsibility of the local ethnic groups, who divided the work according to the mit'a system, with the population divided into hanan and urin or ichuq (ichoc) and allawqa (allauca) (upper and lower, left and right). During viceregal times, the Andean method of distributing labor obligations among the ethnic groups was preserved, which permitted the continued maintenance of these public works. The war mit'a took men from their ayllus to serve in the state armies. All labor in the Andean world was performed as a rotational service, whether for maintaining the tampus, roads, bridges or for guarding the storehouses or other such tasks. The craftspeople enjoyed a special status in the Inca state. Although they worked for the state, they did not take part in the agricultural or war mit'a. The agrarian mit'a was distinct from the fishing mit'a, and these labor groups never intervened in each other's occupations. In the señorio of Chincha, the fishermen numbered ten thousand, and went to sea in turns, the rest of the time enjoying themselves by dancing and drinking. The Spaniard criticized them as lazy drunkards because they did not go to sea daily and all at once. The mining mit'a was also fulfilled at the level of ayllus, of the local lord, and, in the last instance, of the state.

The significance of the term mit'a goes beyond that of the system for organizing labor. It contains a certain Andean philosophical concept of eternal repetition. The constellation of the Pleiades, called cabrillas ('little goats') by the Spaniards, were known as unquy (Quechua for 'disease', Hispanicized oncoy) during the rainy season mit'a, and as qullqa (Quechua for 'storehouse') during the season of harvest and abundance. The seasons were divided into the dry mit'a and the rainy mit'a. The day mit'a succeeded the night mit'a in a repetition that reflected an ordering of time that the natives conceptualized as a cyclical organizational system of order and chaos.

== Categorization of lands ==
During the Inca period, people were mostly dependent on the cultivation of their land. All the fields of the Empire were divided into three categories: the Field of the Temple, the Emperor, and People. Temple lands provided sacrifices for local Huacas, as well as imperial ones such as Inti and Viracocha. Imperial fields were generally cultivated to provide tribute for the Sapa Inca and nobility. The surpluses from these fields also served to provide for state storehouses which were used for disaster relief or to supply mit'a corvee laborers tasked with building imperial projects such as roads. Lastly, the fields of the People included the common lands that were divided among the local ayllu annually based on household size. These fields also included those for the sick, the elderly, widows, and soldiers on campaign.

At the beginning of plowing time, people started to work first at the fields of widows, of sick people and of wives of the soldiers under the direction of the village overseers. Then, they worked on their own field. Next, they worked on the temples' fields and kuraka fields and finally, they set to work on the emperor's fields. While they worked on the emperor's field, they typically wore their best dress and men and women chanted songs in praise to the Inca.

When people were engaged in war, their fields were cultivated by people engaged in mit'a. That way, soldiers would go to war with their fields and family secured and protected, which enhanced the loyalty and the focus on the part of Incan soldiers.

== Spanish rule ==
Under the viceroyalty of Francisco de Toledo, communities were required to provide one seventh of their male labor force at any given time for public works, mines and agriculture. The system became an intolerable burden on the Inca communities and abuses were common. Complaints and revolts occurred and new laws were passed by Philip III but they only had a limited effect. The Inca and Spanish mit'as served different purposes. The Inca mit'a provided public goods, such as maintenance of road networks and sophisticated irrigation and cropping systems that required intercommunity coordination of labor. The majority of Inca subjects performed their mit'a obligations in or near their home communities, often in agriculture; service in mines was extremely rare. In contrast, the Spanish mit'a acted as a subsidy to private mining interests and the Spanish nation, which used tax revenues from silver production largely to finance European wars.

A 2021 study in the Journal of Economic History found that the colonial mit'a system in Peru caused the decimation of the male native-born population. According to David Brading, assignment to the mines was considered worse than the death sentence so that many rather ended their own life than comply. Already in the 17th century, Juan de Solórzano Pereyra argued that mit'a mining was excessively cruel and should be abolished and mining replaced with domestically useful production.

== Working in mines ==
The Spanish conquistadors also used the same labor system to supply the workforce they needed for the silver mines, which was the basis of their economy in the colonial period. Under the leadership of Viceroy Francisco de Toledo, who was dispatched to Peru in 1569, the mit'a system greatly expanded as Toledo sought to increase silver outputs from the Potosí silver mine.

Toledo recognized that without a steady, reliable and inexpensive source of labor, mining would not be able to grow at the speed that the Spanish crown had requested. Under Toledo's leadership, the first mit'a recruits arrived in Potosí in 1573 from the regions directly surrounding the Potosí mine. At its peak, recruitment for the Potosí mit'a extended to an area that was nearly 200,000 square miles (520,000 km^{2}) and included much of southern Peru and present-day Bolivia.

The conquistadors used the concept of mit'a to suit their own needs. The mit'a is considered to be the ancient and original version of mandatory state service. The Spanish mit'a system had severe impacts on the native population, which was of able-bodied workers at a time while their communities were experiencing demographic collapse. It also resulted in natives fleeing their communities to evade the mit'a. With fewer workers able to work the fields, the farming production went down, resulting in famine and malnutrition for many native communities in the region.

Research by Melissa Dell found that the mining mit'a resulted in negative long-term effects for the regions where it occurred. This included lower levels of education and household consumption, less developed road networks, and a decrease in public good provision (due to there being very few haciendas, whose owners generally supported greater provision of public goods). Abad and Maurer (2025) have challenged these results. Their research shows that there are no long-term effects in modern Peru or in the area studied by Dell when historically accurate coding of coerced labor locations are taken into account.

== Mitma resettlement system ==
The mit'a labor tribute is not to be confused with the related Inca policy of deliberate resettlements referred to by the Quechua word mitma (mitmaq means 'outsider' or 'newcomer') or its Hispanicized forms, mitima or mitimaes (plural). That involved transplanting whole groups of people for the benefit of imperial stability. Under this system, colonists from loyal communities were sent to regions which were suspected of disloyalty or of harboring rebellious intent. Mitma colonists in this circumstance were given full access to state storehouses for two years and the native population was expected to provide for their needs. Mitma colonists were empowered to spy on native populations and to destroy rebellious conspiracies. In this way, these colonists became a pacifying force for the Incan imperial project, that effectively cost the state very little.

On the other hand, disloyal populations were at times forcibly deported from their homelands under the mitma system as well. This was usually the case if a population had rebelled and the Incan state viewed them with deep distrust. These exiles were forcibly removed from their homelands and brought to lands that the Inca had firm control over. Both colonist and deported mitma populations were forbidden from returning to their homelands, and were heavily punished for attempting to return home.

== Lasting effects ==
Mit'a districts historically achieved lower levels of education, and today, they remain less integrated into road networks. Finally, data from the most recent agricultural census document that residents of mit'a districts are substantially more likely to be subsistence farmers since haciendas, rural estates with an attached labor force, were banned in mit'a districts to minimize the competition the state faced in accessing scarce mit'a labor. It was the hacienda elite that possessed the political connections required to secure public goods such as roads. The hacienda elites were the ones who were lobbying for roads as many haciendas as possible, and empirical evidence links roads to increased market participation and higher household income.

The fact that farmers from mit'a districts do not have greater access to paved roads means that they are unable to transport crops to larger, regional markets. It is unlikely that these farmers simply do not wish to participate in the market. In the case of Peru, throughout the 1980s, Shining Path, as part of their Maoist ideology, attempted to turn farmers away from commercial farming; their efforts were largely unpopular and met with resistance.

More recently, in 2004, residents of Ilave, a mit'a district, lynched their local mayor, in part for his inability to follow through with promises to pave the town's access road and build a local market. Overall, former mit'a districts suffer from lower economic performance, as demonstrated by generally lower household consumption and increased rates of stunted growth. Without haciendas to compete with the more exploitative Spanish system, mit'a districts were subjected to greater economic and health pressures from their labor. Melissa Dell has shown that the repercussions of this disparity have persisted past the end of the mit'a system as mit'a districts were less integrated with the greater road network.

== Government application in modern Peru ==
The only example of re-applying the Inca-style mit'a in a modern state, as a government policy, occurred in Peru during the two Popular Action governments under President Fernando Belaúnde Terry (1963–1968 and 1980–1985). Under this government, a state institution called Cooperación Popular ('Popular Cooperation') was launched, strongly inspired by the strategy of labor tribute in the Incan mit'a. During the ten years this institution operated, more infrastructure projects were accomplished in Peru than in most of the 140-year Republican era (from 1821 to 1963). The results were hundreds of kilometers of roads, aqueducts, communal and municipal works and other infrastructure pieces.

=== Cooperación Popular ===
The principle of the institution was quite simple: given the rather scarce economic resources of the Peruvian state in the early 1960s, the public works that this institution would do should have been "co-financed" by the beneficiaries, namely through contributions of labor.

In any given public works project in Peru, it is estimated that between 60 and 70% of the cost goes to the acquisition of materials, and the remaining 30–40% are labor costs. Applying the principle of the Incan mit'a, the government fronted the acquisition of goods, and the beneficiaries provided the labor services without salary; this allowed the Peruvian state to save 30–40% for public works during this period – these savings were invested in further public works projects. The beneficiaries in turn contributed their communal workforce in exchange for accelerated development of their communities and the expansion of infrastructure in Peru.

=== South Korean commission ===
In 1964, the government of South Korea became aware of the significant results achieved in Peru, and sent a commission to meet with the Peruvian government. The commission studied the methodology and organization of the Peruvian labor tribute institution and the feasibility of applying it to the Republic of Korea. After a few months in Peru, the commission returned to South Korea and rolled out its own modern version of the Incan mit'a to Korean production systems, including the manufacturing industry. The results obtained in Korea were even more positive than those obtained in Peru due to a different development approach.

== See also ==
- Ayni (Quechuan personal reciprocity)
- Repartimiento
- Encomienda
