= Qullqa =

Inca storage building

The Inca empire and the roads which traversed it

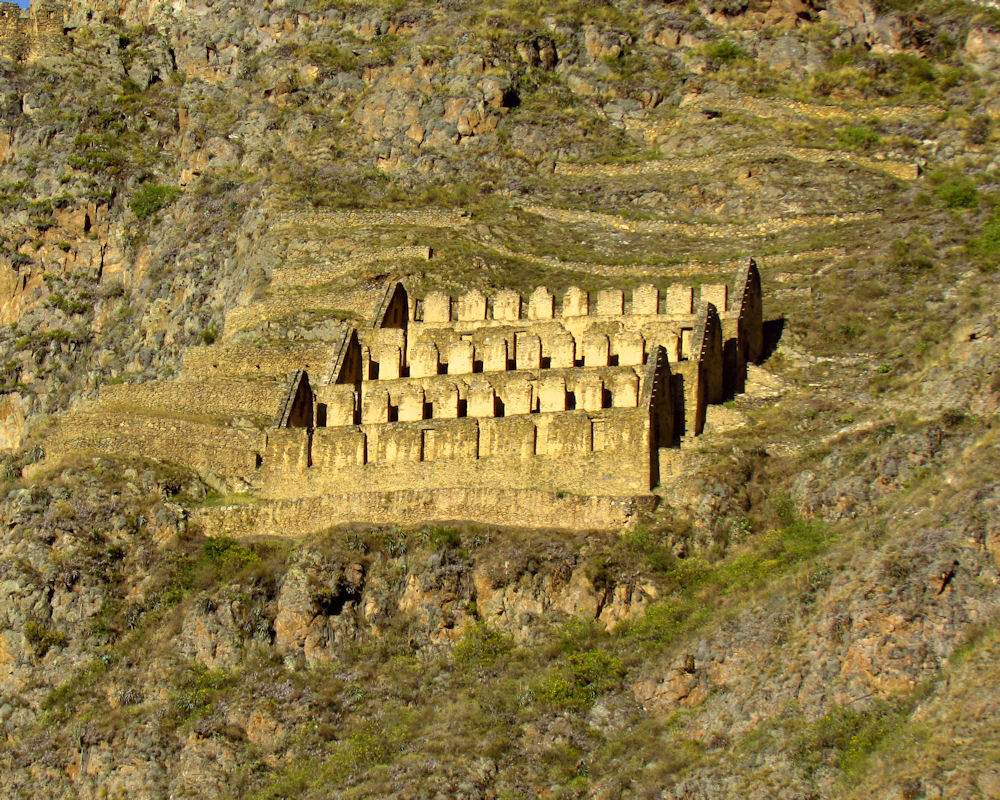
A complex of 27 Qullqas above Ollantaytambo, Peru

A qullqa (Quechua pronunciation: [ˈqʊʎˌqa] "deposit, storehouse"; (spelling variants: colca, collca, qolca, qollca) was a storage building found along roads and near the cities and political centers of the Inca Empire. These were large stone buildings with roofs thatched with "ichu" grass, or what is known as Peruvian feathergrass (Jarava ichu). To a "prodigious [extent] unprecedented in the annals of world prehistory" the Incas stored food and other commodities which could be distributed to their armies, officials, conscripted laborers, and, in times of need, to the populace. The uncertainty of agriculture at the high altitudes which comprised most of the Inca Empire was among the factors which probably stimulated the construction of large numbers of qullqas.

== Background ==
The pre-Columbian Andean civilizations, of which the Inca Empire was the last, faced severe challenges in feeding the millions of people who were their subjects. The heartland of the empire and much of its arable land was at elevations between 3,000 metres (9,800 ft) to more than 4,000 metres (13,000 ft) and subject to frost, hail, and drought. Tropical crops could not be grown in the short growing seasons and a staple crop, maize, could not usually be grown above 3,200 metres (10,500 ft) in elevation. The people at higher elevations grew potatoes, quinoa and a few other root and pseudocereal crops. Herding llamas and alpacas for meat, wool, and as beasts of burden was important.

Storage facilities were also necessary because the Incas did not have navigable rivers, wheeled vehicles, or large draft animals, although llamas were capable of moving large amounts of bulky commodities. Nor did the Incas have a well-developed monetary, financial, or trading system to facilitate commerce. Thus, food and other items were stored near where they were produced and distributed by the State when necessary.

The response of the Incas to the challenges of their environment and technology was a huge and well-organized system of qullqas to collect and store food and other items during good harvest years for distribution when needed. Large numbers of qullqas were constructed near every major governmental center, state-owned farm, temple, and royal estate. Qullqas were built at every "tambo", which were inns located a day's march, about 22 kilometres (14 mi), from each other along many of the 40,000 kilometres (25,000 mi) of royal highways.

The qullqas were primarily used to supply Inca officials and armies on the move as they relied on the qullqas for food rather than foraging—to the deprivation of the agricultural population—which was the common means by which armies around the world supplied their needs until the modern era. Another use for the stored items, especially food, was for the ceremonial feasts that were an important part of the relationship between the rulers and their subjects. Food was also distributed to the general populace in cases of crop failures or shortages of food.

== Products stored ==
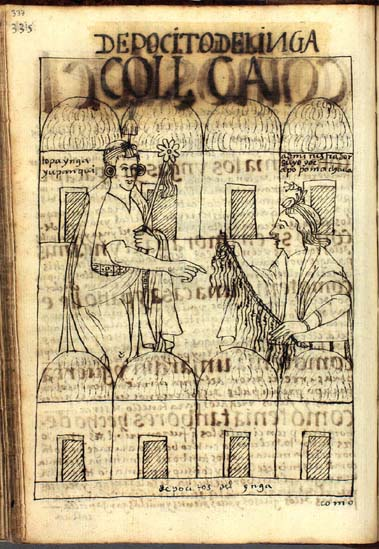
Qullqas (Inca Warehouses) by Guaman Poma

The products stored in qullqas varied from region to region in the Inca Empire depending upon production in the local area. At Wanuku Pampa in north central Peru, a major Inca administrative and storage area, 50 to 80 percent of the qullqas were used to store dried potatoes and other root crops. Only 5 to 7 percent of qullqas were devoted to the storage of maize, probably because the high altitudes and cool climate limited the local production of maize. Root crops were layered with straw and baled for storage. Maize was shelled and stored in large jars.

Additional agriculture products stored in qullqas consisted of quinoa, beans, other vegetables, dried meat (Ch'arki or jerky), and seeds. Non-agricultural goods stored included textiles and clothing, wool, cotton, and feathers (used in clothing), tools and weapons and gold and silver vessels and other luxury items. Inventories of items stored were kept on quipus, the knotted strings the Incas used in lieu of a written language.

The scope of the Inca's commitment for storage is described by Pedro Sánchez de la Hoz, the first Spanish chronicler to visit the Inca capital of Cuzco, who said that in the city «[there are] storehouses full of blankets, wool, weapons, metals and clothes and of everything that is grown and made in this realm ... and there is a house in which are kept more than 100,000 dried birds, for from their feathers articles of clothing are made. ... There are shields, beams for supporting house roofs, knives, and other tools; sandals and armor for the people of war in such quantity that it is not possible to comprehend.»

The economy of the Inca Empire was to a large extent redistributive. "The Inca state seems to have financed itself primarily through direct managerial command of land, labor, and storage systems, rather than through a market exchange system." Under the mit'a system, citizens were required to contribute labor to the Empire and the resultant production of food, textiles, and other goods were stored by the State to be distributed as needed.

Agricultural products such as maize and quinoa might have had a storage life of one or two years and treated products such as freeze-dried potatoes and dried meat might have had a storage life of 2–4 years. However, early Spanish chroniclers said that some products were stored for up to 10 years.

== Size, numbers and location ==
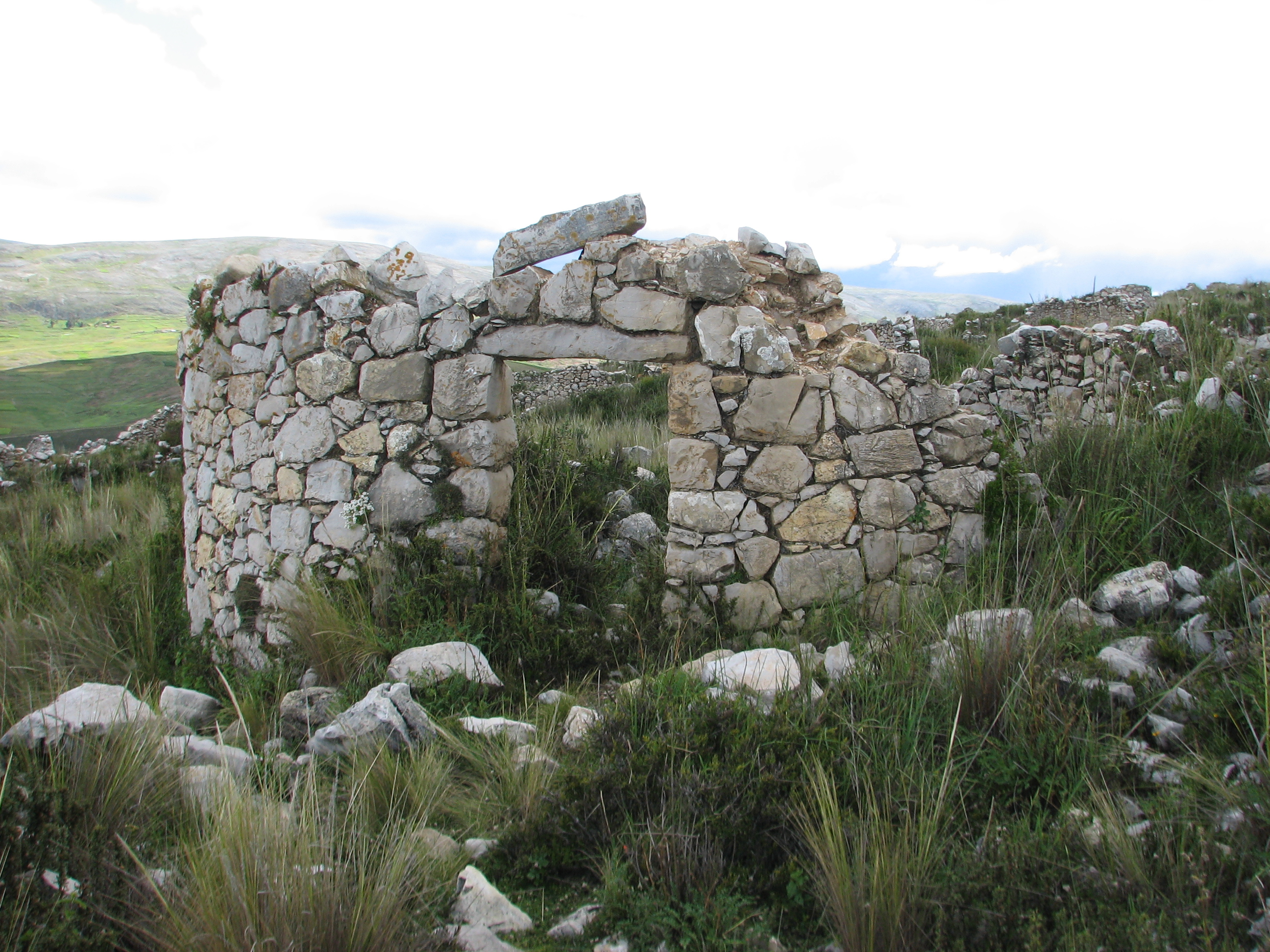
The remains of a qullqa in the Mantaro River Valley

Qullqa's were generally built of masonry in connected groups on dry hillsides to take advantage of drainage and winds. Their size and design varied from region to region, but round qullqas were typically used to store maize and rectangular qullqas were used to store freeze-dried potatoes ("chuño") and other root crops. Qullqas had a ventilation system consisting of a channel beneath the floor to permit air to enter and an opening under the roof to allow air to escape.

The interior diameter of an average small qullqa was 3.23 metres (10.6 ft); larger qullqas have a diameter of around 3.5–4.0 metres (11.5–13.1 ft). These smaller qullqas could have held 3.7 cubic metres (100 US bushels) of maize, and larger qullqa could have held about 5.5 cubic metres (160 US bushels) of maize.

Most of the remains of qullqas near Cuzco have disappeared due to urban expansion and development over the centuries. The largest remaining number of qullqas is in the Mantaro River valley between the present days cities of Huancayo and Jauja, Peru. This broad valley, some 60 kilometres (37 mi) long contains about 65,000 hectares (160,000 acres) of cultivatable lands ranging in elevation from 3,200 metres (10,500 ft) to 4,250 metres (13,940 ft), the highest elevation at which cultivation was possible in this area.

The Mantaro Valley was one of the largest and most fertile high-altitude areas of the Inca Empire. 2,573 qullqas have been found in the valley by archaeologists. Half of them were placed in the center of this grain-producing area, another half scattered among 48 compounds along the course of the river. In total, the qullqas of the Mantaro Valley had a storage area of 170,000 square meters, possibly the largest storage facilities in the Inca Empire and in pre-Columbian America. Illustrating the quantity of stored items, these qullqas supplied and equipped an army of 35,000 soldiers during the Spanish conquest of the 1530s.

Cochabamba in present day Bolivia, at a relatively low elevation of 2,500 metres (8,200 ft) was developed as a state farm by the Incas for maize production. On the hills to the south of the growing area above Lake Cotapachi were 2,400 qullqas, each cone shaped, about 3 metres (9.8 ft) in height and diameter and clustered in parallel lines in an area of 61 hectares (150 acres). Some of the maize produced in Cochabamba was transported by Llama caravan to the regional center of Paria, 100 kilometres (62 mi) west of Cochabamba, and hence on to Cuzco. One thousand qullqas have been discovered at Paria.

The Campo de Pucara in Argentina, 18 kilometres (11 mi) southwest of the city of Salta, had 1,717 qullqas of about the same size and apparently the same function as the qullqas at Cochabamba. All other provincial centers of the Empire had large numbers of qullqas built row after row on nearby hills.

== Other ==
Qullqa is also the Quechua language name for the constellation Pleiades. The Inca deity Qullqa, personified in the Pleiades, was the patron of warehousing and preserving seeds for the next season. Of all the stellar pantheon worshiped by Incas, Qullqa was the "mother", the senior over all heavenly patrons of earthly things.

== See also ==
- Inca Empire
- Incan agriculture
- Tampu: Tambo (Incan structure)
- Inca road system

== Bibliography ==
- Denise Y. Arnold, Christine A. Hastorf (2008). Heads of State: Icons, Power, and Politics in The Ancient and Modern Andes. Left Coast Press. ISBN 9781598741711.
- Terence N. D'Altroy (1992). Provincial Power in The Inca Empire. Smithsonian Institution Press. ISBN 9781560981152.
- Terence N. D'Altroy (2003). The Incas. Wiley-Blackwell. ISBN 1-4051-1676-5.
- Teofilo Laime Ajacopa (2007), Diccionario Bilingue Iskay Simipi Yuyayk'ancha, La Paz. (Quechua-Spanish Dictionary)
- Terry V. LeVine, Ed. (1992), Inca Storage Systems, University of Oklahoma Press, ISBN 0-8061-2440-7.
- Timothy Parsons (2010). The Rule of Empires: Those Who Built Them, Those Who Endured Them, and Why They Always Fall. Oxford University Press. ISBN 9780199746194
