= Celtic field =

Old name for prehistoric field systems in Europe

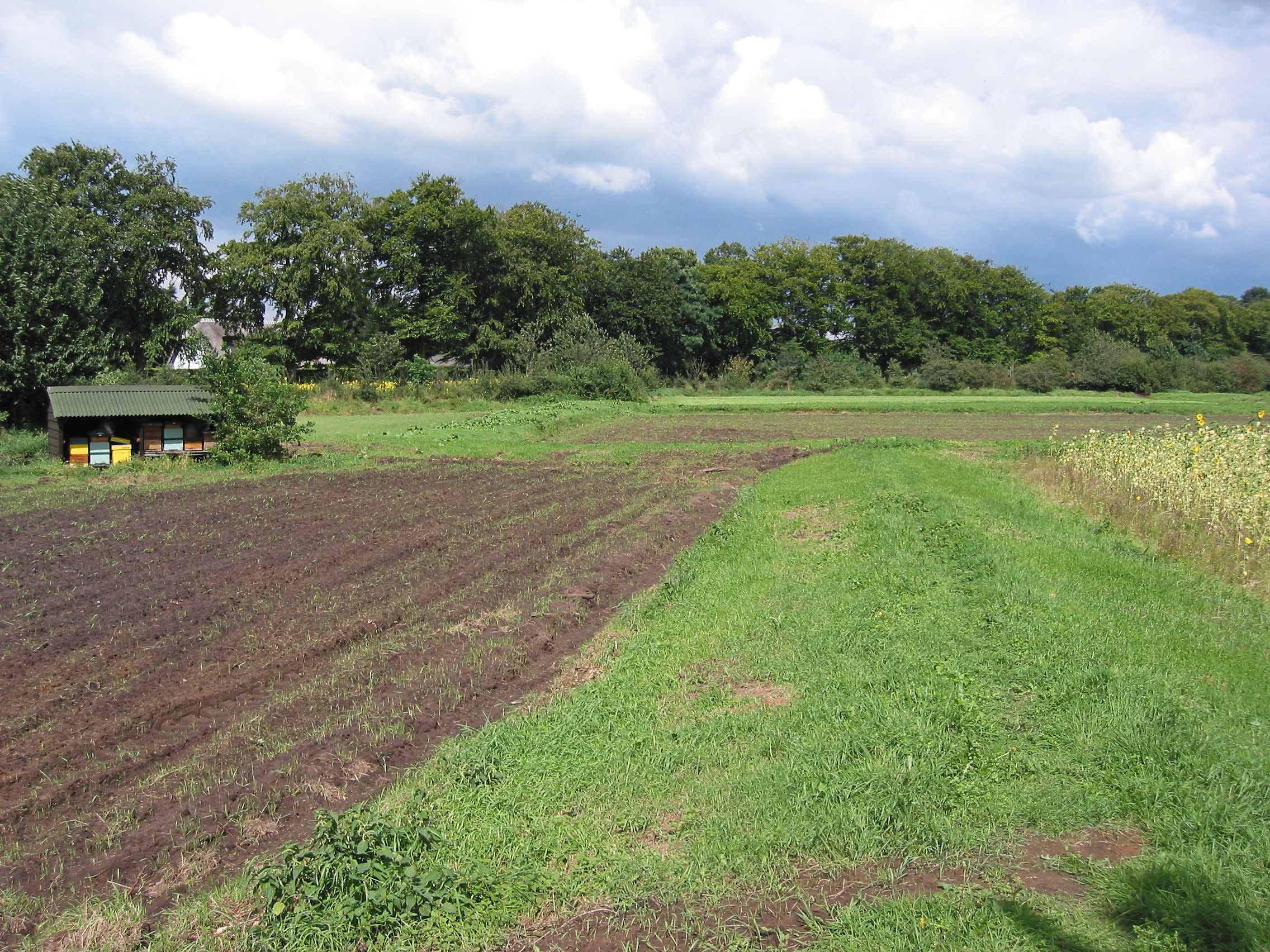
Celtic fields at the Wekeromse Zand in Gelderland, Netherlands

Celtic field is an old name for traces of early (prehistoric) agricultural field systems found in North-West Europe, i.e. Britain, Ireland, Belgium, Netherlands, Germany, Denmark, France, Sweden, Poland and the Baltic states. The fields themselves are not related to the Celtic culture.

The name was given by O. G. S. Crawford. They are sometimes preserved in areas where industrial farming has not been adopted and can date from any time from the Early Bronze Age (c. 1800 BC) until the early medieval period. They can be preserved as earthworks or soil marks.

They are characterised by their proximity to other ancient features such as enclosures, sunken lanes and farmsteads and are divided into a patchwork quilt of square plots rarely more than 2,000 m^{2} (0.49 acres) in area although larger examples are known (e.g. Dorset and Wiltshire). Their small size (35–50 m; 40–55 yd) implies that each was cultivated by a single person or household.

Lynchets, evidence of early ploughing can often be seen at the upper and lower ends. Large scale Roman agriculture replaced them in lowland Britain and they are more common in less accessible regions such as the West Country.

== See also ==
- Cord rig
- Run rig
- Rundale
- Céide Fields
