= Belderrig (archaeological site) =

- Location within Ireland
- 54°18′42.8″N 9°32′57.4″W
- Periods: Mesolithic, Neolithic
- Location: Belderrig
- Region: County Mayo

Site notes
- Excavation dates: 2005-2008
- Archaeologists: Graeme Warren

Archaeological excavations at Belderrig were initiated by Graeme Warren, School of Archaeology, University College Dublin, Ireland, after visiting the site in 2003 with its discoverer, archaeologist Seamas Caulfield. Belderrig is a small village on the North Mayo coast within the Céide Fields complex, a prehistoric landscape of field systems and related domestic and ritual structures dating to the Neolithic and Bronze Age.

The excavations took place directly on the low cliff on the east side of Belderrig Harbour by a large erosion scar, and continued uphill. The excavations uncovered a series of Mesolithic platforms and stony layers, with Mesolithic activity dating from around 4500 cal. BC, with a range of dates into the Neolithic, with a final date of around 2500 cal. BC. As well as the Mesolithic stony platforms and layers, the excavations uncovered a series of pits, and prehistoric field walls related to the Céide Fields complex. The stone tool assemblage is dominated by vein quartz artefacts, with a smaller amount of flint and siltstone.
