= Field system =

Organisation and delineation of certain agricultural fields

The study of field systems (collections of fields) in landscape history is concerned with the size, shape and orientation of a number of fields. These are often adjacent, but may be separated by a later feature.

== Field systems by region ==
=== Czech Republic ===
In the Czech Republic (ancient Bohemia, Moravia and Czech Silesia), Ervín Černý undertook a study of medieval field systems.

=== England ===
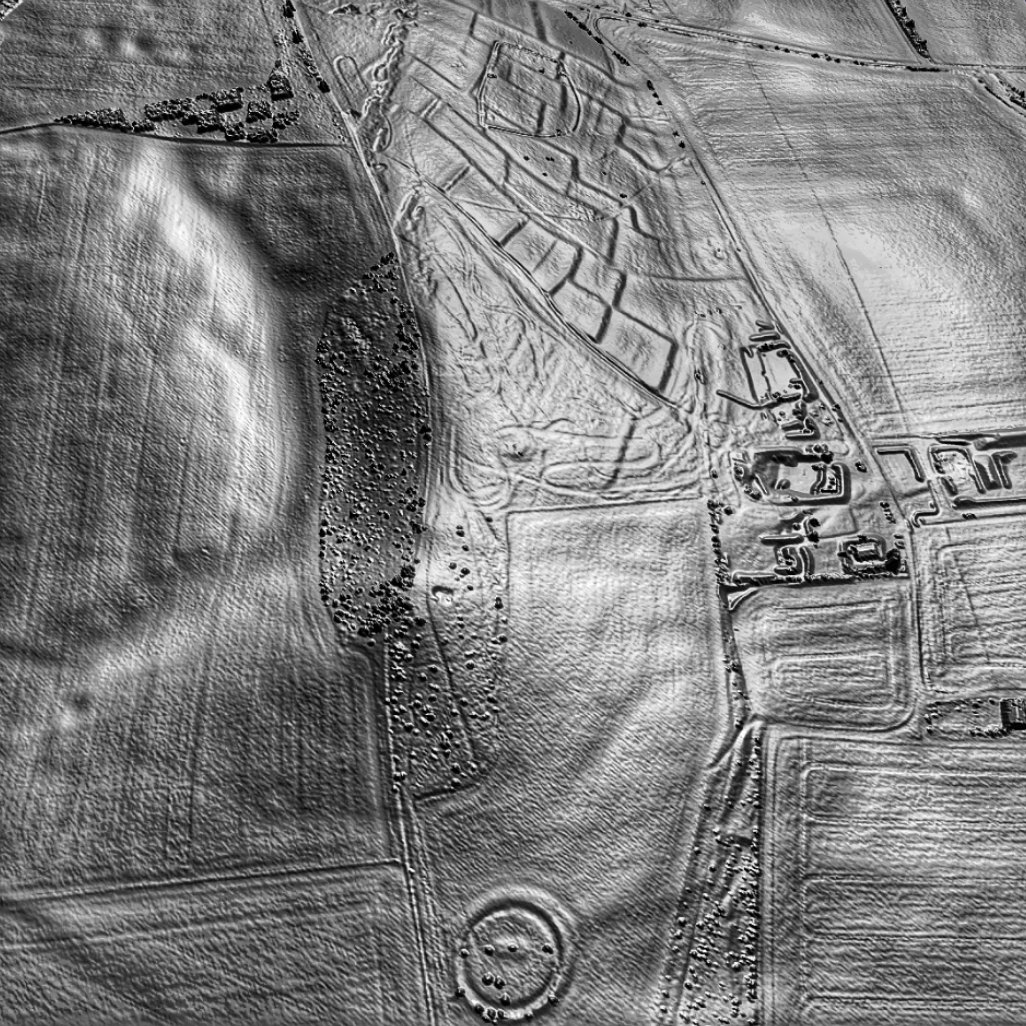
A lidar view of Burderop Down disc barrow, Iron Age settlement and Celtic field system in Wiltshire

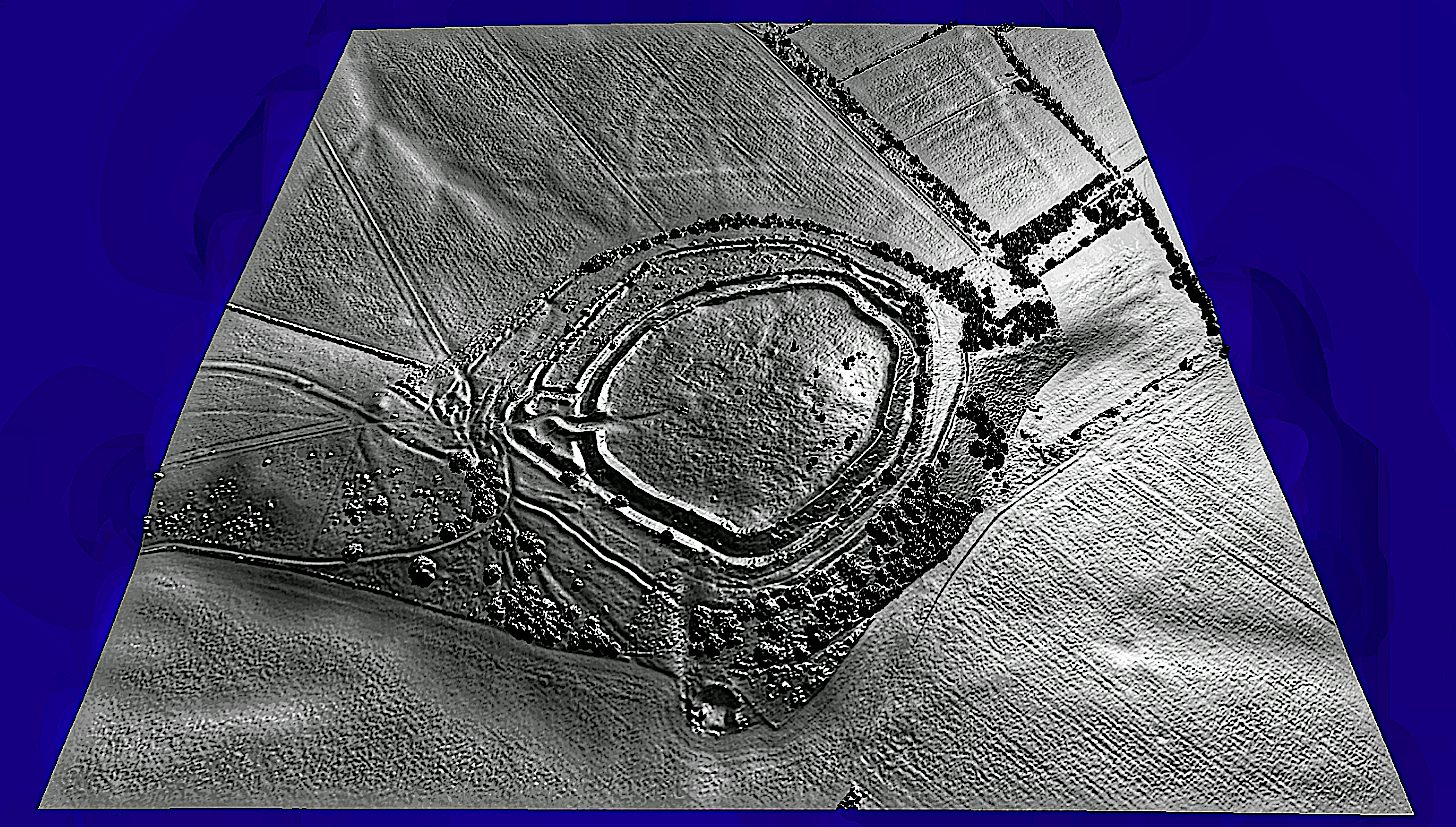
A lidar view of Danebury Iron Age hillfort and Celtic-like field system in Hampshire

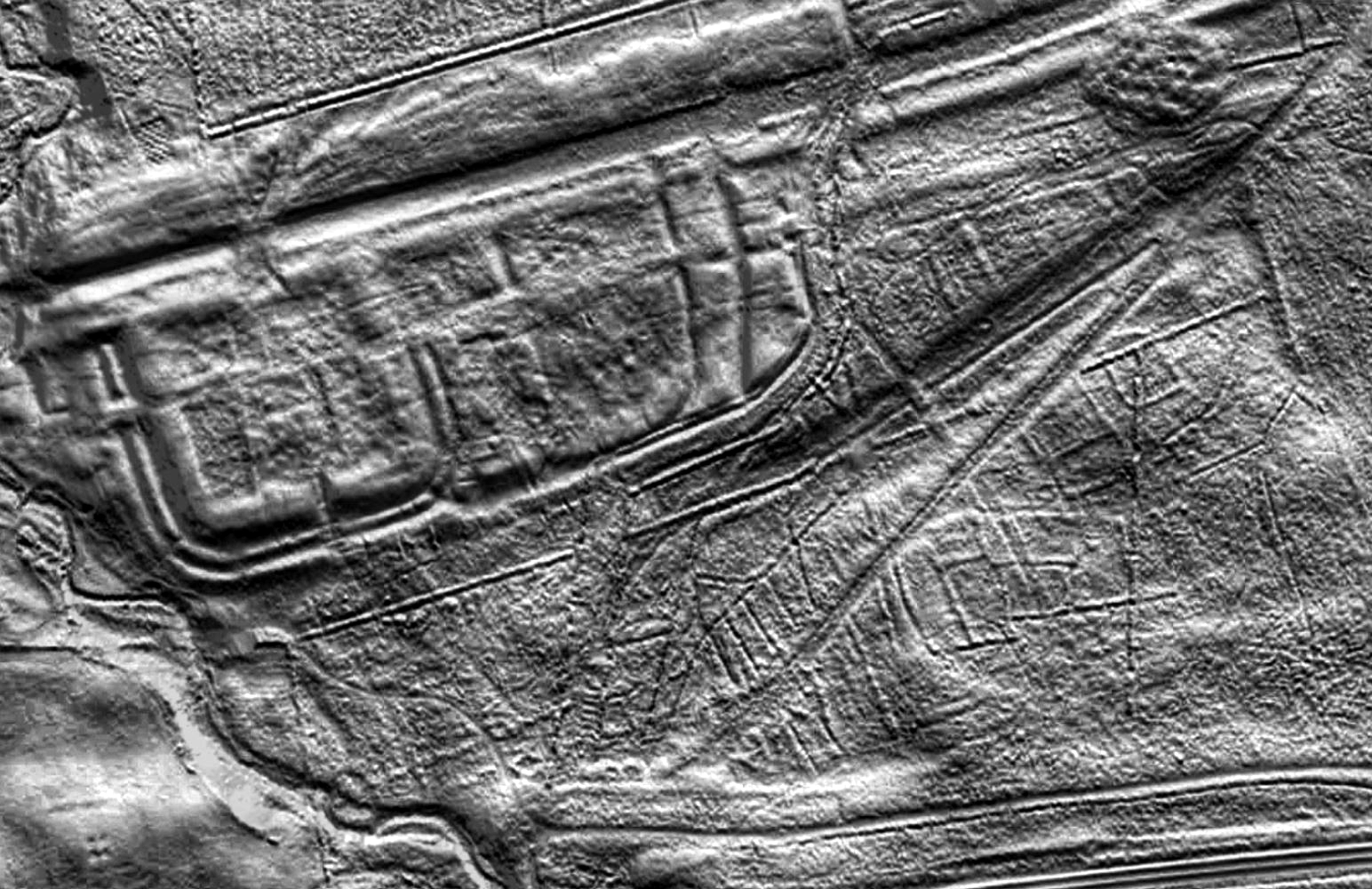
A lidar view of Rough Castle Roman fort on the Antonine Wall and associated field system in Falkirk, Scotland.

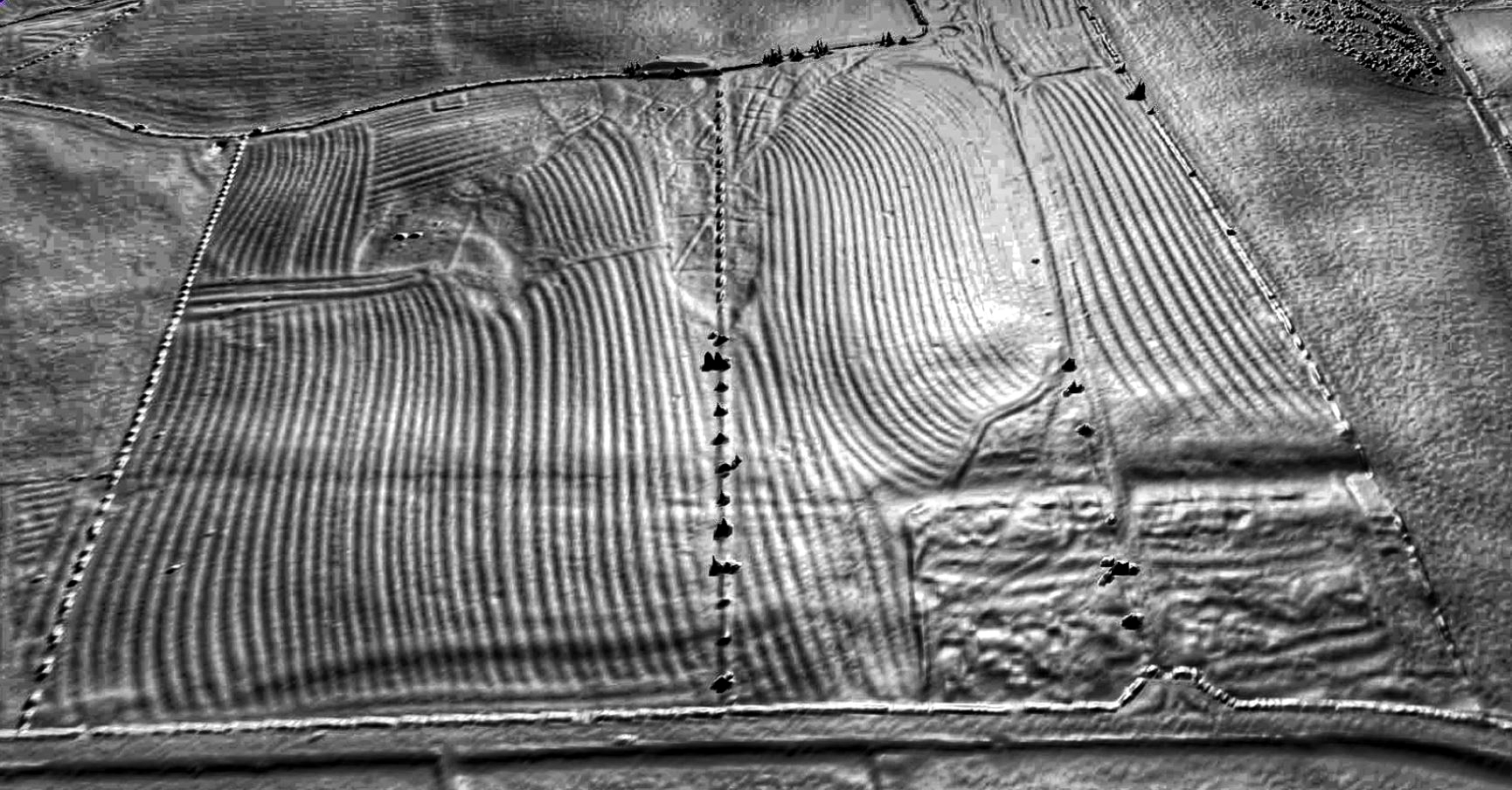
A lidar view looking southwards over Hadrian's Wall and Hunnum Roman fort to early reverse S-shaped ridge and furrow north of Halton, Northumberland Shrunken Medieval Village

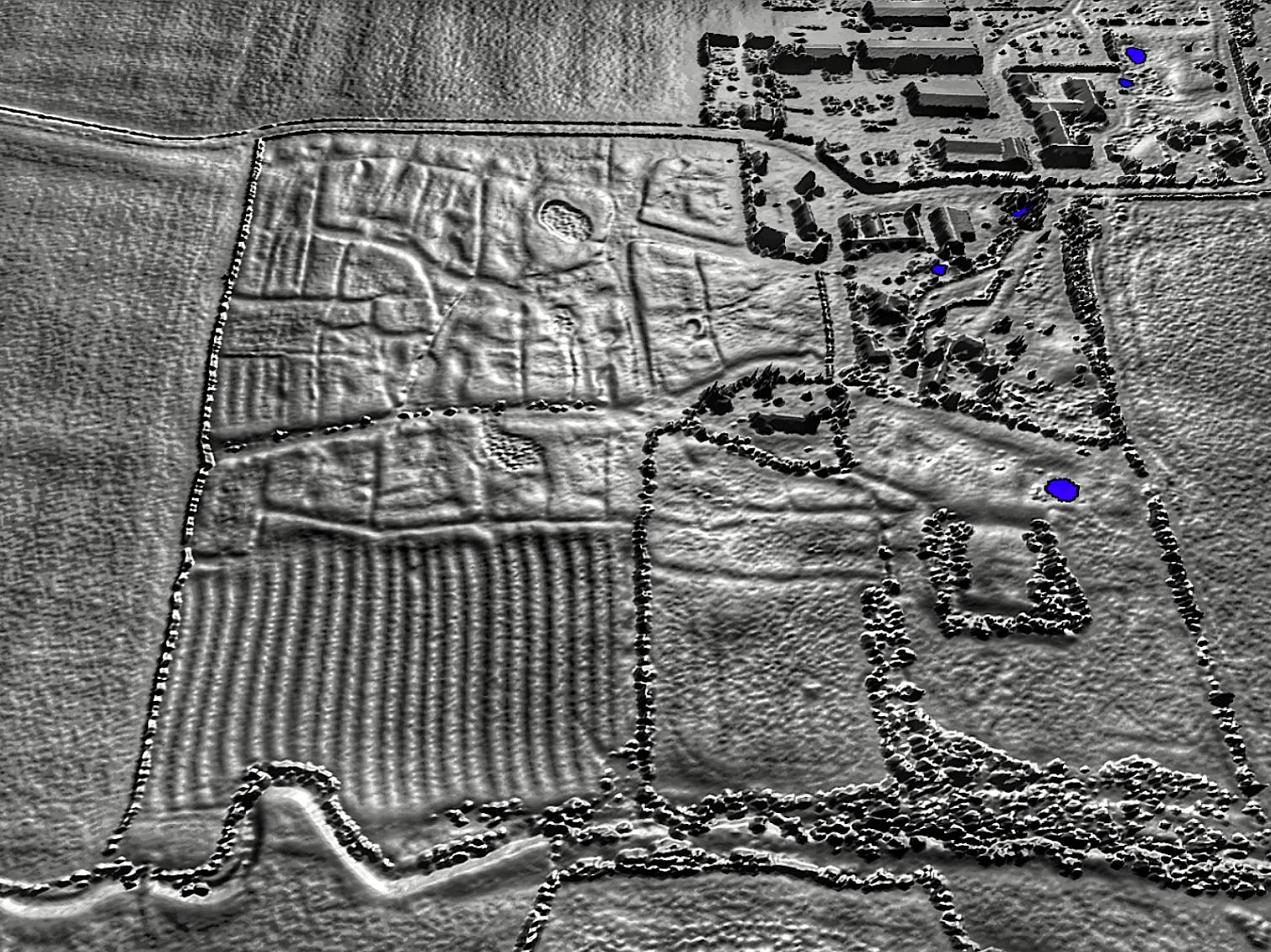
A lidar view of Rand medieval settlement with ridge and furrow in Lincolnshire

Although agriculture was practised earlier, the earliest recognisable field systems in England are neolithic. Cairnfields, which are pre-historic in date, are found in upland areas. They contain scattered stones and boulders and originated in surface clearance for agriculture.

So called Celtic fields can date from the Bronze Age through to the early Middle Ages. These fields are typically small and rectangular. They are frequently coaxial - that is they form a system in which the boundaries of adjacent fields make a series of long, roughly parallel lines. The extensive coaxial field systems established by the Romans are described as centuriation.

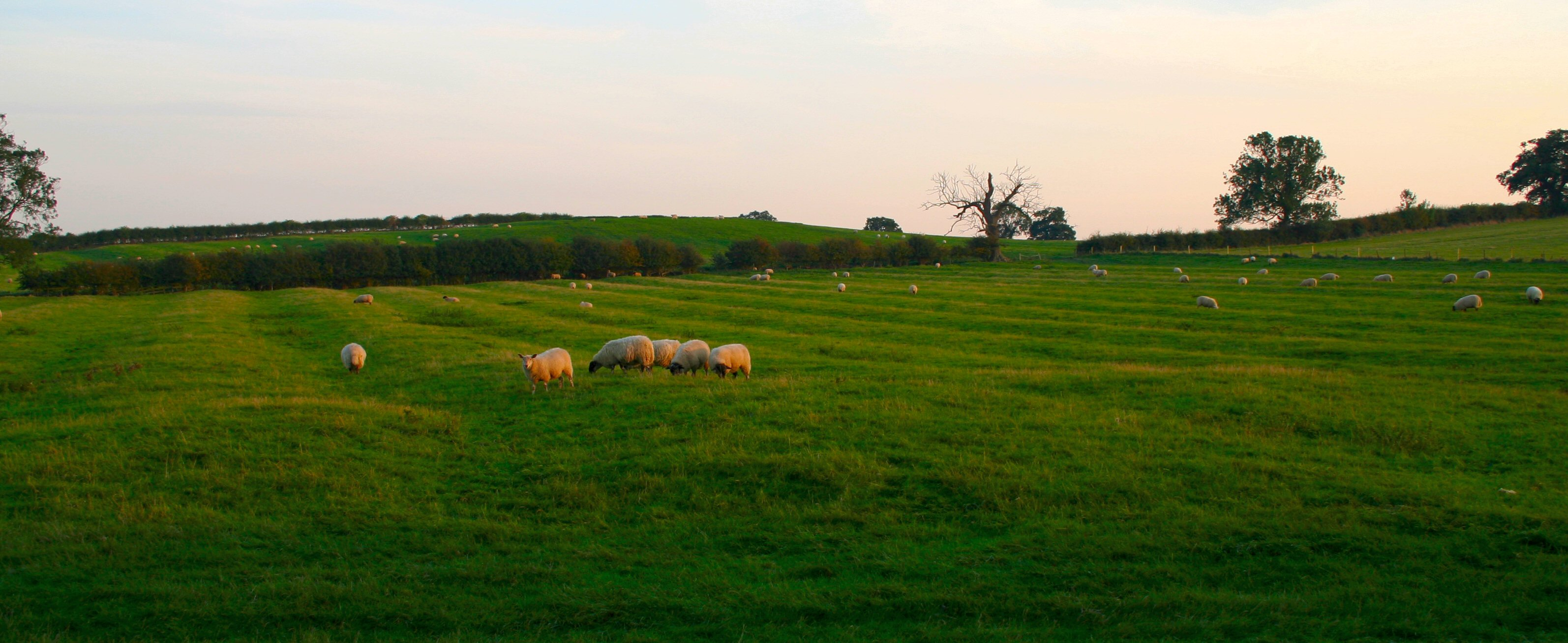
Ridge and Furrow in Grendon, Northamptonshire

Open fields were very large fields in which many individual farmers cultivated their own strips. These were a frequently found feature in the Midlands but less so in the South-east and West country. No documents survive which explain how and when the change to open fields took place, but signs of the change are apparent in some areas in the 8th, 9th or 10th centuries. The use of open fields began to decline in the 15th century. The landscape of open fields was frequently called "champion country".

In England, there was a significant rise in enclosure during the Tudor period. Enclosure was quite often undertaken unilaterally by the landowner, sometimes illegally. The widespread eviction of people from their lands resulted in the collapse of the open field system in those areas. The deprivations of the displaced workers has been seen by historians as a cause of subsequent social unrest.

Enclosure of open fields during the 18th and 19th century produced field systems with larger rectangular fields, often with blackthorn hedges. Adjacent areas were often enclosed at different times, leading to a change in orientation of the field systems between the two areas. The pattern of ridge and furrow will often reveal the layout of the original open fields.

In parts of England where enclosure took place early (or which were never enclosed), fields are often small and have an irregular shape, sometimes described as "pocket handkerchief".

Recent changes of agricultural practice are eliminating old field boundaries, particularly by removing hedges, to produce much larger fields reminiscent of traditional open fields.

=== Ireland ===
The most famous ancient field system in Ireland is the Céide Fields, an extensive series of stone walls dating back to 3500 BC. Similar stone wall field systems dating back to the Atlantic Bronze Age are visible in western Ireland and on the Aran Islands.

The primitive ard plough used in Gaelic Ireland only scratched the surface of the soil, so cross-ploughing was necessary to break up the earth better. This favoured square fields, so groups of square-shaped fields are likely to have been laid out in the pre-Norman period. The Normans brought the heavy plough to Ireland in the 12th century. This favoured long rectangular fields, so groups of fields with that shape are likely to postdate the Norman invasion of Ireland.

The open-field system ("champion system") predominated in medieval Ireland. In the better land of the eastern part of the island, a manorial system similar to that of the rest of Europe was practiced. Strips of land belonging to the village farmers lay in two or three enormous open fields, each cultivated with the same crop on an agreed cycle — typically a three-year cycle of cereal, then legume, then fallow.

In marginal land (especially the high-rainfall west of Ireland), the rundale system was used. The land was divided into discontinuous plots, and cultivated and occupied by a number of tenants to whom it is leased jointly. Houses were clustered in a clachán on the better land ("infield"), which was surrounded by mountainous or grazing land of lower quality ("outfield") where livestock (sheep, cattle) were grazed during summer or dry periods (booleying). Only the infield was fertilised with manure. The outfield might be used to grow oats after a few years of lying fallow.

The present system of fields in Ireland dates to the 17th–18th century onwards, with enclosure of land by ditches (stone-and-sod banks) and hedgerows (made of hawthorn, beech and sycamore), with a centrally located farmhouse and farmyard, being the hallmark of "improvement." Rapid population expansion prior to the Great Famine (1845–49) resulted in fragmentation of farms and fields. After the famine, continuous emigration resulted in consolidation or abandonment of fields. Relicts of these deserted villages and clacháns are still visible in the form of lazy beds and drystone walls.

The hedgerows that divide most of the fields of Ireland are estimated to run for over 830,000 km (520,000 mi) and cover a greater land area than forests or national parks.

=== Wales ===
Where early fields survive in Wales, most are associated with settlement features that indicate an Iron Age or Romano-British date. However buried soils as well peat pollen cores indicate earlier land-use of these areas and radiocarbon dates suggest a limited amount of woodland clearance as early as the Later Mesolithic

=== Canada ===
The field system of French settlers in Quebec along the St. Lawrence River was arranged in narrow plots extending away from the river, to allow houses along the river and relatively close together. See Seigneurial system of New France.

== Identifying former field systems ==
The boundaries of earlier field systems that have fallen out of use, can sometimes be deduced by studying earthworks (lumps and bumps), cropmarks or by using geophysics. Studying early maps will often show the field system in use at the time the map was prepared. From the mid 17th century, landowners began to commission estate maps that show the size and layout of the fields they own. However, for many English parishes, the earliest written evidence of their field system is from the enclosure maps or tithe maps. It is often possible to draw conclusions about relative age by looking at how field boundaries meet. Later boundaries will often abut, but not cross earlier boundaries.

== Drawing conclusions from analysis of field systems ==
Fields were organised for the convenience of the farmer - both arable and pastoral. Therefore, the size of fields often gives an indication of the type of agriculture and agricultural implements in use when they were established. The shape and orientation of collections of fields provides clues about the date they were established. Field systems can give an indication of land ownership and social structure. The extent to which the field system respects other features (or not) can be used as dating evidence for the other features or the field system itself. For example, a field system that doesn't respect a Roman road is likely to predate it. Similarly, a feature that respects medieval ridge and furrow is likely to post date it.

The Rodings (the largest group of parishes in England to bear a common name) was investigated by Steven Basset. Basset showed that a broadly rectilinear field system (and other features such as roads) continued across parish boundaries thus showing that the field system pre-dated the formation of parishes. He therefore concluded that they had originally been a single estate.

== See also ==
- History of agriculture
