= Belderrig =

Village in County Mayo, Ireland

Béal Deirg Belderg
- Village
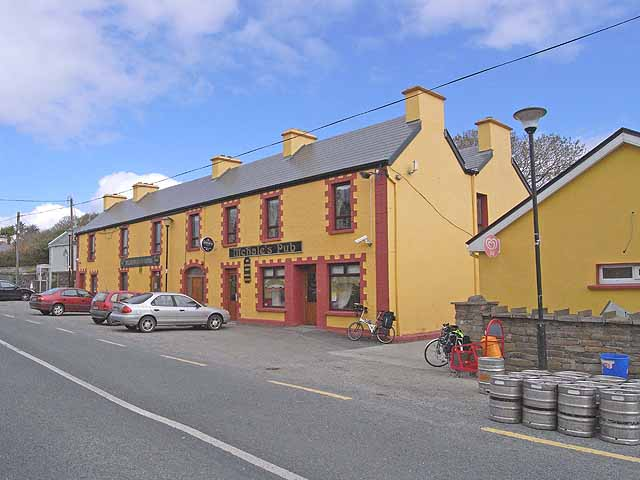
- Pub in Belderg

- Location in Ireland
- Coordinates: 54°18′00″N 9°33′00″W
- Country: Ireland
- Province: Connacht
- County: County Mayo
- Elevation: 93 m (305 ft)
- Irish Grid Reference: F991401
- Béal Deirg is the only official name. The anglicized spellings Belderg and Belderrig have no official status.

Béal Deirg (anglicized as Belderg or Belderrig) is a Gaeltacht village and townland in County Mayo, Ireland. At Belderrig Harbour there is a Mesolithic / Neolithic site dating to 4500-2500 cal. BC. The Céide Fields archaeological site lies about 6 km to the east of Belderrig.

== See also ==
- Behy court tomb, a megalithic tomb within the Céide Fields complex
- List of towns and villages in Ireland
