= Lynchet =

Earth terrace found on the side of a hill

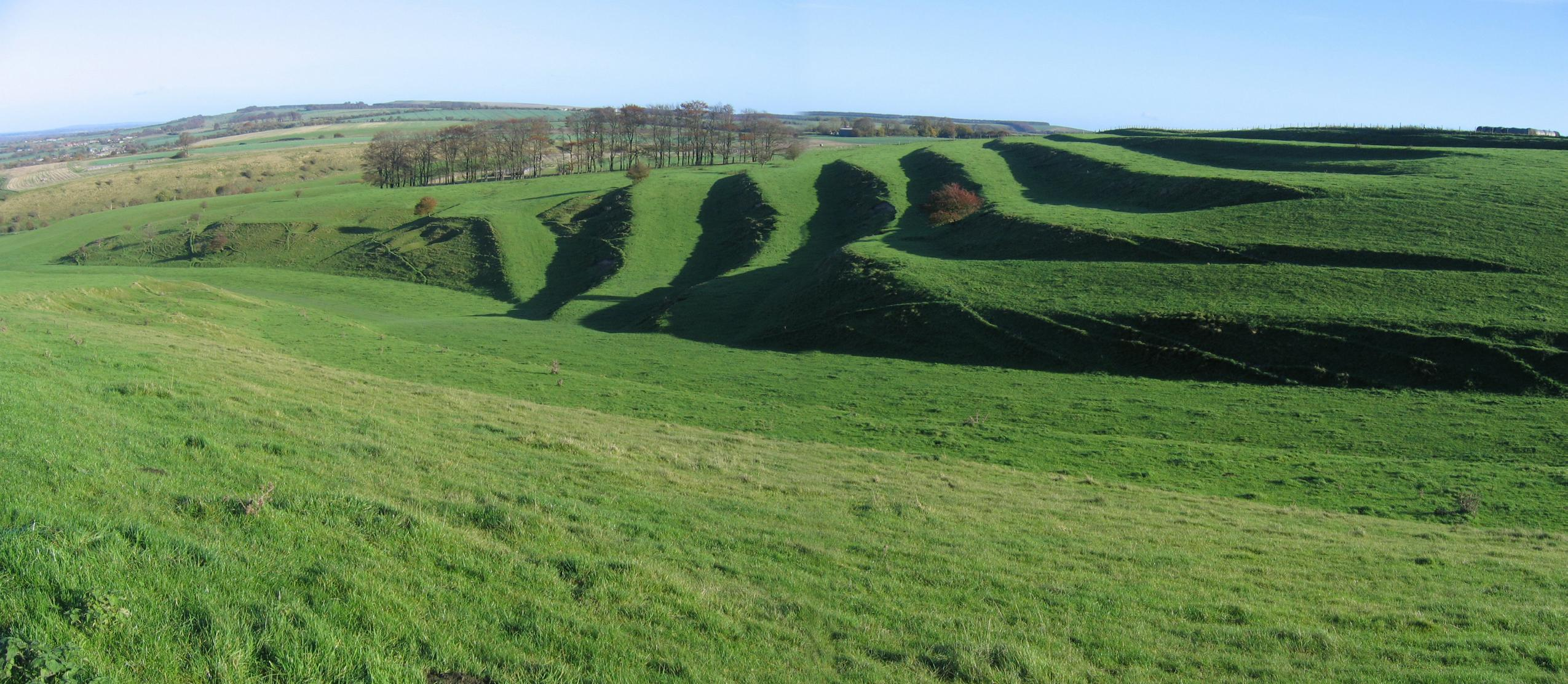
Lynchet system near Bishopstone in Wiltshire

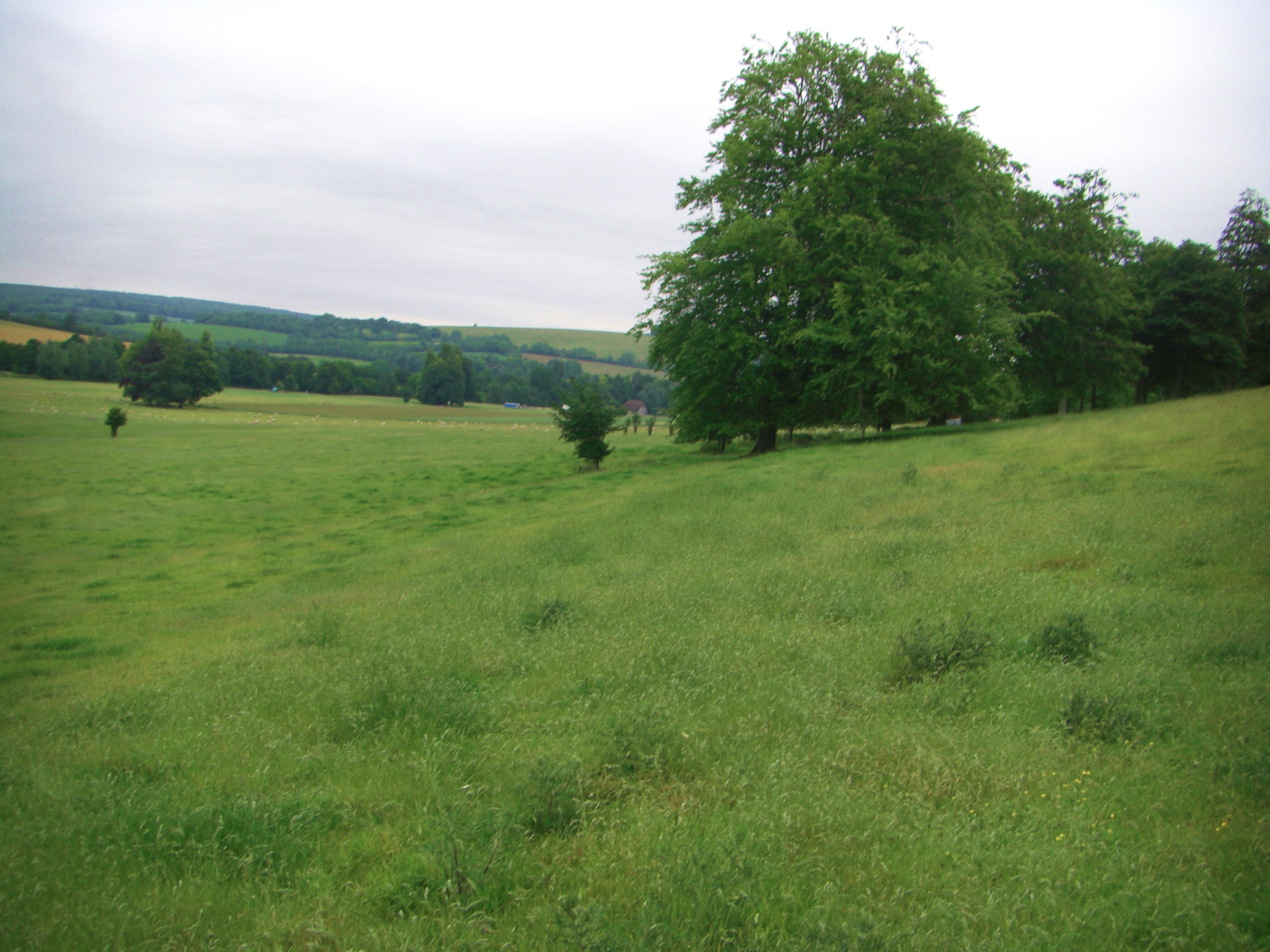
The slope of a prehistoric lynchet at West Dean, West Sussex

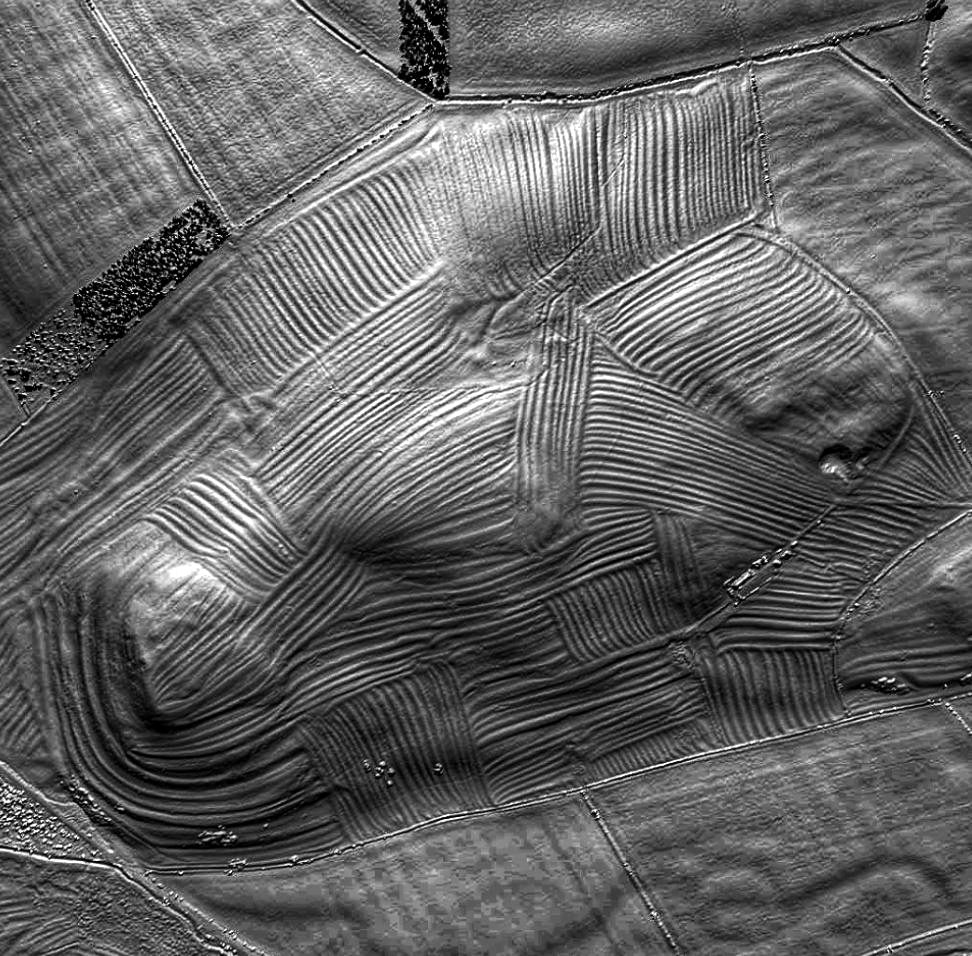
A lidar view of Medieval ridge and furrow and associated lynchets and strip lynchets at Heddon Hill in Northumberland

A lynchet or linchet is an earth terrace found on the side of a hill. Lynchets are a feature of ancient field systems of the British Isles. They are commonly found in vertical rows and more commonly referred to as "strip lynchets". Lynchets appear predominantly in Southern Britain and many are in areas close to Iron Age forts and other earthworks, including later Roman earthworks and earlier barrows from the Neolithic and Bronze Age periods. The size, location, spacing and number of rows of many strip lynchets indicates that many were man-made. It is most likely that lynchets were dug to maximise the use of land for agriculture, although they may have had other, ceremonial uses.

The word is the diminutive form of lynch, now rarely appearing in the English language, indicating an agricultural terrace; it is cognate with the golf links. However, both "lynchet" and "lynch" may also be used to refer to a strip of green land left between two pieces of ploughed land on non-sloping ground; or to a natural slope or terrace along the face of a chalk down.

The traditional theory on the formation of lynchets is that they may form naturally on the downslope of a field ploughed over a long period of time. The disturbed soil slips down the hillside to create a "positive lynchet" (where the new surface is higher than the original surface), while the area reduced in level becomes a "negative lynchet" (where the new surface is lower).

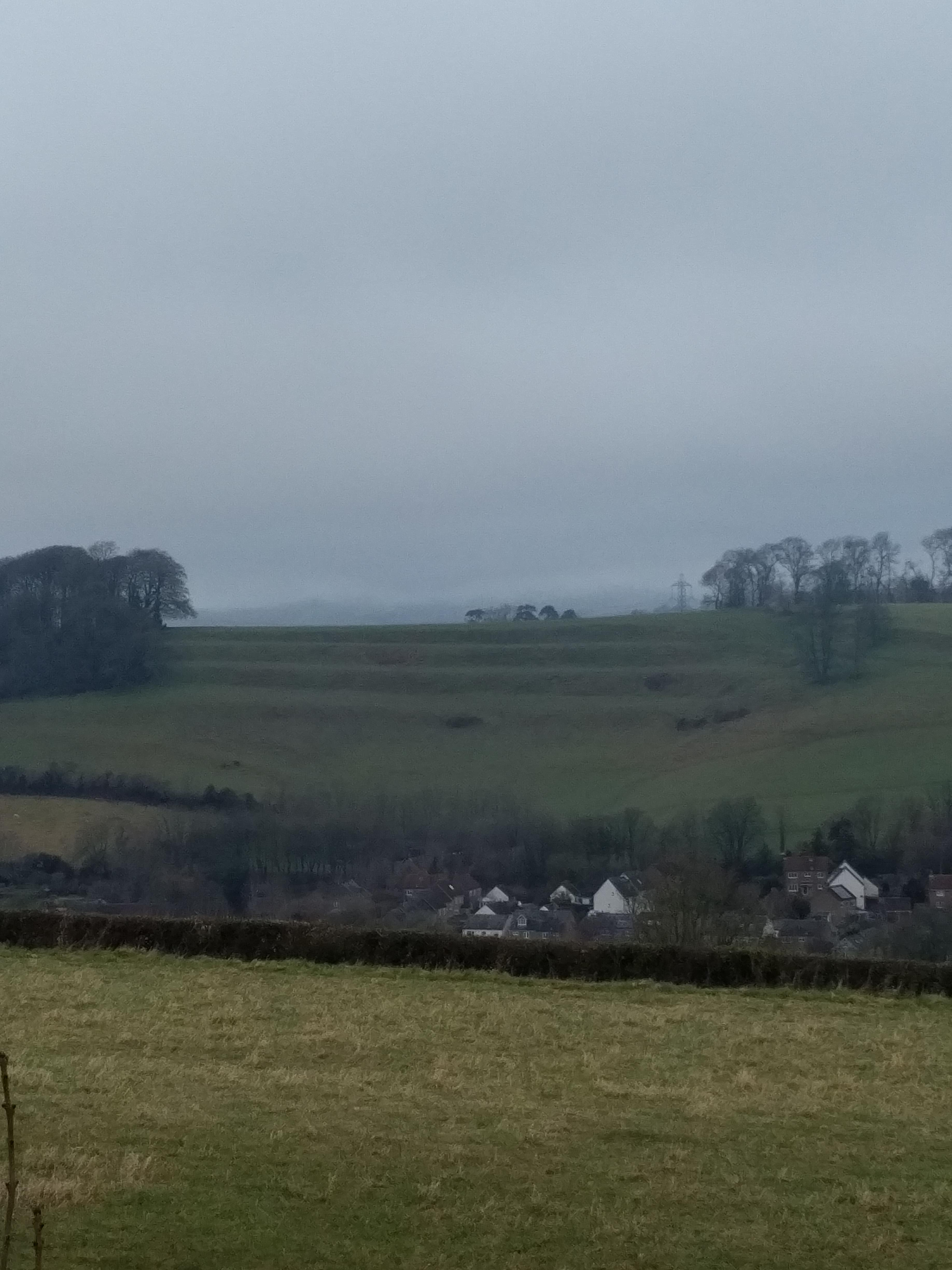
Lynchets above the village of Loders, Dorset

In Loders, Dorset, lynchets form a terraced band structure similar to an amphitheatre overlooking the village. Lynchets also form part of the conservation area of the neighbouring village of Uploders, where they apparently form old hillside field systems in close proximity to an Iron Age fort and hill-top barrows. 19th-century maps indicate that cider orchards were planted on some lynchets in that area.

== See also ==
- Ridge and furrow
- Céide Fields
- Lazy bed
- Cord rig
