= Behy court tomb =

Megalithic monument in Ireland

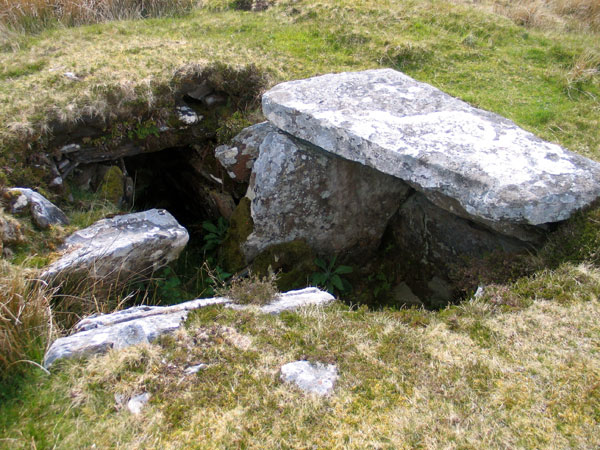
- The chamber of the court tomb in 2011
- Interactive map of Behy court tomb
- 54°18′15.48″N 9°27′45.49″W
- Location: County Mayo, Ireland

History
- Built: c. 3500 BC

Site notes
- Material: Stone

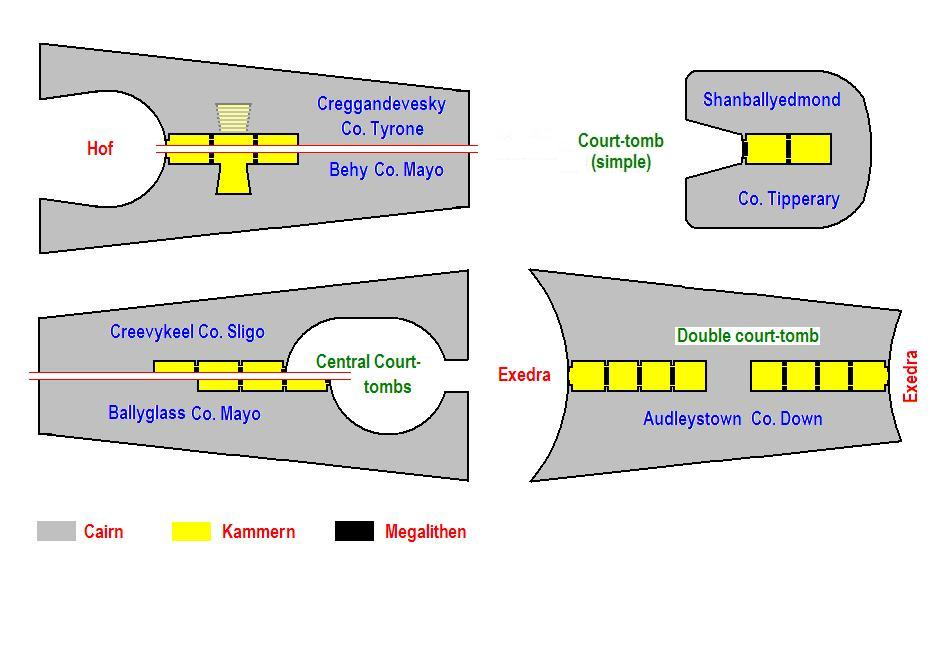
Various forms of court tombs. The form of the court tomb of Behy is pictured on the top left.

The court tomb of Behy is a megalithic monument in the townland of the same name (Irish: An Bheithigh, meaning 'birch land'), near Belderrig in the north of County Mayo, Ireland. The monument is located within the Céide Fields complex, 150 meters above sea level on the slope of Maumakeogh hill, and is the most westerly of the thirty or so tombs in the Killala group. The site commands wide views across the sea to the north and to the Stags of Broadhaven. The monument is located 500 meters west of the Céide Fields Visitor Centre and is on private property.

The chamber of the monument, which is buried beneath an envelope of peat, was long known to local turf cutters, and the site was named in folk tradition as the "Roomeens". The sunken chamber had been used as a still house for the manufacture of poteen. The monument first came to the attention of archaeologists when it was surveyed by Rúaidhrí de Valéra and Sean Ó Nualláin of the Archaeological Section of the Ordnance Survey in 1952. The monument was initially classed as a passage grave because of the cruciform chamber; this assessment was revised after a second survey in 1959.

== Exacavations ==
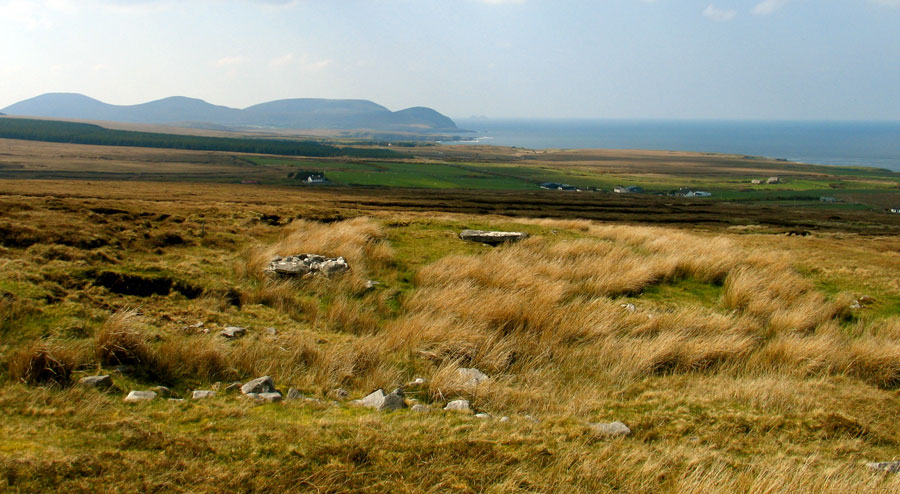
The Behy court tomb looking west across Broadhaven Bay. The capstone of the chamber is visible; however, the majority of the monument is buried beneath a layer of peat.

The chamber and court of the tomb was excavated in 1963 and 1964, led by Rúaidhrí de Valéra, Michael Herity, and Sean Ó Nualláin with a team of students from University College Dublin, which included Seamus Caulfield. The excavations revealed a trapezoidal cairn 28.5 meters long, 10.5 meters wide at the court and 6.5 meters wide at the western end. The cairn is bounded by a wall constructed of drystone masonry instead of kerb of boulders which would be more typical of this type of monument. The drystone wall also enclosed an oval court measuring 7.5 meters by 5 meters. The entrance to the transeptal or cruciform chamber, which is oriented to the east, is blocked by a tall sill-stone. The excavated portion of the monument has since been largely covered up again with peat.

The cruciform main chamber and the antechamber of the court tomb of Behy are very large. The entrance to the chamber had been deliberately blocked up with dry stone masonry. Above the 2 meter high chamber lie two capstones. The floor in the side chambers is paved. A range of early Neolithic pottery and lithic artefacts were found during the excavation to include a small polished axe, two flint lance points and chert scrapers.

A pre-bog stone wall adjoins the cairn, and the excavators noted that a wall crossed the monument, indicating that the wall post-dated the Neolithic tomb, and that the material used to construct the wall may have been quarried from the cairn.

"Before excavation a stone 'fence' was noted in the cutaway bog running eastwards and westwards from the tomb and built on the mineral soil beneath the bog. The excavation showed that the fence or wall was built after the cairn of stones of the tomb had collapsed and therefore had to be later than the construction of the tomb but because the 'fence' underlay the peat, fundamental stratigraphical observation made it clear that the 'fence' had to be older than the initial growth of the bog."

== Discussion ==
Court tombs are considered to be a specific type of chamber tomb found principally in Scotland and Ireland. More than 400 examples are known in Ulster, Connacht, and the southwest of Scotland. Behy is an unusual court tomb with features not typically found in monuments of this class. The two side-chambered transepted gallery resembles the cruciform chamber of a passage grave.

The court tomb of Behy lies within the Céide Fields complex, but the pre-bog walls surrounding the monument do not respect the sanctity cairn, which was presumably considered a sacred space. This is atypical for a megalithic site and indicates that the pre-bog walls, which are claimed by Seamus Caulfield to date from the Neolithic, in fact post-date the monument.

The drywall material, which borders the obliquely set court at the entrance to the tomb, is unusual. In typical court tombs this role is taken by orthostats. It is possible that other court tombs once had drywall masonry, but as this is easier to remove than heavy orthostats it has been lost while the court orthostats have survived.

== See also ==
- Court cairn
- Irish megalithic tombs
