= Ridge and furrow =

Archaeological pattern of ridges and troughs

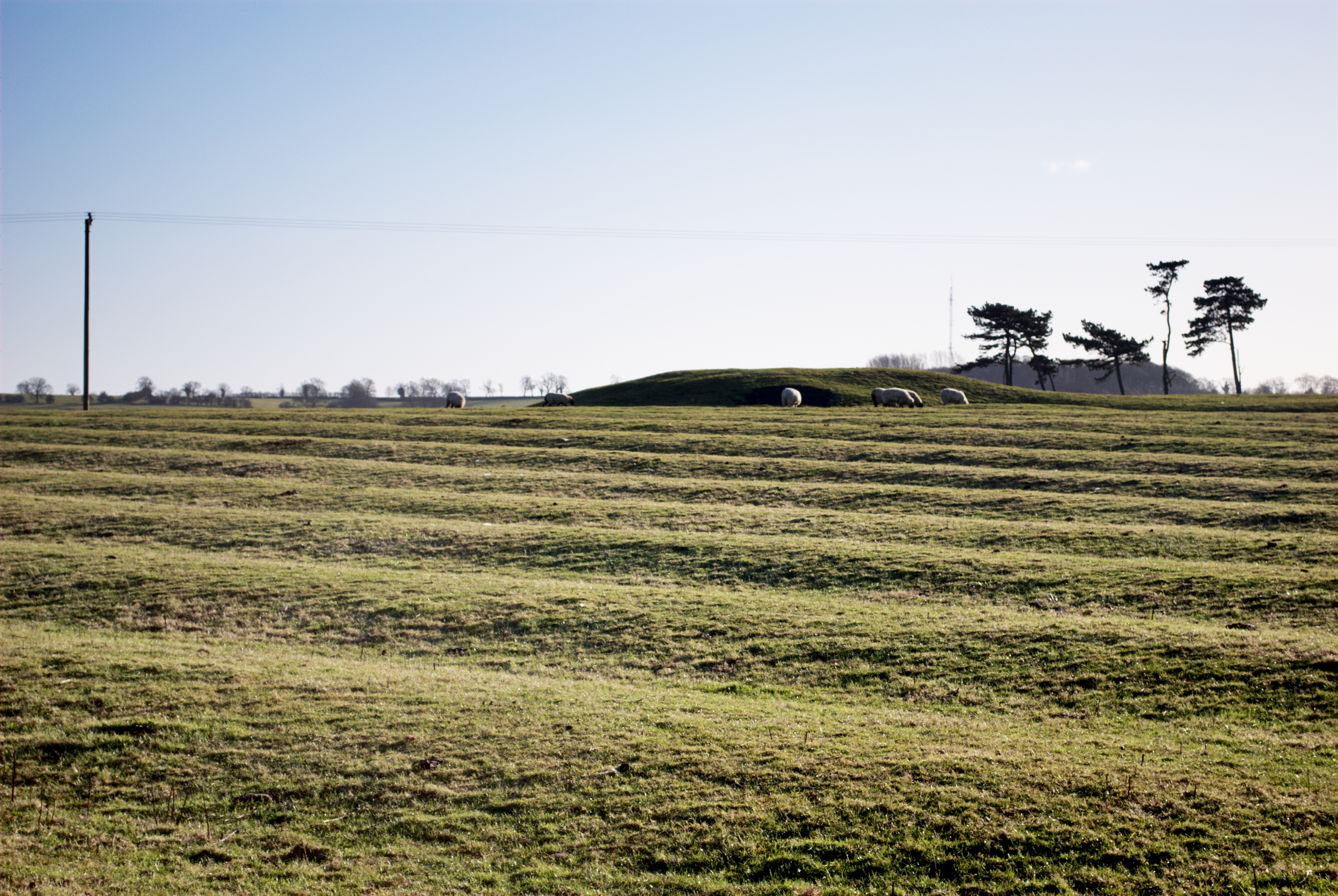
Ridge and furrow in Cold Newton, Leicestershire

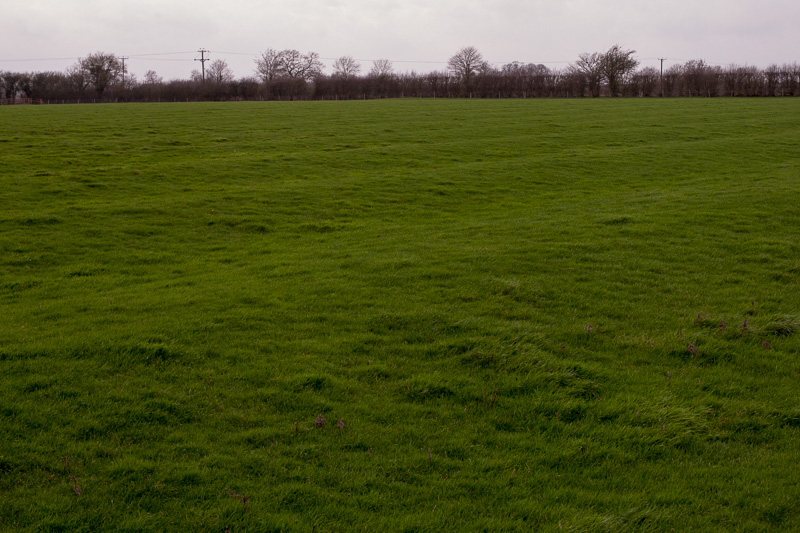
Ridge and furrow in Stony Stratford, Buckinghamshire

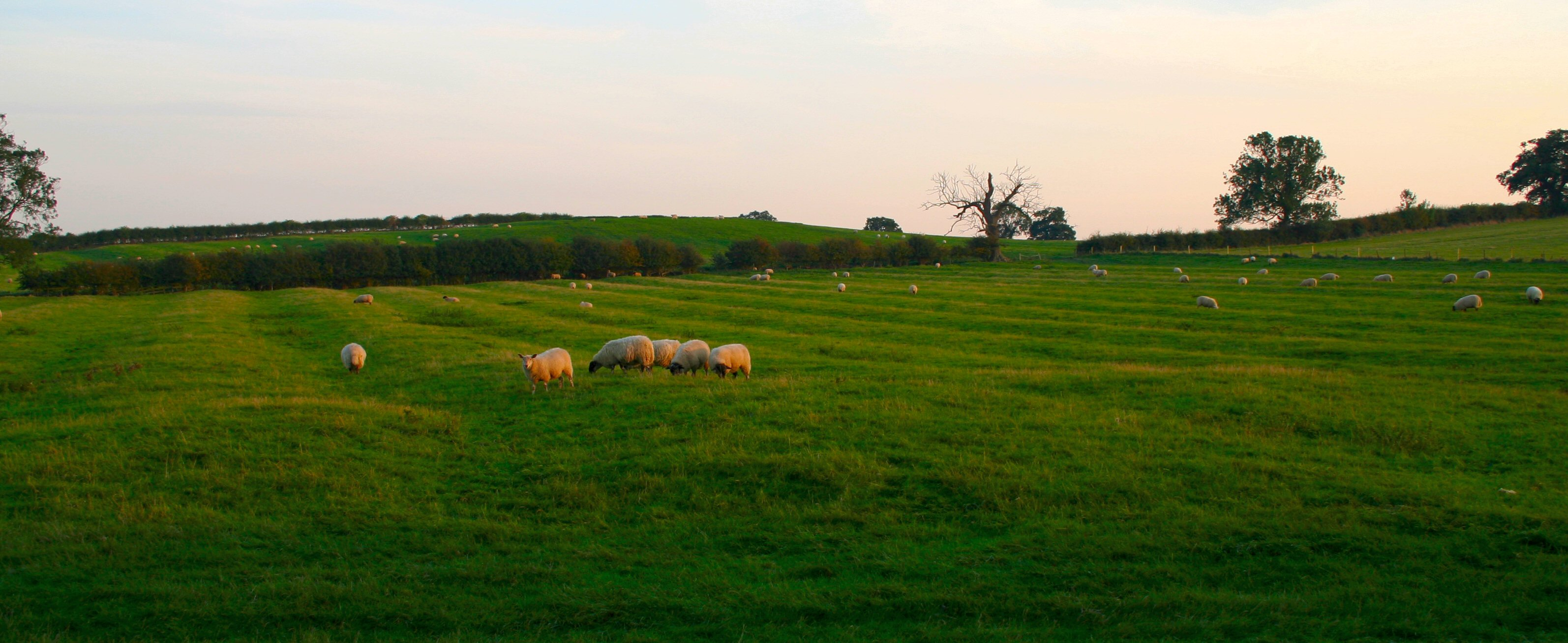
Ridge and furrow in Grendon, Northamptonshire

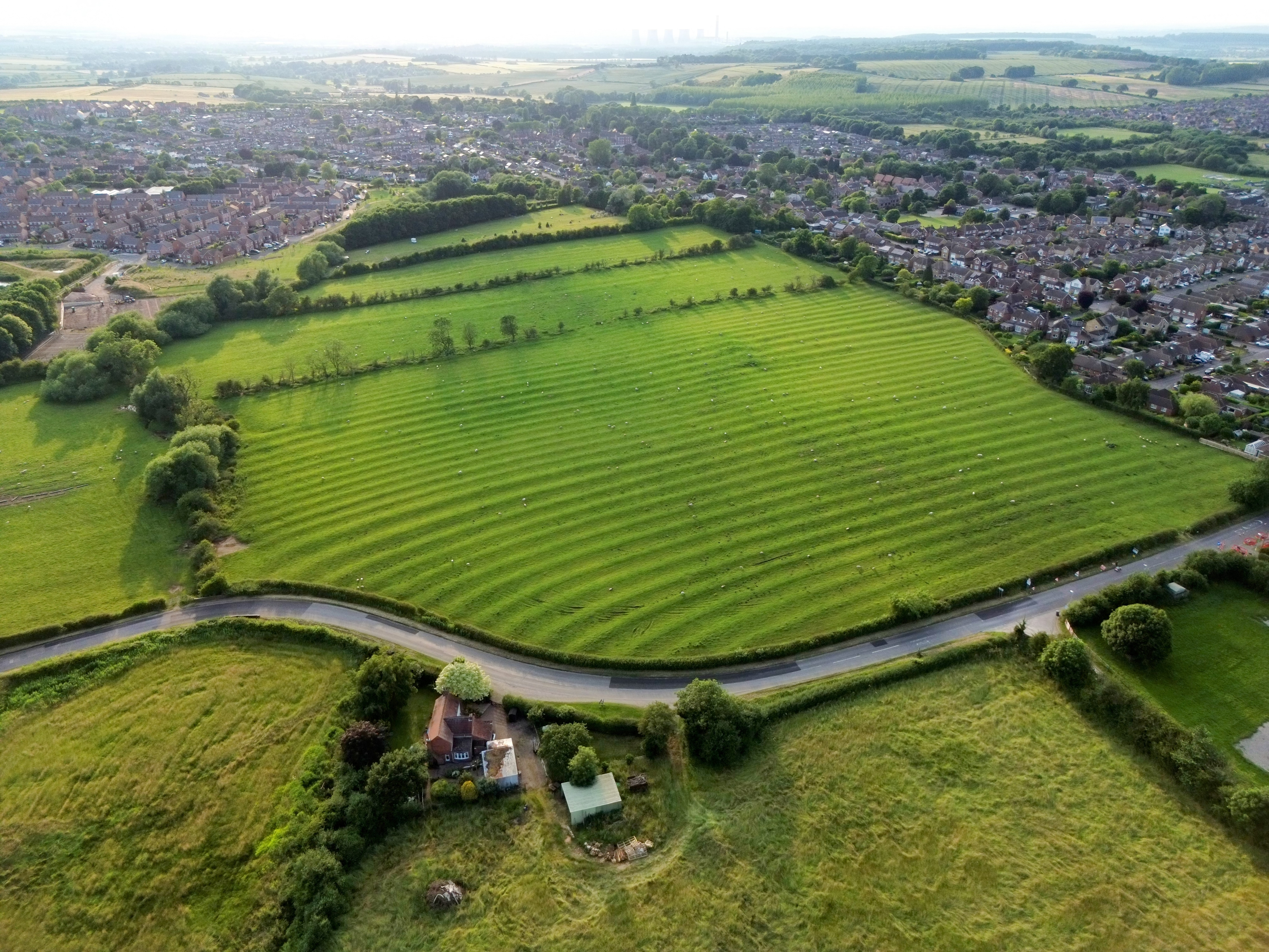
Ridge and Furrow, in East Leake, Nottinghamshire

Ridge and furrow is an archaeological pattern of ridges (Medieval Latin: sliones) and troughs created by a system of ploughing used in Europe during the Middle Ages, typical of the open-field system. It is also known as rig (or rigg) and furrow, mostly in the North East of England and in Scotland.

The earliest examples date to the immediate post-Roman period and the system was used until the 17th century in some areas, as long as the open-field system survived. Surviving ridge and furrow topography is found in Great Britain, Ireland and elsewhere in Europe. The surviving ridges are parallel, ranging from 3 to 22 yards (3 to 20 m) apart and up to 24 inches (61 cm) tall—they were much taller when in use. Older examples are often curved.

Ridge and furrow topography was a result of ploughing with non-reversible ploughs on the same strip of land each year. It is visible on land that was ploughed in the Middle Ages, but which has not been ploughed since then. No actively ploughed ridge and furrow survives.

The ridges or lands became units in landholding, in assessing the work of the plougher and in reaping in autumn.

== Origin ==
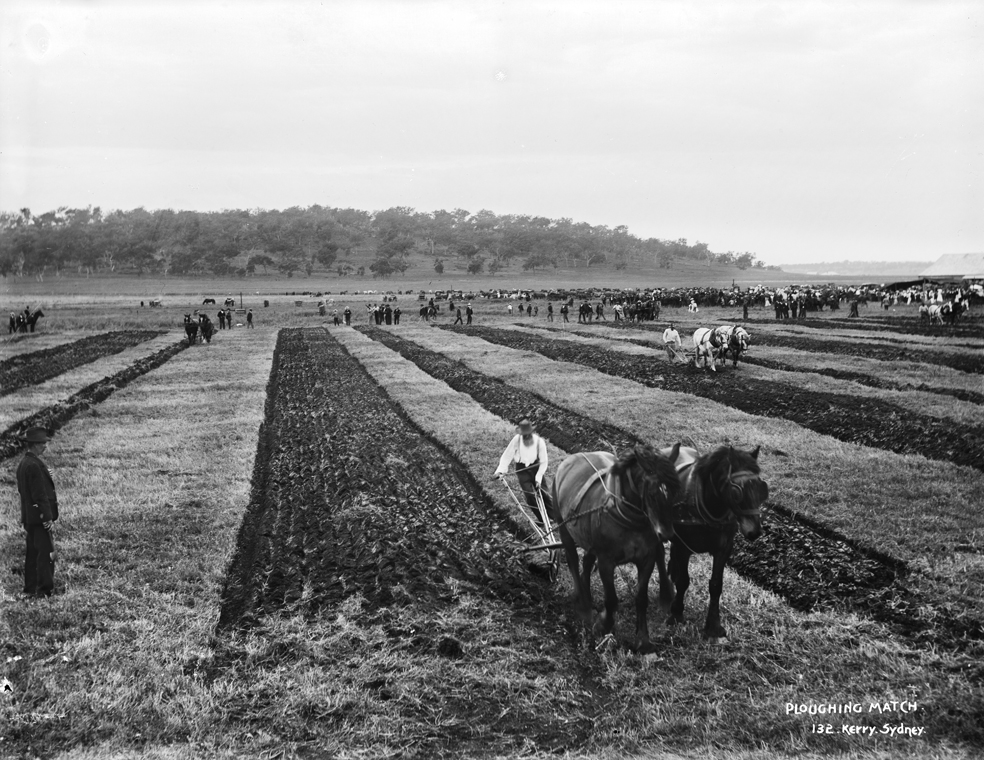
Ploughing with a single-sided plough in a ploughing match, showing furrows heaped towards centre of strip (The different strips will eventually meet). This is not yet ridge and furrow, as the strip has only been ploughed once in this location.

Traditional ploughs have the ploughshare and mould-board on the right, and so turn the soil over to the right. This means that the plough cannot return along the same line for the next furrow. Instead, ploughing is done in a clockwise direction around a long rectangular strip (a land). After ploughing one of the long sides of the strip, the plough is removed from the ground at the end of the field, moved across the unploughed headland (the short end of the strip), then put back in the ground to work back down the other long side of the strip. The width of the ploughed strip is fairly narrow, to avoid having to drag the plough too far across the headland. This process has the effect of moving the soil in each half of the strip one furrow's width towards the centre line each time the field is ploughed.

In the Middle Ages each strip was managed by one family, within large open fields held in common, and the locations of the strips were the same each year. The movement of soil year after year gradually built the centre of each strip up into a ridge, leaving a dip, or "furrow" between each ridge (this use of "furrow" is different from that for the small furrow left by each pass of the plough). The building up of a ridge was called filling or gathering, and was sometimes done before ploughing began. The raised ridges offered better drainage in a wet climate: moisture drained into the furrows, and since the ridges were laid down a slope, in a sloping field water would collect in a ditch at the bottom. Only on some well-drained soils were the fields left flat. In damper soil towards the base of the ridge, pulses (peas or beans) or dredge (a mixture of oats and barley) might be sown where wheat would have become waterlogged, as Thomas Tusser suggested in the 16th century:

For wheat till land
Where water doth stand.
Sow pease or dredge
below in that redge.

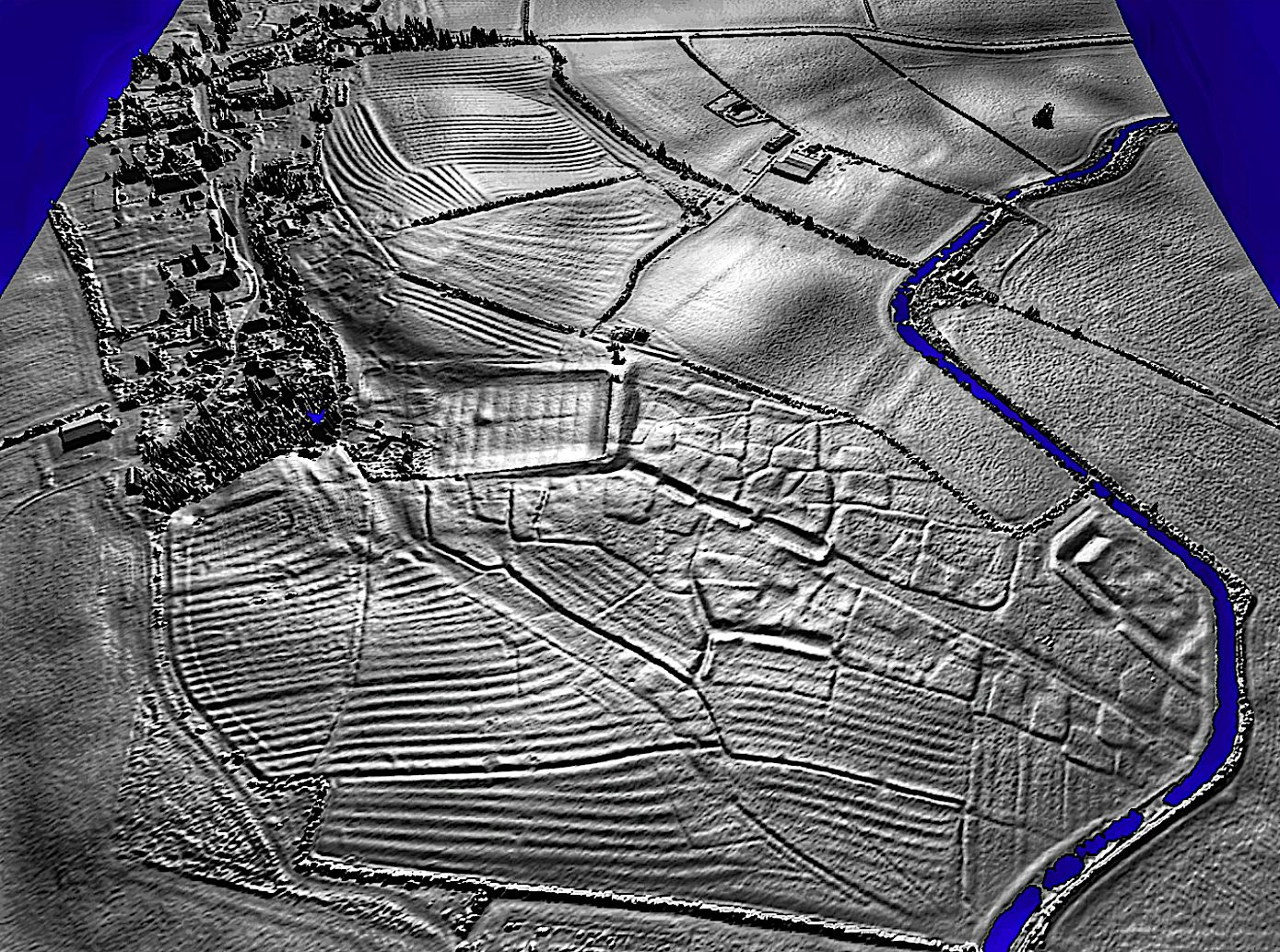
A lidar view of the site of Wormleighton village in Warwickshire

The dip often marked the boundary between plots. Although they varied, strips would traditionally be a furlong (a "furrow-long") in length, (220 yards, about 200 metres), and from about 5 yards (4.6 m) up to a chain wide (22 yards, about 20 metres), giving an area of from 0.25 to 1 acre (0.1 to 0.4 ha).

In most places ploughing continued over the centuries, and later methods (especially the reversible plough) removed the ridge and furrow pattern. However, in some cases the land became grassland, and where this has not been ploughed since, the pattern has often been preserved. Surviving ridge and furrow may have a height difference of 18 to 24 inches (0.5 to 0.6 m) in places, and gives a strongly rippled effect to the landscape. When in active use, the height difference was even more, over 6 feet (1.8 m) in places.

== Curved strips ==
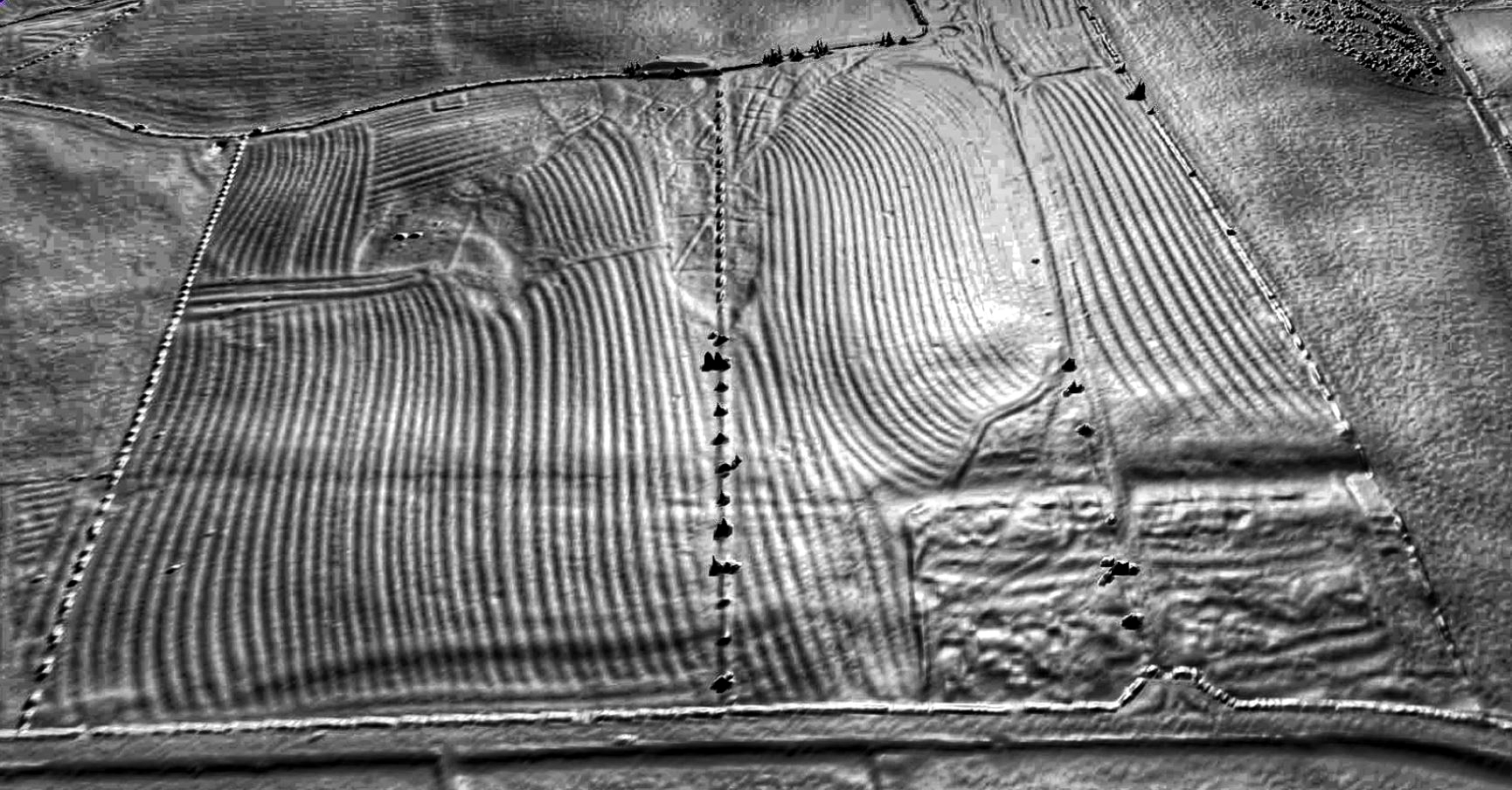
An oblique lidar view of the site of Hunnum Roman fort and immediate landscape to the south (north of Halton SMV) with early ridge and furrow in Northumberland

In the early Middle Ages ploughing was done with large teams of small oxen (commonly eight oxen in four pairs), and the plough itself was a large, mainly wooden implement. The team and plough together were therefore many yards long, and this led to a particular effect in ridge and furrow fields. When reaching the end of the furrow, the leading oxen met the end first, and were turned left along the headland, while the plough continued as long as possible in the furrow (the strongest oxen were yoked at the back, and could draw the plough on their own for this short distance). By the time the plough eventually reached the end, the oxen were standing lined up facing leftwards along the headland. Each pair was then turned around to walk rightwards along the headland, crossing the end of the strip, and they then started down the opposite furrow. By the time the plough itself reached the beginning of the furrow, the oxen were already lined up ready to pull it forwards.

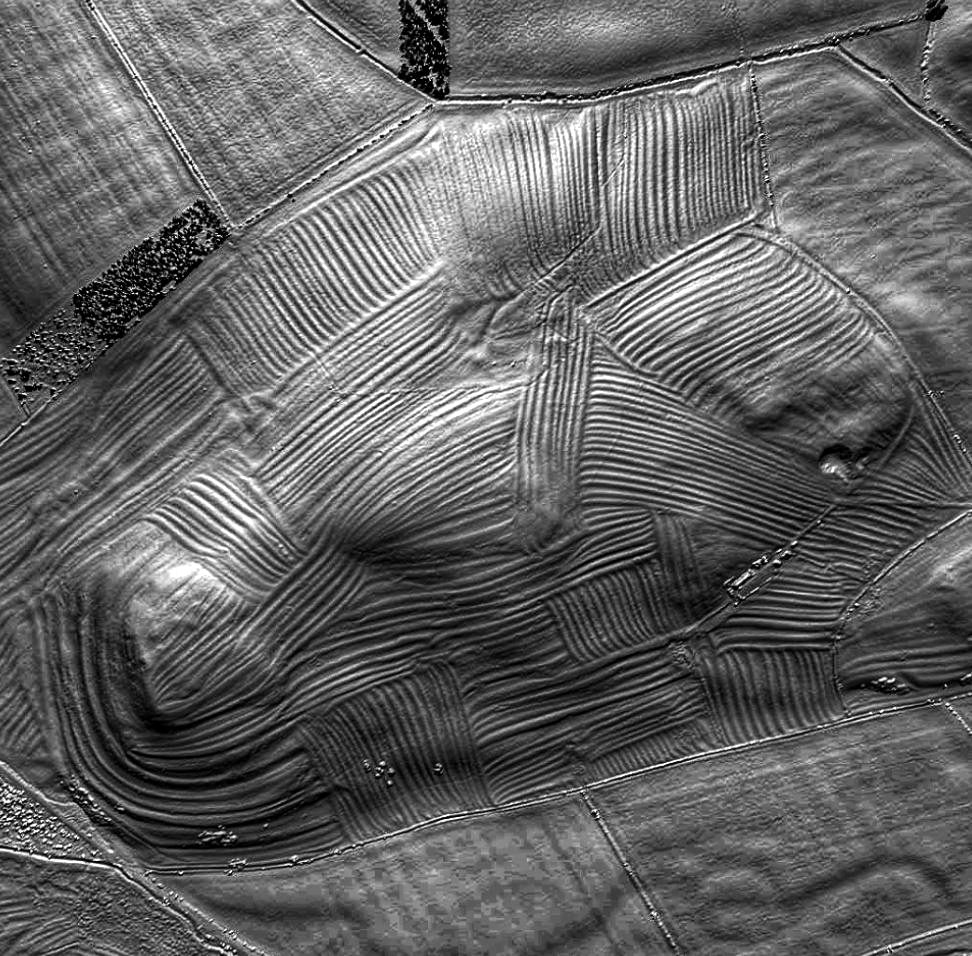
A lidar view of medieval ridge and furrow and associated lynchets and strip lynchets at Heddon Hill in Northumberland

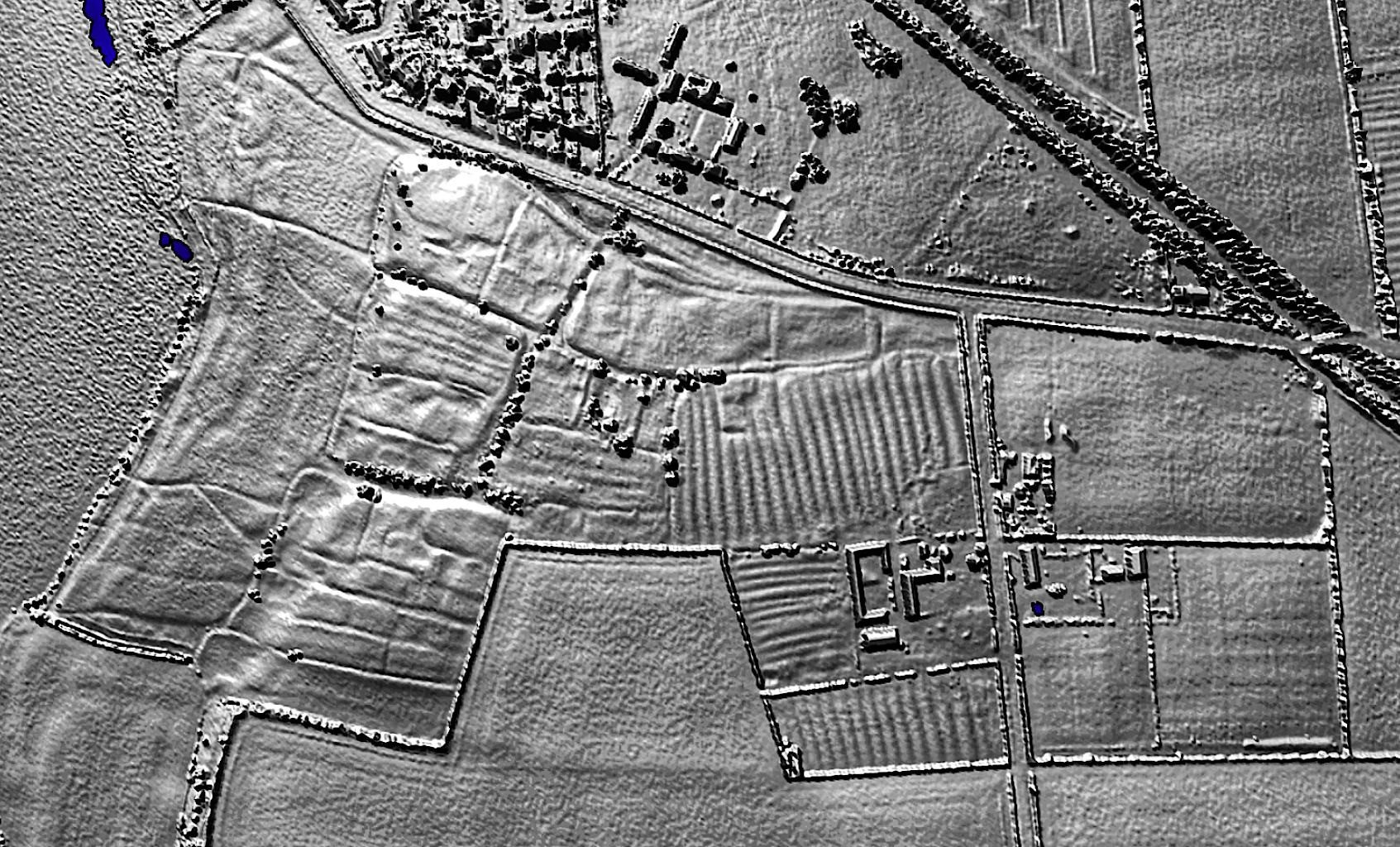
A lidar view of Southorpe Deserted Medieval Village in Hornsea, Yorkshire

The result of this was to twist the end of each furrow slightly to the left, making these earlier ridge and furrows into a slight reverse-S shape. This shape survives in some places as curved field boundaries, even where the ridge and furrow pattern itself has vanished.

If the oxen had been turned right at the end of the furrow, they would immediately have had to turn right again down the returning furrow, making the line of oxen cut across the top of the ploughed strip and thus pulling the plough out of the ground before it reached the end of the furrow, as well as having potential difficulty from two adjacent lines of oxen moving in opposite directions. Alternatively, if lined up rightwards along the headland, some would already be past the beginning of the new furrow, and these would have to be moved awkwardly sideways into the furrow to be ready to plough. Turning to the left made one turn at a time and avoided a sideways move.

As oxen became larger and ploughs more efficient, smaller teams were needed. These took less room on the headland, and straight ploughing became easier—and easier still when heavy horses were introduced. Late Middle Ages ridge and furrow is therefore straight.

== Surviving locations ==
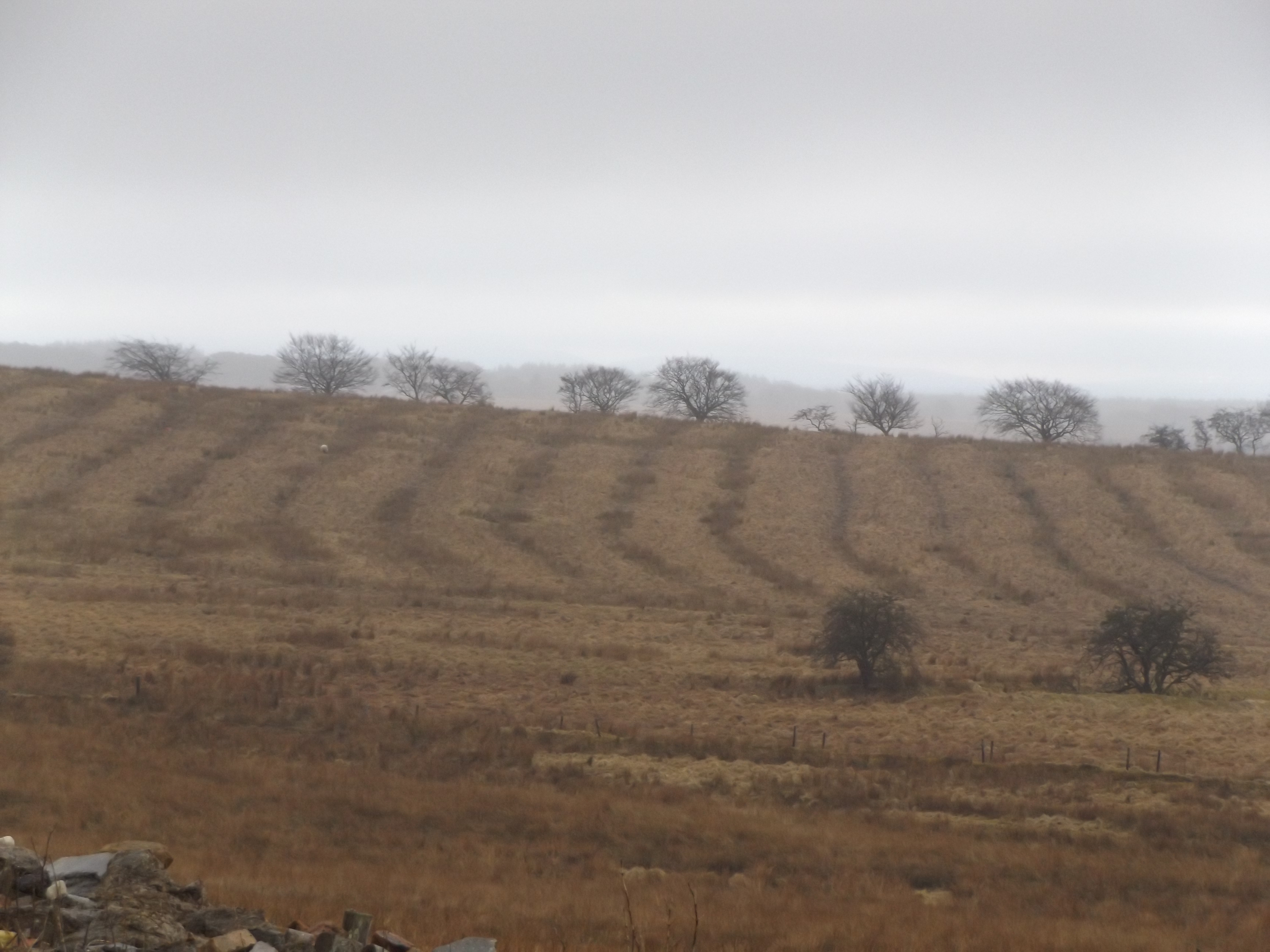
Rig and furrow at Roughrig reservoir, near Airdrie, North Lanarkshire in Scotland

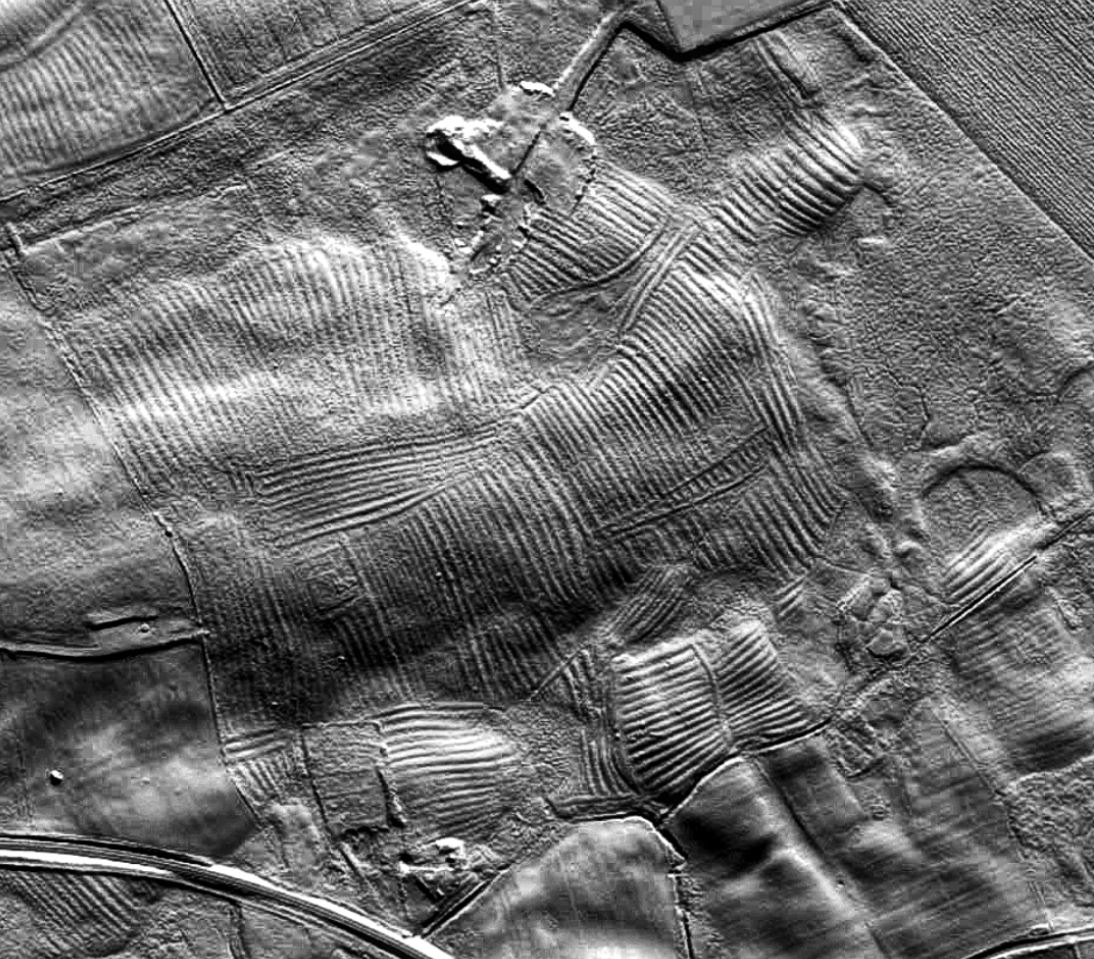
A lidar view of rig and furrow at Armadale, West Lothian in Scotland

Ridge and furrow often survives on higher ground where the arable land was subsequently turned over to sheep walk in the 15th century and has not been ploughed out since by modern ploughing methods, today surviving still as pasture and grazing for sheep where the effect is clearly visible, especially when the sun is low or after a dusting of snow. It is often associated with deserted medieval villages.

Some of the best-preserved ridge and furrow survives in the English counties of:

- Buckinghamshire
- Cambridgeshire
- County Durham
- Derbyshire
- Gloucestershire
- Lincolnshire
- Leicestershire
- Northamptonshire
- Nottinghamshire
- Northumberland
- Oxfordshire
- Warwickshire
- West Yorkshire

In Scotland, 4,600 acres of rig and furrow survive in one area outside the town of Airdrie.

== Similar agricultural landforms ==
- Cord rig, cultivation ridges created by spade digging
- Lazy beds, cultivation ridges created by spade digging
- Lynchets, sloping terraces on steep hillsides, created by gravity on hillslopes subject to ploughing
- Raised bed gardening, a modern system of raising cultivated land above the surrounding ground
- Run rig and rundale, Scottish and Irish land-use patterns named after their characteristic ridges and furrows
- Water-meadows, grassland with ridges and dips to control irrigation—superficially similar to ridge and furrow, but the origin, pattern and use were very different
