= Cord rig =

System of cultivation practised in Britain

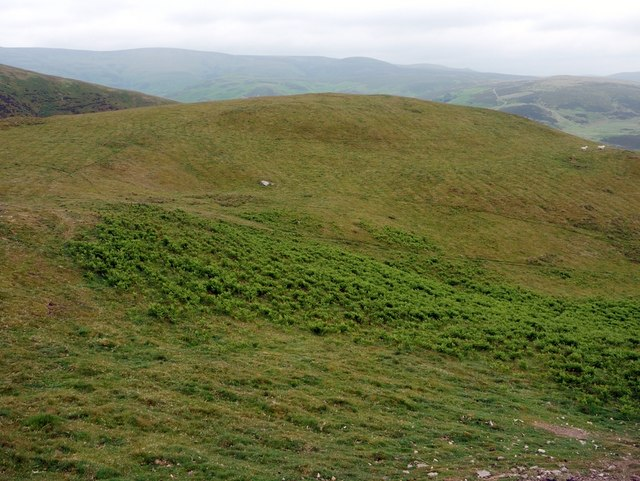
Parallel lines of cord rig cultivation are clearly visible in the foreground and on the flanks of Scowther Knowe, in the Cheviot Hills.

Cord rig is the name given by archaeologists to a system of cultivation practised in prehistoric and later upland Britain.

Spades were used to excavate raised banks for cultivation with channels running alongside for drainage. Where it survives, it consists of parallel ridges of earth around 1 m wide and 0.15 m high. The ridges are separated by shallow furrows in fields of around 0.5 hectares, or about 1 acre (4,000 m^{2}). The presence of cord rig suggests nearby settlements and can be identified from aerial photography.

In Northumberland, one example of cord rig has been identified running beneath, and therefore predating, Hadrian's Wall.

== See also ==
- Celtic fields
- Lazy bed
- Run rig
