= Lazy bed =

Traditional method of arable cultivation

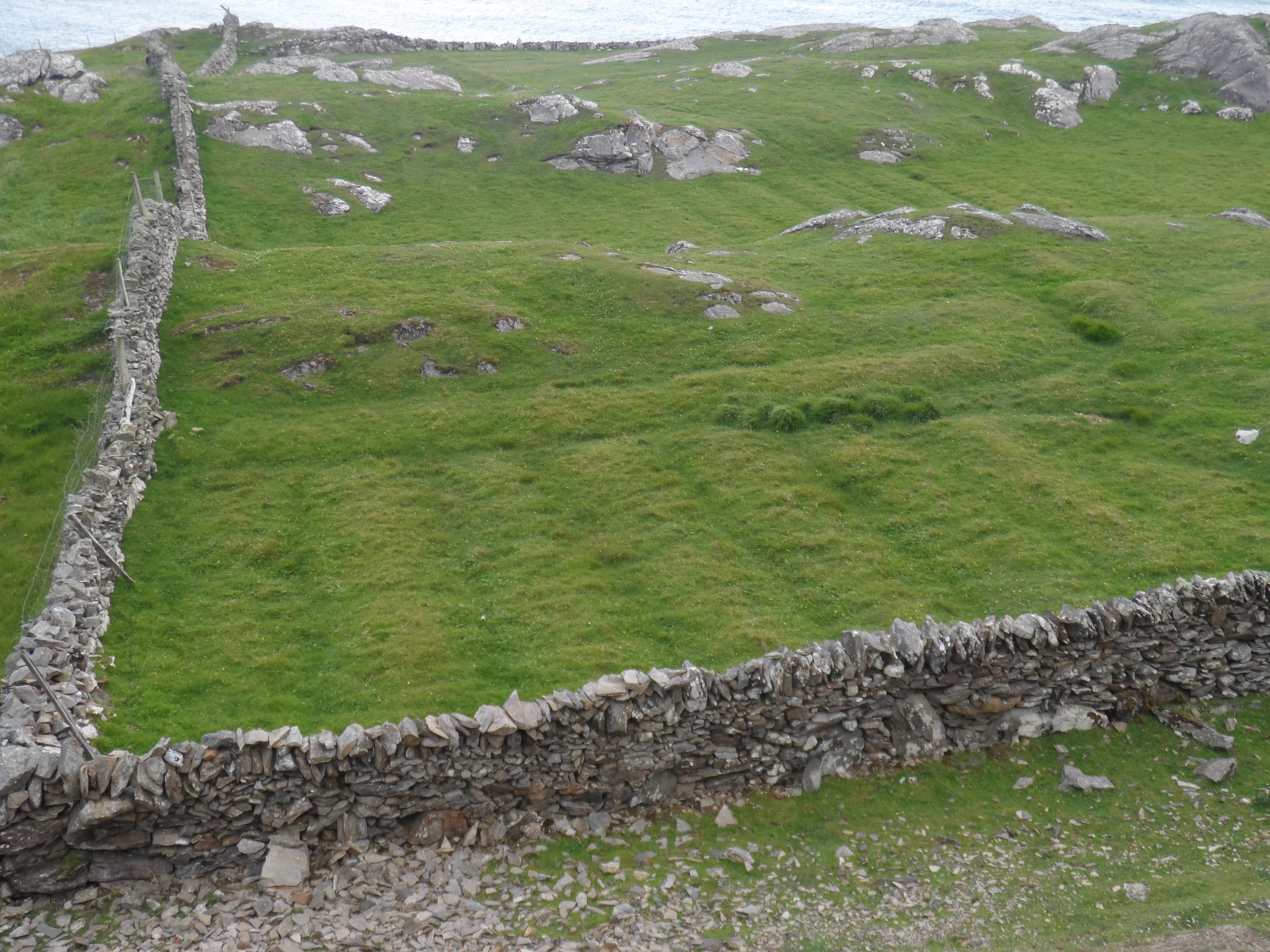
Lazy beds, Inishbofin

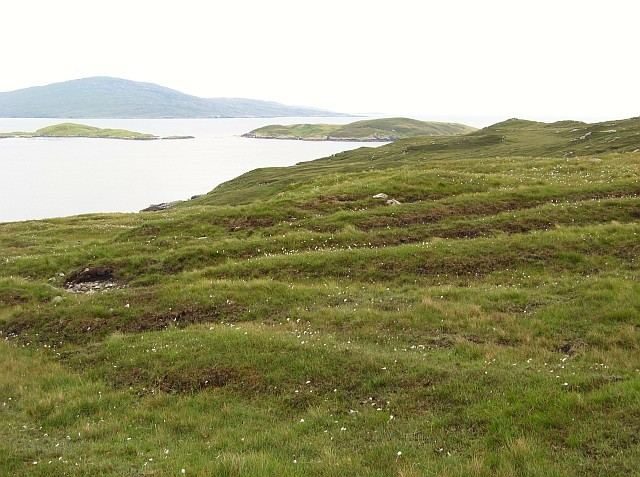
Old lazybeds on North Harris

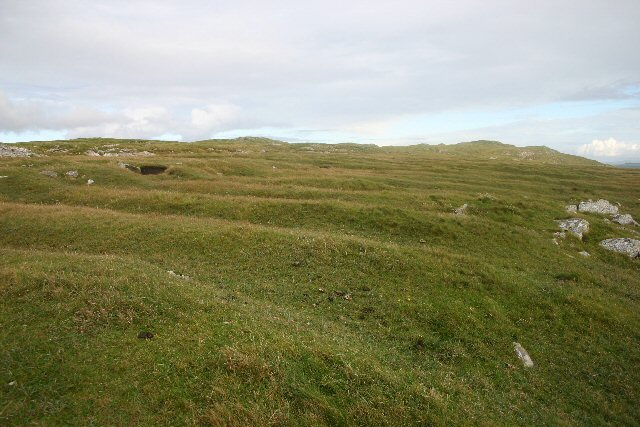
Old lazybeds on Ensay

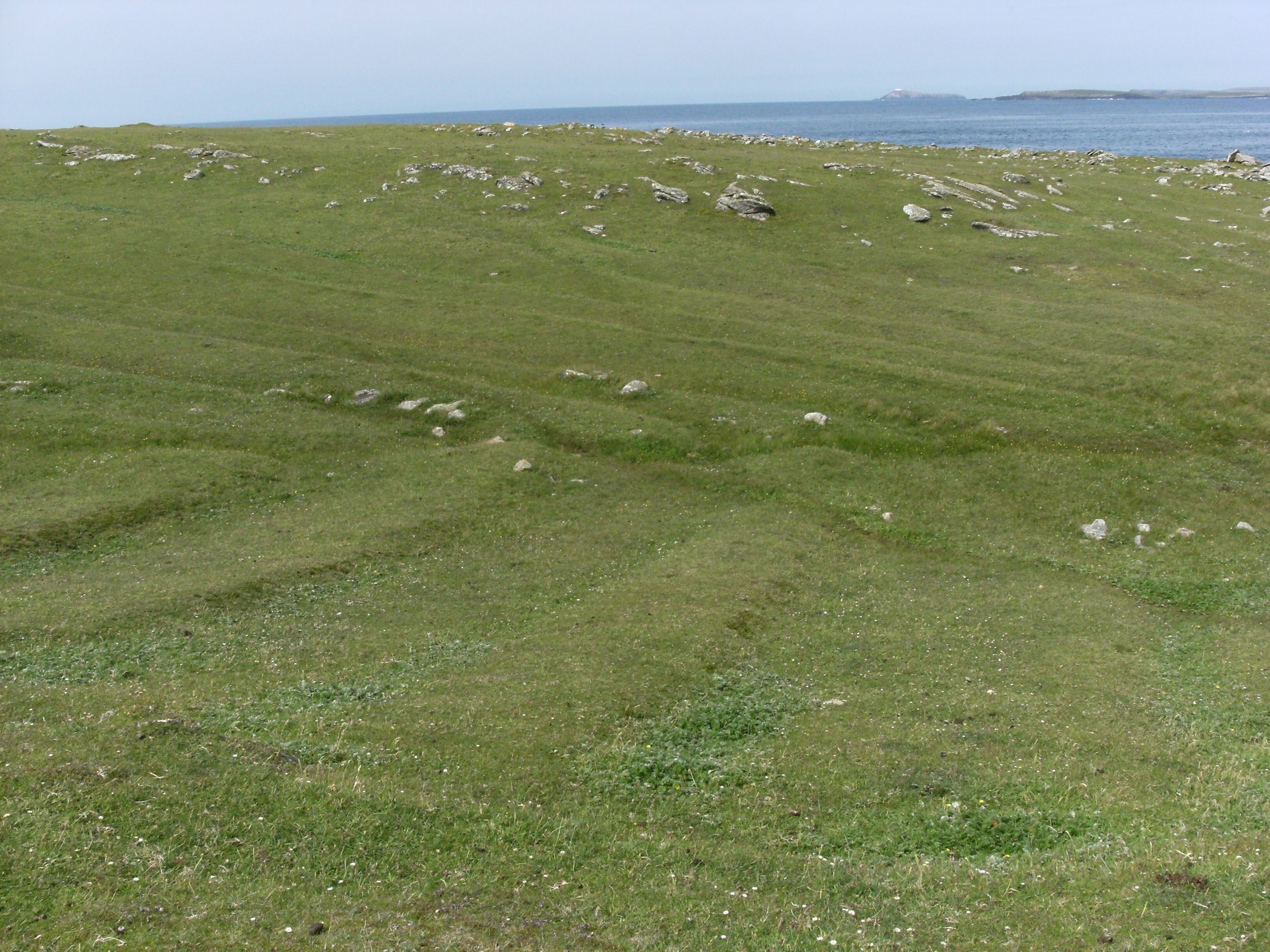
Lazybeds on Inishglora

Lazy bed (Irish: ainneor or iompú; Scottish Gaelic: feannagan [ˈfjan̪ˠakən]; Faroese: letivelta) is a traditional method of arable cultivation, often used for potatoes. Rather like cord rig cultivation, parallel banks of ridge and furrow are dug by spade although lazy beds have banks that are bigger, up to 2.5 metres (8 ft 2 in) in width, with narrow drainage channels between them. The 1874 Canadian Farmer's Manual of Agriculture notes:

A common mode practised in Ireland, and in some parts of the north and west of England and Scotland, is that known as the lazy-bed fashion, which consists in planting the sets in beds of a few feet in width, covered from trenches formed with the spade.

In addition to Ireland, England, and Scotland, the practice has been documented in Newfoundland, St. Pierre, the Faroe Islands, the Swiss Alps, Devon, Orkney, and the Isle of Man. One early-20th-century critique of the practise suggests it could lead to overcrowding of plantings. Another critic wrote that the "system is too laborious and expensive to adopt except in wet districts." In the Hebrides and the west of Ireland, the method used is normally to lift up sods of peat and apply desalinated seaweed fertiliser to improve the ground. In Newfoundland, lazy beds were augmented with seaweed, a process which continues into the early 21st century:

One method of applying seaweed is to spread it on a bed and cover it with soil from the trench. This method sometimes referred to as the 'lazy bed' system works well, especially in areas where the soil is shallow and drainage is poor.

== History ==
The name of the practice may derive from “lazy root”, an English nickname for the potato that was often grown in lazy beds. An early 20th-century observer in Connemara noted that the "term 'Lazybed' would seem to be a misnomer, for, in fact, the system calls for a great deal of labour."

Exact origins of the practice are uncertain. There is archaeological evidence of lazy-bed type cultivation at a Romano-British settlement at Cottenham in Cambridgeshire, with similarly-narrow ridges resembling lazy-beds, dating to circa 600 BC, found in Holland, others in Norway, and on a Viking Age site in Denmark.

In Ireland, there is archeological evidence that Celtic farmers grew crops in lazy beds long before the potato. By the late eighteenth century, highland Scotland, Wales and most rural gardens in England's west country also spaded their potatoes into beds.

Lazy beds have been identified in archaeological contexts from 17th and 18th century farms in Clydesdale, and have also been uncovered as part of archaeological excavations in Newfoundland.

A rare 1757 copy of "Plain Directions for Raising Potatoes on the Lazy Bed" by John Fraser is held by the National Library of Scotland. Historically, lazy beds were reported in Orkney by 1795, by 1801 in Cavan, and by 1808, the practice had "taken great root" in Devonshire. The abandonment of the method may have exacerbated the later Great Famine in Ireland. Following the Famine, it was one of the practices suggested for the reutilization of reclaimable wastelands.

== See also ==
- Run rig
- Foot plough

== Bibliography ==
- Mann, Charles C. (2011). 1493: Uncovering the New World Columbus Created. Alfred A. Knopf. ISBN 978-0-307-26572-2.
