= Run rig =

Scottish system of land tenure

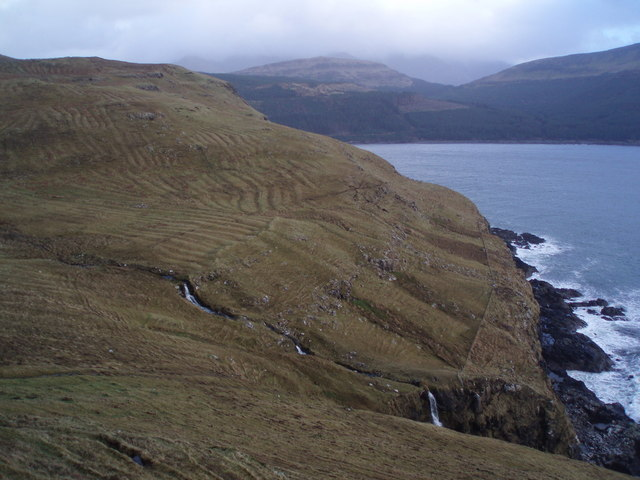
The remains of old runrig strips beside Loch Eynort, Isle of Skye

Run rig, or runrig, also known as rig-a-rendal, was a system of land tenure practised in Scotland, particularly in the Highlands and Islands. It was used on open fields for arable farming. Scottish Gaelic names include mòr-earrann (lit. 'large portion'), magh mu seach ('one field at a time'), iomair mu seach ('one ridge at a time'), fearann-tuatha ('peasant field'); in Scots it was generally rin-rig. Its origins are not clear, but it is possible that the practice was adopted in the late medieval period, supplanting earlier enclosed fields which were associated with a more dispersed pattern of settlement. It fell into decline mainly over the last quarter of the 18th century and the first quarter of the 19th century.

The land was divided into towns or townships, comprising an area of cultivable "in-bye" land and a larger area of pasture and rough grazing. The in-bye was divided into strips – "rigs" – which were periodically reassigned among the tenants of the township so that no individual had continuous use of the best land. This periodical reassignment can be considered a defining feature of run rig. The majority of townships were rented by tacksmen and sublet to the actual farming tenants. Some tacksmen would have leases on several townships.

The detailed working of run rig differed from place to place. The degree of co-operation in these communal farms was one of these aspects. In some instances, where ploughing was carried out by horse gangs, the responsibility for this was shared among the tenants – so providing an obvious communal activity. The Breadalbane estate was an example of this. However, there is no evidence for this sort of organisation on Tiree, where the arable lands were almost entirely ploughed. A further complication was that many parts of the West Highlands used the caschrom to work arable, especially in the Hebrides, so there was no need for a shared plough team.

Two documented methods of working run rig demonstrate the relatively limited level of co-operative working. The first is found in a 1785 survey of Netherlorne on the Breadalbane estate. Here the typical township had eight tenants who would plough all the arable land, then divide it into parts judged to be of equal quality and draw lots, for each crop, as to who would occupy each part. The tenant of each part would then prepare his own section for sowing, broadcast his seed and then finally harvest. The second example is on North Uist, where spade and caschrom working was used. Here the land was divided before any working of the soil – each lot was worked entirely individually by the occupier. Dodgshon discusses the misconception that communal working was the main characteristic of run rig. Instead a key defining feature was the holding of intermixed strips of land on the arable area. His conclusion is that run rig was not an archaic system of management based on communal ownership; rather it was a system that valued private property and employed communal activity only when necessary.

From the mid-18th century the system was steadily supplanted in Scotland as the in-bye was divided into crofts under fixed tenancy, but run rig survived into the 20th century in some parts of the Hebrides. Where Crofting began to dominate in the Highlands and Isles, the Lowlands transitioned to estate arrangements of individual farms whose lands were laid out in the typical rectilinear field enclosure systems, with one or many fields farmed by the one resident family.

In Ireland, a similar system was called rundale. The run rig system of tenure should not be confused with the agricultural practice known as rig and furrow, which produced permanent ridges in arable fields. This resulted from the horsedrawn plough being worked in a clockwise direction, with the mould board turning the furrow to the right, thereby creating these ridges ("rigs") in the fields over time. A run rig system of agriculture may or may not produce a rig and furrow landscape, depending on the method of cultivation used.

== See also ==
- Open-field system
- Lazy bed
