= Céide Fields =

Archaeological site in Ireland

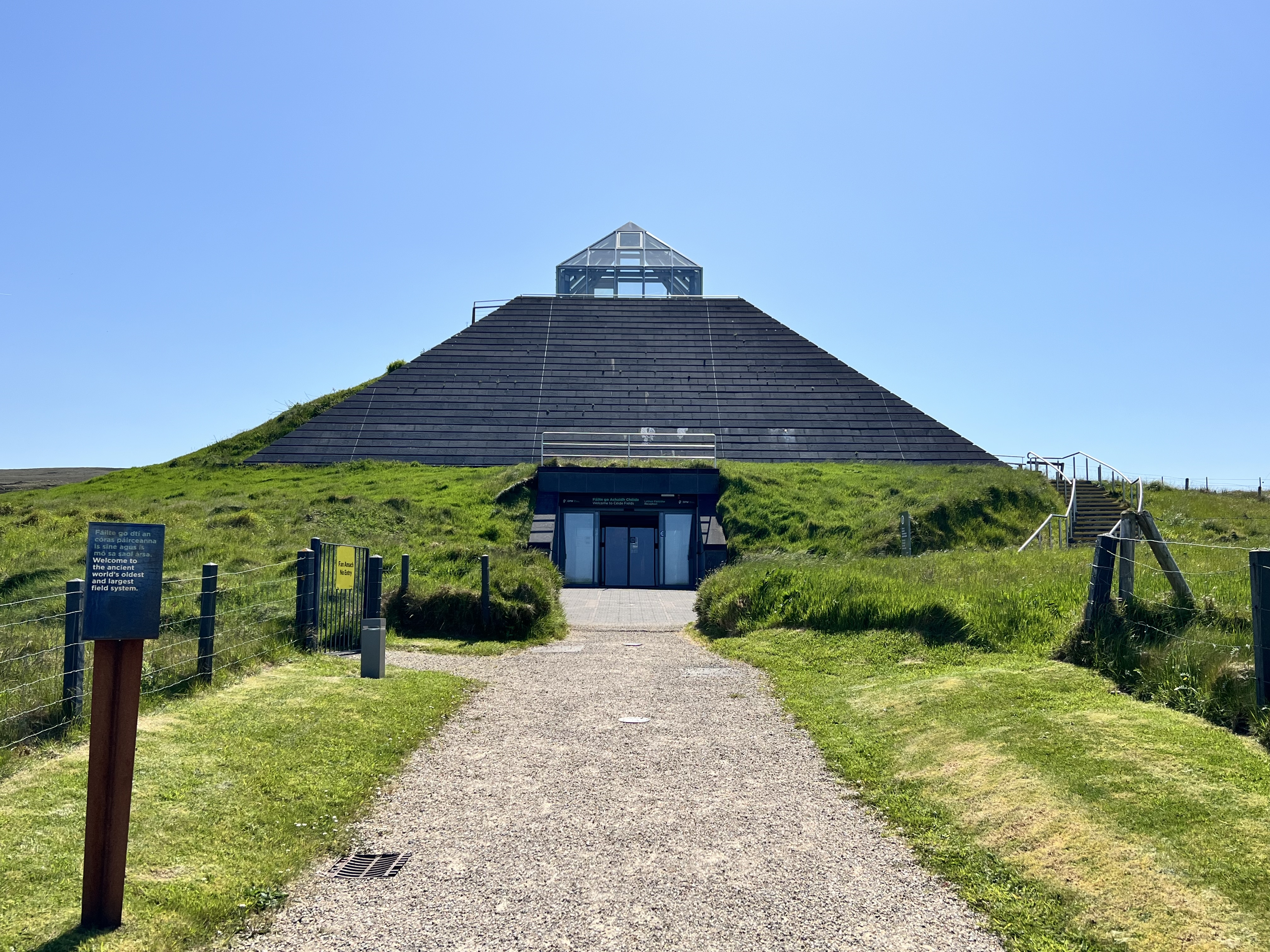
- Céide Fields visitor center in 2026
- Interactive map of Céide Fields
- 54°18′25″N 9°27′28″W
- Location: County Mayo, Ireland

History
- Built: c. 3500 BC

The Céide Fields (Irish: Achaidh Chéide, meaning 'flat-topped hill fields') is an extensive prehistoric archaeological landscape located on the north coast of County Mayo, Ireland.

The complex consists of buried stone-walled field systems, habitation evidence, enclosures, and megalithic monuments preserved beneath blanket bog. The site has traditionally been interpreted as a Neolithic farming landscape dating to the fourth millennium BCE, based on radiocarbon dating, palaeoenvironmental analysis, excavation evidence, and long-term archaeological investigation conducted throughout the Céide Fields and wider North Mayo region.

An alternative interpretation proposed by Andrew Whitefield has suggested that aspects of the landscape may be more comparable to later Bronze Age or Iron Age field systems documented elsewhere in Europe.

The Behy court tomb, a megalithic monument, lies within the Céide Fields complex.

The site is in UNESCO's tentative list to gain World Heritage status. There is estimated to be more than 100 km (62 mi) of field enclosure stone walls hidden beneath the peat bog.

== History ==
The discovery of the Céide Fields originally began in the 1930s when a schoolteacher, Patrick Caulfield, noticed linear piles of rocks which were uncovered as he cut away some peat for fuel. Caulfield noted that the rocks must have been placed there by people, because their configuration was apparently unnatural and deliberate. The rocks were also positioned beneath the bog, which suggested they were there before the bog developed, implying a very ancient origin.

The unravelling of the significance of this discovery did not begin for another forty years when Patrick's son, Seamus, having studied archaeology, began to investigate further. Investigations revealed a complex of fields, houses and megalithic tombs concealed by the growth of blanket bogs over the course of many centuries.

While research by Seamas Caulfield and other archaeologists has dated the Céide Fields complex to the Neolithic (Stone Age) period, other research has questioned this conclusion and suggested a later (Bronze Age) date.

== Research and preservation ==
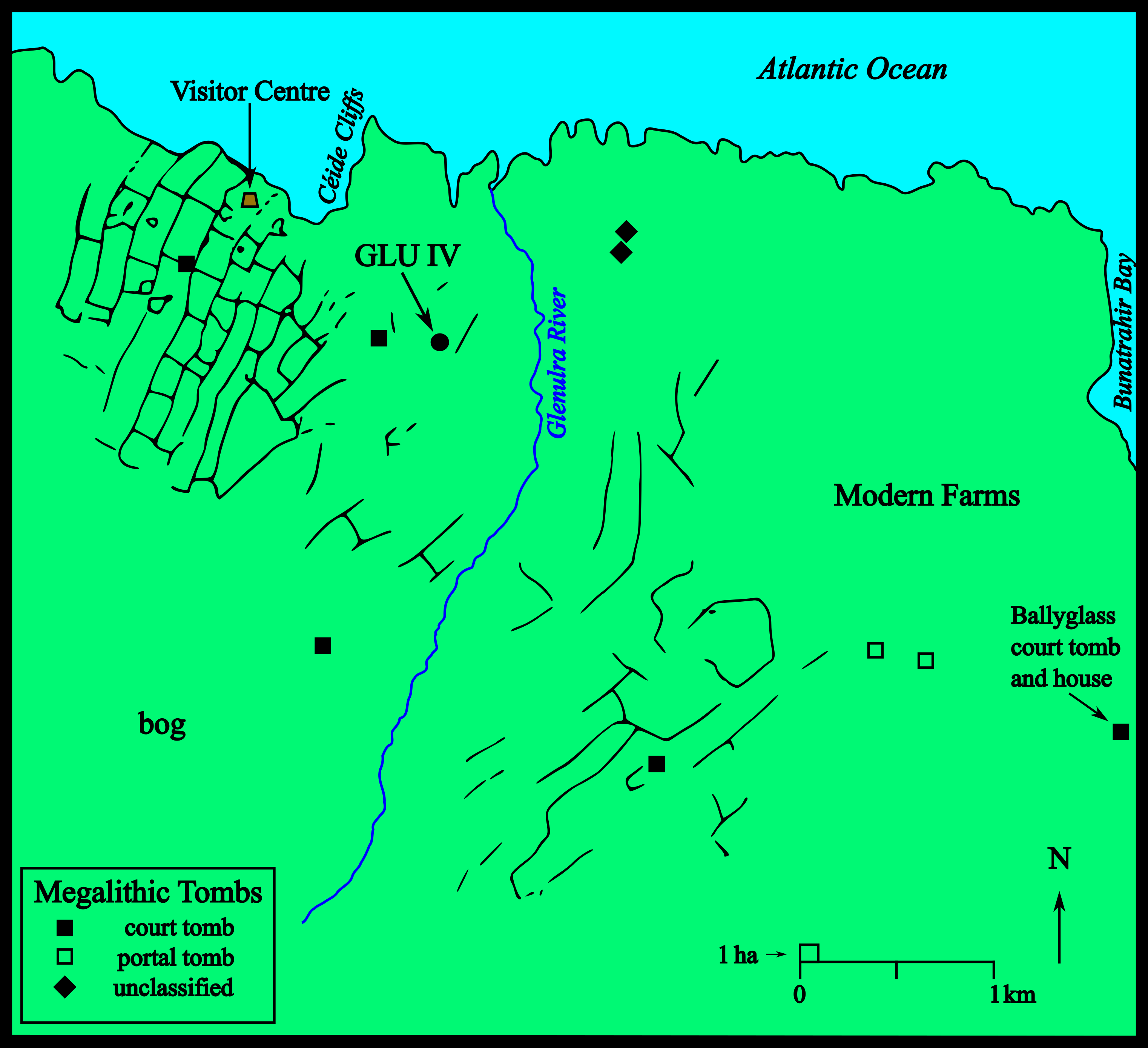
Map of the Céide Fields archaeological site

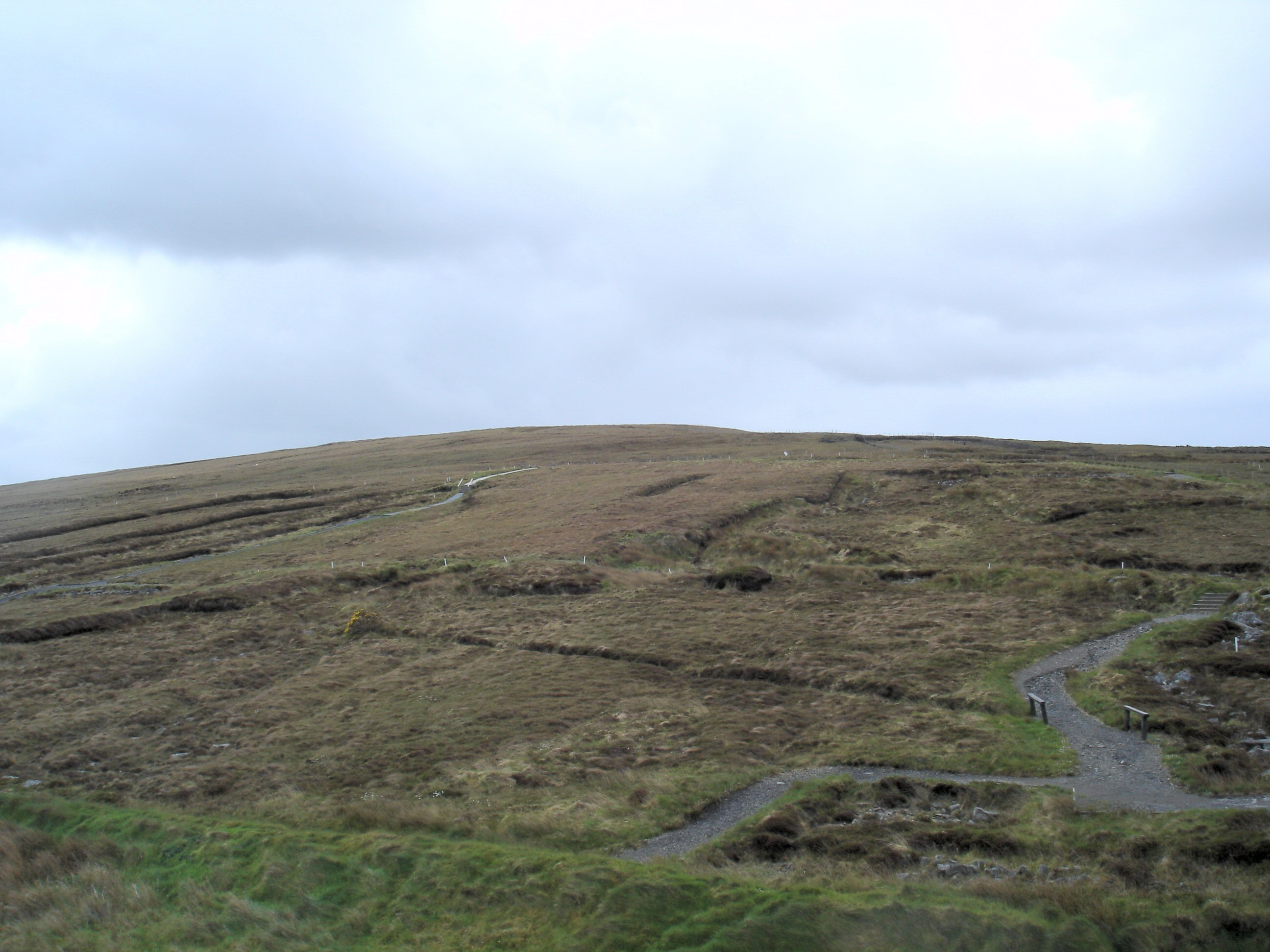
Céide Fields site in 2007

In order to preserve the site and ensure the continuation of research, a simple method was used to explore the sub-bog walls. This involved the location and mapping of these hidden walls by probing with long T-shaped iron rods. (These were locally available as they were traditionally used to probe for prehistoric fallen timber below the bog.) The ensuing excavation of habitation sites and tombs revealed the way of life of people living 200 generations earlier. They were a community of farmers who cleared large areas of forest for use as farm land. Their main economy was cattle rearing but among them were also craftspeople and builders in both wood and stone.

It was discovered that these people arrived in a land with substantial forest cover. This was cleared to provide access to arable land and to provide building material and firewood. Palaeoecological research published in 1995 and 2001 indicated that the woodland cleared by the farmers was primarily pine and birch, and was cleared to create pasture for livestock. This clearance continued onward and outward away from the area in continuing procurement of firewood.

The climate at the time was much warmer, leading to almost year-round growth potential. Samples taken from the remains of trees found in the bog provided evidence of this.

For a while, these people prospered, but some changes led to the development of raised bogs and the transformation of the arable land into barren and unusable land. An ironpan has developed in the subsoil over the area of the Céide Fields.

Seamas Caulfield has estimated that there is more than 100 km (62 mi) of stone wall hidden beneath the bog.

== See also ==
- Lynchet
- Kilcommon
