= Torata District =

Coordinates: 17.0766°S 70.8443°W

Torata Turata
- District
- Interactive map of Torata
- Country: Peru
- Region: Moquegua
- Province: Mariscal Nieto
- Capital: Torata

Government
  - Mayor: Angel Manuel Hurtado Jiménez

Area
  - Total: 1,793.37 km^{2} (692.42 sq mi)
- Elevation: 2,195 m (7,201 ft)

Population (2007 census)
  - Total: 6,591
  - Density: 3.675/km^{2} (9.519/sq mi)
- Time zone: UTC-5 (PET)
- UBIGEO: 180106

Torata District is one of six districts of the province Mariscal Nieto in Moquegua Region, Peru.

== Geography ==
Some of the highest mountains of the district are listed below:

- Achuqallani
- Apachita Limani
- Aruntaya
- Chinchillani
- Chuqi Ananta
- Ch'iyar Jaqhi
- Iruma
- Kuntur Ikiña
- K'ank'awini
- Llallawani
- Misa Qalani
- Pumani
- Qutani
- Suri Wayku
- Tutupaka
- Wañuma
- Wayllani

== Climate ==
Climate data for Yacango, Torata, elevation 2,191 m (7,188 ft), (1991–2020)
| Month | Jan | Feb | Mar | Apr | May | Jun | Jul | Aug | Sep | Oct | Nov | Dec | Year |
|---|---|---|---|---|---|---|---|---|---|---|---|---|---|
| Mean daily maximum °C (°F) | 22.5 (72.5) | 22.5 (72.5) | 22.7 (72.9) | 22.8 (73.0) | 23.0 (73.4) | 23.0 (73.4) | 23.0 (73.4) | 23.5 (74.3) | 23.6 (74.5) | 23.6 (74.5) | 23.5 (74.3) | 23.3 (73.9) | 23.1 (73.5) |
| Mean daily minimum °C (°F) | 12.0 (53.6) | 12.4 (54.3) | 12.5 (54.5) | 11.9 (53.4) | 11.1 (52.0) | 10.7 (51.3) | 10.2 (50.4) | 10.7 (51.3) | 11.2 (52.2) | 11.5 (52.7) | 11.3 (52.3) | 11.6 (52.9) | 11.4 (52.6) |
| Average precipitation mm (inches) | 17.9 (0.70) | 23.9 (0.94) | 12.1 (0.48) | 0.6 (0.02) | 0.7 (0.03) | 0.2 (0.01) | 0.3 (0.01) | 0.2 (0.01) | 0.0 (0.0) | 0.0 (0.0) | 0.0 (0.0) | 2.7 (0.11) | 58.6 (2.31) |
Source: National Meteorology and Hydrology Service of Peru

== Mayors ==
- 2011-2014: Angel Manuel Hurtado Jiménez.
- 2007-2010: Higinio Zoilo Cabana Diaz.

== Festivities ==
- Candelaria Virgin
