= Osmore River =

River in Moquegua Region, Peru

Osmore River Moquegua River, Rio Coscori, Rio Tumilaca, Ilo River
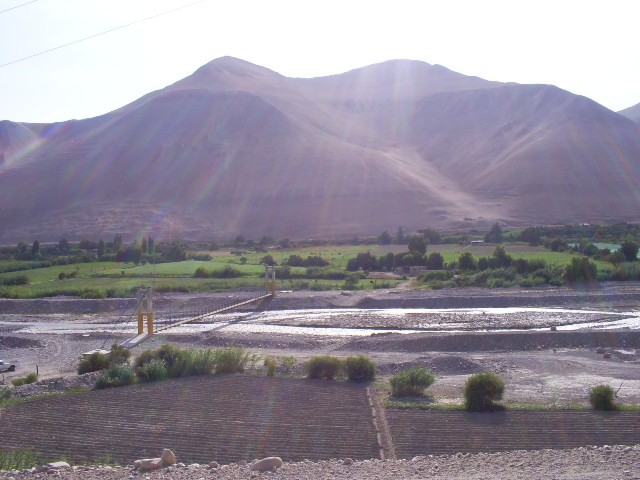
- Moquegua (Osmore) River Valley

- Location of mouth

Location
- Country: Peru
- State: Moquegua Region
- Region: South America

Physical characteristics
- Source: Chuquiananta and Arundane Mountains
  - location: Sierra, Peru
  - coordinates: 16°52′00″S 70°26′00″W
  - elevation: 5,100 m (16,700 ft)
- Mouth: Pacific Ocean
  - location: Ilo, Coastal Pacific Ocean, Peru
  - coordinates: 17°43′0″S 71°20′0″W
  - elevation: 0 m (0 ft)Pacific Ocean
- Length: 480 km (300 mi)approx.
- Basin size: 3,480 km^{2} (1,340 sq mi)approx.

Basin features
- River system: Moquegua River

Osmore River (also Moquegua, Ilo, or Tumilaca) system flows northeast to southwest in the Moquegua Region of southern coastal Peru. The river has its origin in the snow peaks of the Chuqi Ananta and Arundane mountains, at an elevation of 5,100 metres (16,700 ft) above sea level. It changes names as it descends from the Andes: from its origin it is called the Moquegua, then Osmore in the middle valley as Rio Coscori and Rio Tumilaca including where the river disappears into subterranean channels, and further down in the lower reaches as Rio Ilo.

An initial reconnaissance of the archaeological treasures of the valley carried out in the 1980s revealed more than 500 archeological sites dated from 10,000 years of human occupation. The Asana archaeological site, occupied over a period of 8,000 years, is located by the Asana River, a tributary of the Osmore.

There are also Wari culture sites, and the Tiwanaku culture sites in the area; this is where these two cultures came in contact.

== Geography ==
The river basin is situated within Moquegua Region's Mariscal Nieto and Ilo provinces. It is geographically located between parallels 16 º 52 'and 17 º 43' south latitude and between the meridians 70 º 26 'and 71 ° 20' west longitude. The hydrographic system is part of the Pacific slope.

The river flows along a geological fault known as Cholo fault, and flows over a length of 480 kilometres (300 mi)draining an area of 1,343 square miles (3,480 km^{2}) (of which 680 square kilometres (260 sq mi) are in a wet basin, located above 3,900 metres (12,800 ft)). It debouches in to the Pacific after dropping over a height of over 5,000 metres (16,000 ft) in its short stretch of 480 kilometres (300 mi) from the source and thus having a river gradient of 3.6% (close to a highway gradient). It has several tributaries which have their origin in the western cordillera.

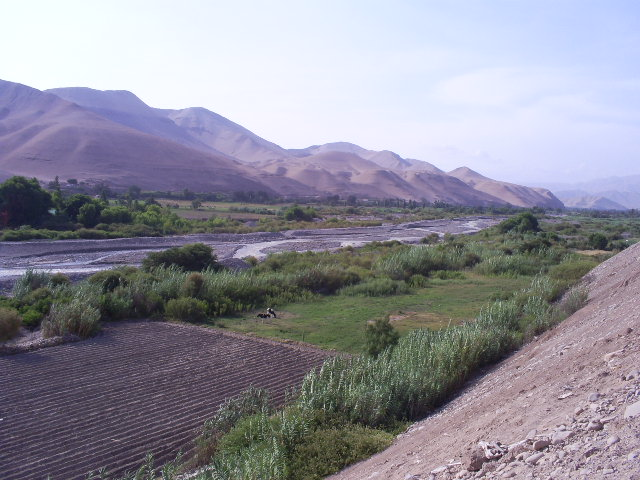
Moquegua Valley in Peru.

The river basin is bounded on the north by the Tambo River basin, which is a sub-basin of the Vizcachas River; on the east and south, with the Locumba River basin; and on the west by the Pacific Ocean and the region between Moquegua and Tambo, formed by a series of short and medium streams.

From north to south the tributaries are: the Huraicane River (also called Otora) with a drainage area of 505 square kilometres (195 sq mi) over a flow length of 59 kilometres (37 mi); the Torata River (Quilancha River) draining 410 square kilometres (160 sq mi) in a river length of 65 kilometres (40 mi); and the Moquegua (Tumilaca), the largest tributary with basin area of 625 square kilometres (241 sq mi), which has two tributaries, the Coscori (formed by the Asana River and the Chareque) and the Capallune, flowing over a length of 61 kilometres (38 mi) only.

The upper Osmore drainage is known as the Otora Valley.

The middle section of the river came into prominence as Moquegua valley (formed by the lower tributaries) during the colonial rule and the town of the same name Moquegua was established. The lower end of the mid valley is where the river disappears from an elevation of about 1,000 metres (3,300 ft) without any trace of either of the river or any habitation traces of pre-Hispanic or Hispanic colonial rule, and reappears 30 kilometres (19 mi) short of the coast. Here it becomes a wide valley and flows through the town of Ila.

In its last stretch, the river is joined by another stream which brings in the desert wash of the Quebrada Seca de Guaneros, a stream which drains 935 square kilometres (361 sq mi) over a stream length of 87 kilometres (54 mi). Many springs in the lower valley (broad valley with flood plains developed for agriculture) were tapped for irrigation development and the river in the lower section in the coastal valley is known by the ancient name of Rio Ilo (Ilo River) with coast line occupied by villages of fishermen.

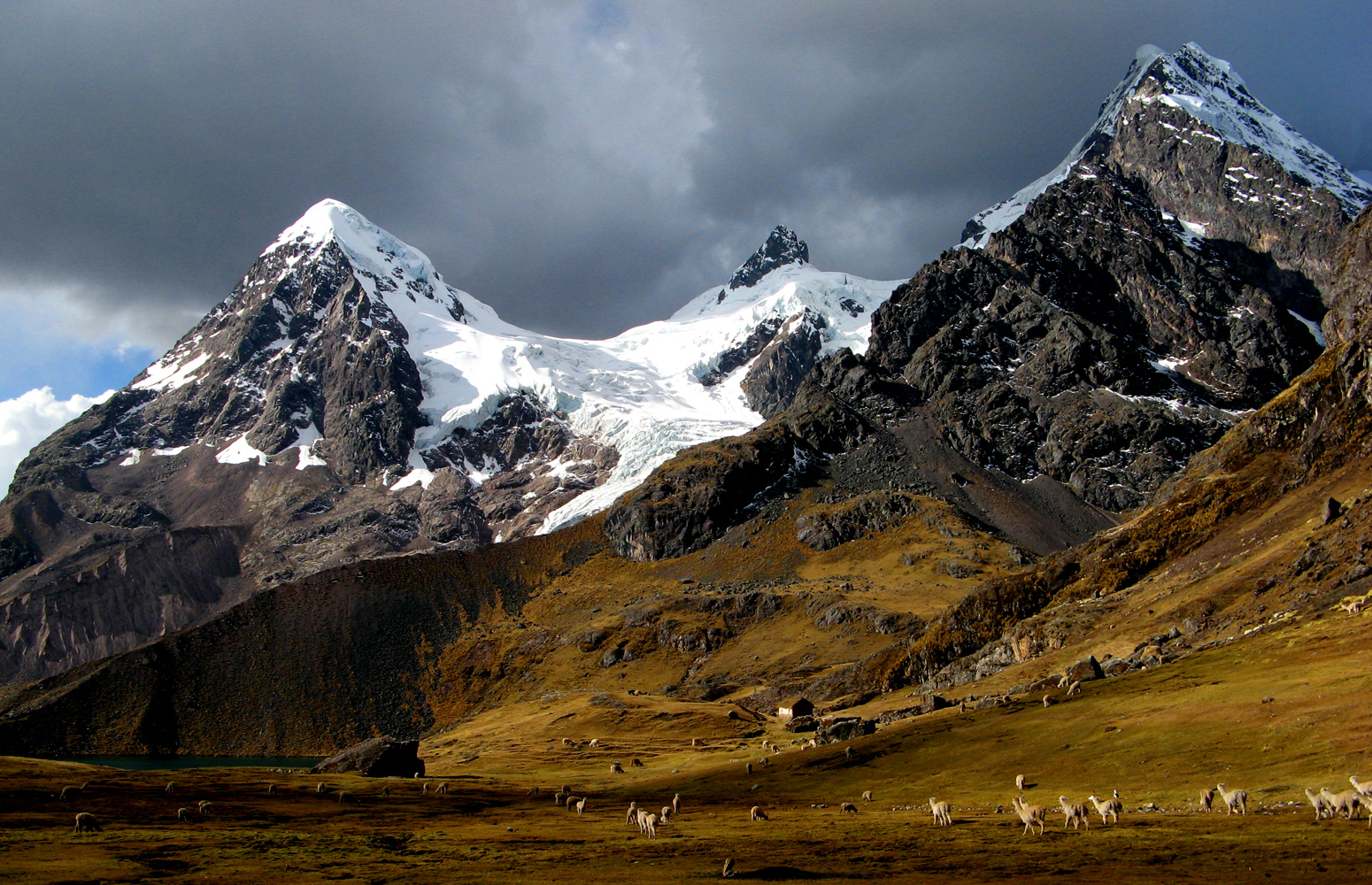
Hill side of the Peruvian Ausangate mountain.

The upper section of the Osmore contains several valleys. The midsection contains farmland, the city of Moquegua, the historical Tiwanaku town of Omo, and the Yaral site. It is here that the river disappears into underground channels, leaving behind a gorge.

The floodplains initial 10 kilometres (6.2 mi) are narrow, averaging 115 metres (377 ft) in width, while the latter 15 kilometres (9.3 mi) average 300 metres (980 ft) in width when arriving at the sea. The presence of the Tiwanaku state's existence in the Moquegua Region was determined in 1981, with 17 sites located in the Osmore drainage area.

The small settlement of Pacocha was built at the mouth of the river. In the late 19th century, high tides of the Pacific Ocean flooded the town, and the residents relocated to Ilo, on higher ground.

== Ecological features ==
The ecological features of the valley above 2,000 metres (6,600 ft) elevation is dictated by the rainfall, which is seasonal. However, at lower elevations rainfall is almost nil and hence considered as the "world's driest desert, where decades can pass without even a shower."

In the upstream reaches of the valley, the Asana River is one of the four major tributaries of the Moquegua (Tumilaca) River, which becomes the Osmore River downstream. It is situated in the south central Andes mountains. The main Asana has its primary source at an elevation of 4,800 metres (15,700 ft). This is within the pampas in the peripheral region of the high puna, defined as an area (Pampa Tinajones and Apachita Limani) above 3,800 metres (12,500 ft) elevation. The river's run off source is seasonal precipitation including snow melt from the western cordillera of the Andes. At these high altitudes population was sparse and herding the llama and alpaca was popular. The plantation of potatoes, a frost-tolerant crop, was widely practiced at these altitudes.

Below the elevation of 3,000 metres (9,800 ft), the many tributaries to Asana River are generally dry and seasonal but the streams above this elevation demonstrate perennial flows from rainfall and snow melt. Stream discharge during the rainy season averages 2.34 cubic metres (83 cu ft)/second while in the dry season, the average was 0.53 cubic metres (19 cu ft)/second.

Ecologically the entire Asana River valley is fragile and subject to landslides. The river flows through two environmental regions. One is the puna region above 3,800 metres (12,500 ft) elevation where the climate is colder and the rainfall is also higher compared to the lower elevation areas. Vegetation and animal species types found in the region are similar up to puna rim region in elevation range of 4,000–4,600 metres (13,100–15,100 ft). The valleys in this range are narrow. In the flat valley where the Asana archaeological site was located, the geological and geomorphological features are causative factors for its existence.

== Economy ==
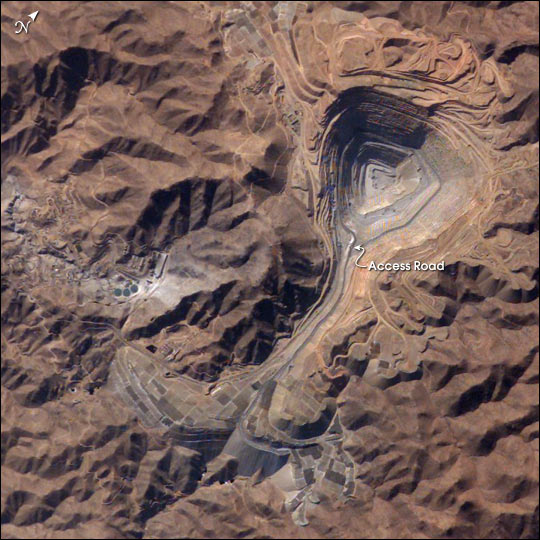
Stalleite picture of the Toquepala copper mine

The valley has fertile land where the dominant crops grown are grapes (from 1970s), corn (maize), pepper (aji), and cotton. Ilo area (coastal area) is an area of economic prosperity, more pronounced since the 16th century because of its agricultural (olives groves) and fisheries development and shipping. In spite of water shortage in the coastal belt some olive groves are still farmed. Grapes from the valley are brewed to the well known brand of Pisco brandy.

A major economic activity in the region the large porphyry copper Mining|mine known as the Toquepala mine, located the Tacna Province, Tacna Department, Peru. The mine is an open-pit mine producing copper, molybdenum, rhenium and silver with minor gold and zinc.

== Archaeological studies ==
Archaeological research not only covered the Asana in the higher reaches of the river in the Sierra but also in the Middle Horizon (500-1000AD) and the lower valley pre-Hispanic sites.

An important archaic cave discovered in the Osmore Basin is the Toquepala Caves (at 2,800 metres (9,200 ft) elevation). This cave became famous after copper was found in the valley and South Peru Copper Corporation started exploration of the Cuajone mines. The cave was studied in 1963 at the initiative of South Peru Copper Corporation (as they found large cache of artifacts during their mining operations) funded the study of the paintings in the caves by archeologists from Lima) by Jorge C. Muelle which led to the discovery of the rupestral art.

The caves have rock art of hunter-gatherers who are inferred to have lived 10,000 years ago.

The Toquepala Caves (two caves) are located near the Quebrada Cimarron, which is a dry stream flowing from the Sierra to the desert. There are more than 50 rock paintings of inhabitants of the caves of the Palaeolithic age. The rock art depicts hunting scenes with armed men hunting the animal guanaco, and they are painted in seven colours. This art was at its peak when the Collawa ethnic group lived here during the Paleolithic or Stone Age period.

This was followed by a number of investigations of the many river terraces that exist between elevation 3,500–3,600 metres (11,500–11,800 ft). The explorations were launched in subsequent years covering the upper areas of the basin of Asana and its tributaries. For these archaeological investigations, the Contisuyu Program has been established. It is a joint effort of the Field Museum of Lima, the Peruvian Museum of Health Sciences, and the Peruvian National Cultural Institute supported by the South Peru Copper Corporation with the objective of investigating, conserving, and promoting regional cultural heritage of Moquegua's portion of Contisuyu.

=== Cerro Baul ===
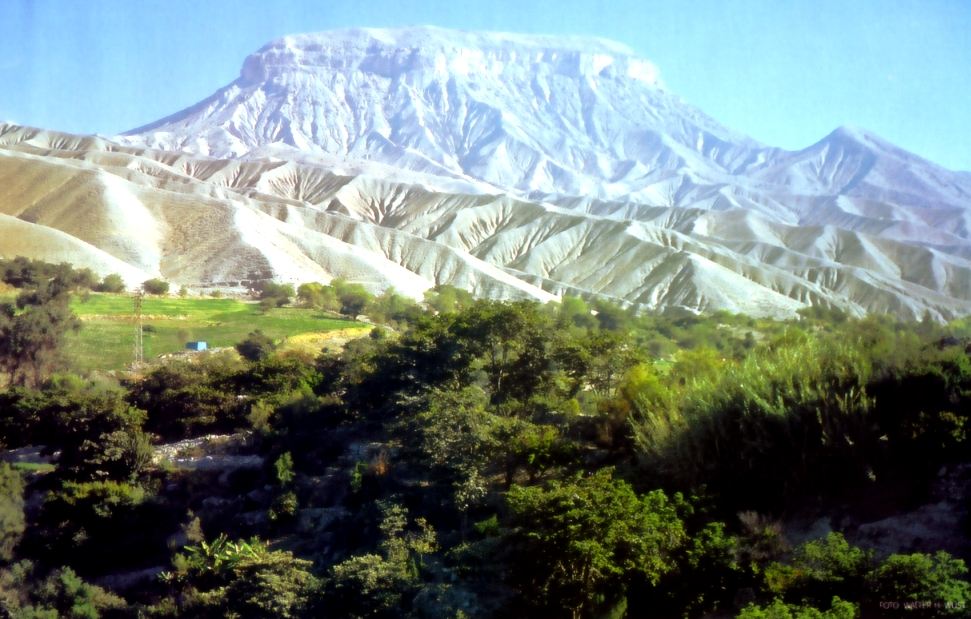
Cerro Baúl, the archaeological site located on the flat top of a hill, in Moquegua

The earliest historical record is of the Cerro Baul, an imposing mesa, or a rocky peak in the middle of the Moquegua Valley and which overlooks the valley. A city once existed on this peak, now ruined.

Early on, Cerro Baul was a major center for the Wari culture; it flourished between AD 600 and 1000. This is where the Wari came in contact with the Tiwanaku empire of the same time. Although both cultures maintained defensible hilltop settlements, there is no indication that they were at war with each other.

Around 600 AD, the Wari brought large numbers of settlers to Cerro Baul and region. On the other hand, the earlier Tiwanaku settlement here was mostly in the lower reaches of the Moquegua river valley. Later on, there was more cooperation between them.

Cerro Mejia is another site adjacent to Cerro Baúl. It is surrounded by multiple walls.

Cerro Trapiche was another a Wari/Huaracane site in the middle valley near Tiwanaku settlements; it includes a walled hill peak with slingstone caches.

After 1000, both Tiwanaku and Wari had abandoned their Moquegua settlements, and by 1100, the sister states had entirely collapsed. The Chiribaya culture persisted along the lower and middle sections of the Osmore River until about 1400 CE.

There were considerable similarities between the Wari and Tiwanaku religious iconographies as found by archaeologists; this suggests intimate contact between the Wari and Tiwanaku. There was also Tiwanaku influence on hybrid Wari keros vessels.

==== The Inca period ====
Later on, the Inca invaded the area. The local inhabitants took refuge on the rocky cliff as they could not fight the large army of the Incas. When emperor Mayta Capac of the Inca attacked the area he surrounded the hill as the local residents had moved to the safety of the Cerro Baul cliff, which could be approached by a tortuous route. After 50 days of siege when the inhabitants of Moquegua did not get any food or water, they surrendered voluntarily after they ascertained that Mayta Capac would not harm them at all. Now the ruins of the store houses and other remnant structures of the original inhabitants (not of Incas) are seen here in the backdrop of the snow-covered peaks of the Andes.

Archeologists have identified several plazas and large buildings in a packed condition in the core area, deep storage pits of granaries and water storage cisterns, grindstones (weighing more than 45 kilograms (99 lb)), and shreds of pottery scattered all over the area.

From the top of the Baul, Cuajone open pit copper mine is seen. This mine location is the origin of the Rio Moquegua. Now the "citadel city of Cerro Baul" (covering an area of 8 hectares (20 acres)) is witness to some ancient architecture with many ruins containing large cache of artifacts, designed textiles, and mummified human remains. Desolate untended agricultural terraces are seen on the slopes of the mountain with canals leading to the desert plains.

=== Agricultural terraces ===
On both sides of the river valley agricultural terraces abutting the hills and with canal systems are seen in an abandoned state. They are locally named as andenes while the entire region of the caldebara is under the Andes system. Farmed terraces are features of the hill slopes of the region even now but the area under farming is much less than it existed in the pre-historic times, while the barren terraces still exist. One unanswered feature is the reason for the abandoned status of the terraces.

=== Torata ===
Torata is another ancient settlement in the Sierra mountains, where the local inhabitants moved from the Cerro Baul, after Incas had forced them to do so. The locale has large terrace systems and is also "a complex of monumental architecture". There is an altiplano (not seen in the coastal belt) Chulpas. The altiplano has stone storehouses of the Inca deserted 500 years ago). A fortified village is also seen here where the architecture and pottery culture is juxtaposed over the local culture. An Inca administrative center is also seen next to this village. Torata was the scene of The battle of Torata which was part of the Peruvian War of Independence that took place 19 January 1823 in the high Torata (town located northeast of Moquegua) between the Liberation Army of Peru, under the command of Argentinean General Rudecindo Alvarado, and Royal Army of Peru under Gen. Brigadier [[Jerónimo Valdés. The war ended with the defeat of patriots whose army was completely routed two days later at the Battle of Moquegua with support of Gen José de Canterac.

=== Moquegua ===
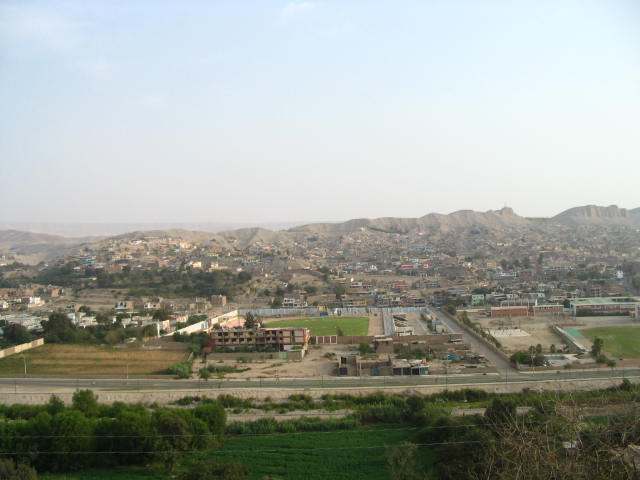
A view of modern Moquegua.

Moquegua is now a modern city in the valley in the lower reaches of the river. In this valley, canal systems and irrigated agriculture are well developed and are productive. Population is dense in the river valley near Moquegua is arid and precipitation is less than 200 millimetres (7.9 in) annually. Middens found here give a clue to the type of crops grown in the past. In the past, the agricultural lands were used to grow maize, beans, cotton, and fruit trees of avocado which are now replaced by grapes which are brewed to make the popular Pisco brandy. Located in the Moquegua Region, of Moquegua is now the regional capital. It is also the capital of Mariscal Nieto Province and Moquegua District. It is located 1,144 kilometres (711 mi)) south from the capital city of Lima.

=== Ilo ===
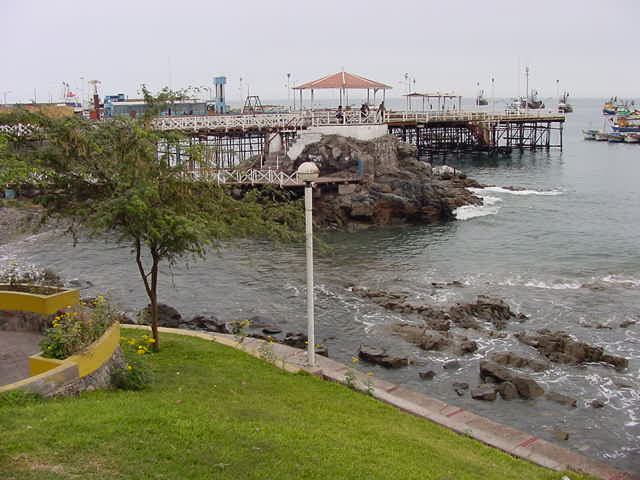
Ilo, a port town

Ilo is the city on the coast where olive orchard are still seen in some locations, a heritage of the past civilization]]. Before the arrival of the Spanish in the 16th century, the area was populated by the Chiribaya civilization. Water is very scarce here. The smelter plant of the South Peru Copper Corporation is located close to the city and the water supply needs for this plant are provided from desalinized sea water subject to treatment in the desalination plants. Fishing and collection of marine resources have been a tradition here. It is now the largest port city in the Moquegua Region.

== Bibliography ==
- Aldenderfer, Mark S. (1998). Montane Foragers: Asana and the South-Central Andean Archaic. Iowa City: University of Iowa Press. ISBN 978-1-58729-474-7.
- Kennett, Douglas J.; Winterhalder, Bruce (1 January 2006). Behavioral Ecology And the Transition to Agriculture. University of California Press. pp. 172–. ISBN 978-0-520-24647-8.
- Rice, Prudence M. (15 December 2011). Vintage Moquegua: History, Wine, and Archaeology on a Colonial Peruvian Periphery. University of Texas Press. ISBN 978-0-292-74254-3.
