= Yaritani (Peru) =

Mountain in Peru

- Location within Peru

Highest point
- Elevation: 4,600 m (15,100 ft)
- Coordinates: 16°32′11″S 70°14′17″W

Geography
- Location: Peru, Moquegua Region
- Parent range: Andes

Yaritani (yarita local name for Azorella compacta, Aymara -ni a suffix to indicate ownership, "the one with yarita") is a mountain in the Peruvian Andes, about 4,600 metres (15,092 ft) high. It is located in the Moquegua Region, Mariscal Nieto Province, Carumas District. Yaritani lies west of Q'iwiri, northwest of Ch'iyar Jaqhi and south of Pinkilluni.
