= Moquegua (disambiguation) =

Moquegua may refer to:

- Moquegua, a city in southern Peru
- Moquegua District, a district in the Mariscal Nieto Province
- Moquegua Region, a region in southern Peru
- Battle of Moquegua, a 1823 battle of the Peruvian War of Independence
