= Wawa Chaki =

Mountain in Peru

- Location within Peru

Highest point
- Elevation: 5,000 m (16,000 ft)
- Coordinates: 16°54′29″S 70°33′39″W

Geography
- Location: Peru, Moquegua Region
- Parent range: Andes

Wawa Chaki (Quechua wawa child, baby, chaki foot, "child foot", Hispanicized spelling Huahuachaqui, also Negra Huahuachaqui, Negro Huahuachaqui) is a mountain in the Andes of southern Peru, about 5,000 metres (16,404 ft) high. It is situated in the Moquegua Region, Mariscal Nieto Province, Carumas District. Wawa Chaki lies southwest of the mountains Uma Jalsu and Millu.
