= Tutupaca (Moquegua-Tacna) =

Mountain in Peru

- Location within Peru

Highest point
- Elevation: 5,200 m (17,100 ft)
- Coordinates: 17°01′51″S 70°26′54″W

Geography
- Location: Peru, Moquegua Region, Tacna Region
- Parent range: Andes

Tutupaca is a mountain in the Andes of southern Peru, about 5,200 metres (17,060 ft) high. It is located in the Moquegua Region, Mariscal Nieto Province, Torata District, and in the Tacna Region, Candarave Province, Camilaca District. Tutupaca is situated southeast of the mountains Limani and Apachita Limani, west of Tutupaca volcano, north of Chuqi Ananta and Wañuma, and northeast of Pumani. The Asana River originates near Tutupaca and it flows to the southwest.
