= Phaq'u Tanka =

Mountain in Peru

- Location within Peru

Highest point
- Elevation: 5,000 m (16,000 ft)
- Coordinates: 16°37′45″S 70°13′40″W

Geography
- Location: Peru, Moquegua Region
- Parent range: Andes

Phaq'u Tanka (Aymara phaq'u, paqu, p'aqu light brown, reddish, blond, dark chestnut, tanka hat or biretta, "chestnut coloured hat (or biretta)", Hispanicized spelling Pacotanca) is a mountain in the Andes of southern Peru, about 5,000 metres (16,404 ft) high. It is situated in the Moquegua Region, Mariscal Nieto Province, Carumas District. Phaq'u Tanka lies west of the mountain Qhini Jamach'ini and northwest of Qina Mich'ini and Arichuwa.
