= Sirka Sirka =

Mountain in Peru

- Location within Peru

Highest point
- Elevation: 5,200 m (17,100 ft)
- Coordinates: 16°33′27″S 70°10′49″W

Geography
- Location: Peru, Moquegua Region, Puno Region
- Parent range: Andes

Sirka Sirka (Aymara sirka, vein of a mine, the reduplication suggesting "many veins", Hispanicized spelling Cercacerca) is a 5,200 m (17,100 ft) mountain in the Peruvian Andes, in the Moquegua Region of Mariscal Nieto Province (Carumas District) and the Puno Region of Puno Province (Acora District), southeast of Q'iwiri.
