= Chinchillani (Peru) =

Mountain in Peru

- Location within Peru

Highest point
- Elevation: 4,800 m (15,700 ft)
- Coordinates: 17°07′00″S 70°30′00″W

Geography
- Location: Peru, Moquegua Region, Mariscal Nieto Province, Tacna Region, Candarave Province
- Parent range: Andes

Chinchillani (possibly from Aymara chinchilla a kind of rodent, -ni a suffix, "the one with the chinchilla (or chinchillas)) is a mountain in the Andes of southern Peru, about 4,800 m (15,700 ft) high. It is situated in the Moquegua Region, Mariscal Nieto Province, Torata District, and in the Tacna Region, Candarave Province, Camilaca District. Chinchillani lies southwest of Chuquiananta.
