= Khunu Qullu =

Mountain in Peru

- Location within Peru

Highest point
- Elevation: 5,000 m (16,000 ft)
- Coordinates: 16°38′35″S 70°10′58″W

Geography
- Location: Peru, Moquegua Region
- Parent range: Andes

Khunu Qullu (Aymara khunu snow, qullu mountain, "snow mountain", Hispanicized spelling Cuno Ccollo) is a mountain in the Andes of southern Peru, about 5,000 metres (16,404 ft) high. It is located in the Moquegua Region, Mariscal Nieto Province, Carumas District, near Qina Mich'ini.
