= Achucallani =

Mountain in Peru

- Location within Peru

Highest point
- Elevation: 5,000 m (16,000 ft)
- Coordinates: 16°56′19″S 70°37′33″W

Geography
- Location: Peru, Moquegua Region
- Parent range: Andes

Achucallani (possibly from Aymara achuqalla weasel, -ni a suffix to indicate ownership, "the one with a weasel (or weasels)") is a mountain in the Andes of southern Peru, about 5,000 metres (16,404 ft) high. It is situated in the Moquegua Region, Mariscal Nieto Province, Torata District. Achucallani lies southwest of Humajalso, Iruma and Surehuayco.
