= Jat'ita Patxa =

Mountain in Peru

- Location within Peru

Highest point
- Elevation: 5,310 m (17,420 ft)
- Coordinates: 16°37′47″S 70°10′32″W

Geography
- Location: Peru, Moquegua Region
- Parent range: Andes

Jat'ita Patxa (Aymara Jat'iña to make a hole, to dig, -ta participle ending, patxa ridge, "ridge with a hole (or holes)" or "dug ridge", also spelled Jatitapadja, Jatipadja) is a 5,310-metre-high (17,420 ft) mountain in the Andes of southern Peru. It is located in the Moquegua Region, Mariscal Nieto Province, Carumas District. Jat'ita Patxa lies southwest of Wilaquta.
