= Arichuwa (Moquegua) =

Mountain in Peru

- Location within Peru

Highest point
- Elevation: 5,000 m (16,000 ft)
- Coordinates: 16°38′06″S 70°12′51″W

Geography
- Location: Peru, Moquegua Region
- Parent range: Andes

Arichuwa (Aymara or Quechua for a kind of potatoes, Hispanicized spelling Arichua) is a mountain in the Andes of southern Peru, about 5,000 metres (16,404 ft) high. It is situated in the Moquegua Region, Mariscal Nieto Province, Carumas District. Arichuwa lies north of the lake Aqhuyach'alla (Pasto Grande), southwest of the mountains Wilaquta, Qurini and Qhini Jamach'ini, and west of Qina Mich'ini.
