= Pocata =

Human settlement in Moquegua, Peru

Coordinates: 17°07′10″S 70°48′35″W

- Human Settlement
- Interactive map of Pocata

Pocata is a small settlement in the mountains of the Moquegua Region of Peru. It is approximately 15km away from Moquegua.

== Transportation ==
The MO-587 road passes through the settlement.
