= Qhini Jamach'ini =

Mountain in Peru

- Location within Peru

Highest point
- Elevation: 5,200 m (17,100 ft)
- Coordinates: 16°37′42″S 70°11′28″W

Geography
- Location: Peru, Moquegua Region
- Parent range: Andes

Qhini Jamach'ini (Aymara qhini selected, best potato, jamach'i bird; a variety of potato (Solanum tuberosum subsp. andigena), -ni a suffix to indicate ownership, Hispanicized spelling Queneamachini) is a mountain in the Peruvian Andes, about 5,200 metres (17,060 ft) high. It is located in the Moquegua Region, Mariscal Nieto Province, Carumas District. It lies north of the lake named Aqhuya Ch'alla (Pasto Grande), southwest of Wilaquta and Qurini, north of Qina Mich'ini and northeast of Arichuwa. A little lake named Janq'u Jamach'ini (Jancoamachini) is situated northwest of Qhini Jamach'ini.
