= Janq'u Llaqa =

Mountain in Peru

- Location within Peru

Highest point
- Elevation: 5,200 m (17,100 ft)
- Coordinates: 16°43′00″S 70°02′19″W

Geography
- Location: Peru, Moquegua Region
- Parent range: Andes

Janq'u Llaqa (Aymara janq'u white, llaqa feather, "white feather", hispanicized spelling Ancollaca) is a mountain in the Andes of Peru, about 5,200 metres (17,100 ft) high. It is in the Moquegua Region, Mariscal Nieto Province, Carumas District. It is southwest of Jach'a K'uchu and north of Kuntur Nasa.
