= Huañuma =

Mountain in Peru

- Location within Peru

Highest point
- Elevation: 5,200 m (17,100 ft)
- Coordinates: 17°03′57″S 70°26′48″W

Geography
- Location: Moquegua Region, Tacna Region, Peru
- Parent range: Andes

Huañuma (possibly from Aymara waña dry, uma water, "dry water") is a mountain in the Andes of southern Peru, about 5,200 metres (17,060 ft) high. It is located in the Moquegua Region, Mariscal Nieto Province, Torata District, and in the Tacna Region, Candarave Province, Camilaca District. Huañuma lies south of Limani, Apacheta Limani and Tutupaca, west of the Tutupaca volcano, north of Chuquiananta and northeast of Pomani.

Huañuma is also the name of an intermittent stream which originates near the mountain. Its waters flow to Asana River.
