= Chaka Apachita =

Mountain in Peru

- Location within Peru

Highest point
- Elevation: 5,136 m (16,850 ft)
- Coordinates: 16°39′32″S 70°01′55″W

Geography
- Location: Peru, Moquegua Region
- Parent range: Andes

Chaka Apachita (Aymara chaka bridge, apachita the place of transit of an important pass in the principal routes of the Andes; name in the Andes for a stone cairn, a little pile of rocks built along the trail in the high mountains, Hispanicized spellings Chaca Apacheta, Chacapacheta) is a 5,136-metre-high (16,850 ft) mountain in the Andes of Peru. It is situated in the Moquegua Region, Mariscal Nieto Province, Carumas District. It lies northwest of Qiwña Milluku and southeast of Qina Qinani.
