= Asana (disambiguation) =

Asana is a general Indian term for a body position, associated with Indian art, dance and the practice of yoga.

Asana may also refer to:

== Geography ==
- Asana, Peru, an archaeological site by the Asana River
- Asana River, in southern Peru
- Ya-Asana, a Fijian Island

== Living organisms ==
- Esfenvalerate, a synthetic pyrethroid insecticide
- Melese asana, a moth
- Terminalia elliptica, a tree

== People with the given name Asana ==
- Asana Mamoru (born 1990), Japanese actress
- Asana Inuzuka (born 1994), Japanese idol of SKE48
- Princess Asana, a character from the Walt Disney Pictures film, The Princess Diaries 2: Royal Engagement played by Raven-Symoné

== Other uses ==
- Asana, Inc., web and mobile collaboration software
- Asana-Math, a font for mathematical notation
- Athena (Doric Greek spelling)
