= Ch'iyar Jaqhi (Moquegua) =

Mountain in Peru

- Location within Peru

Highest point
- Elevation: 4,800 m (15,700 ft)
- Coordinates: 16°32′25″S 70°13′30″W

Geography
- Location: Peru, Moquegua Region
- Parent range: Andes

Ch'iyar Jaqhi (Aymara ch'iyara black, jaqhi precipice, cliff, "black cliff", Hispanicized spelling Chiaraque) is a mountain in the Peruvian Andes, about 4,800 metres (15,748 ft) high. It is located in the Moquegua Region, Mariscal Nieto Province, Carumas District. Ch'iyar Jaqhi lies west of the mountain Q'iwiri and southeast of Pinkilluni.
