= Qala Patxa =

Mountain in Peru

- Location within Peru

Highest point
- Elevation: 5,000 m (16,000 ft)
- Coordinates: 16°40′04″S 70°08′17″W

Geography
- Location: Peru, Moquegua Region
- Parent range: Andes

Qala Patxa (Aymara qala stone, patxa ridge, "stone ridge", possibly erroneously also spelled Calapatia (from Calapatja)) is a mountain in the Andes of southern Peru, about 5,000 metres (16,404 ft) high. It is located in the Moquegua Region, Mariscal Nieto Province, Carumas District. Qala Patxa lies southeast of Willkani.
