= Mariscal Nieto province =

Coordinates: 17°12′S 70°56′W

Mariscal Nieto
- Province
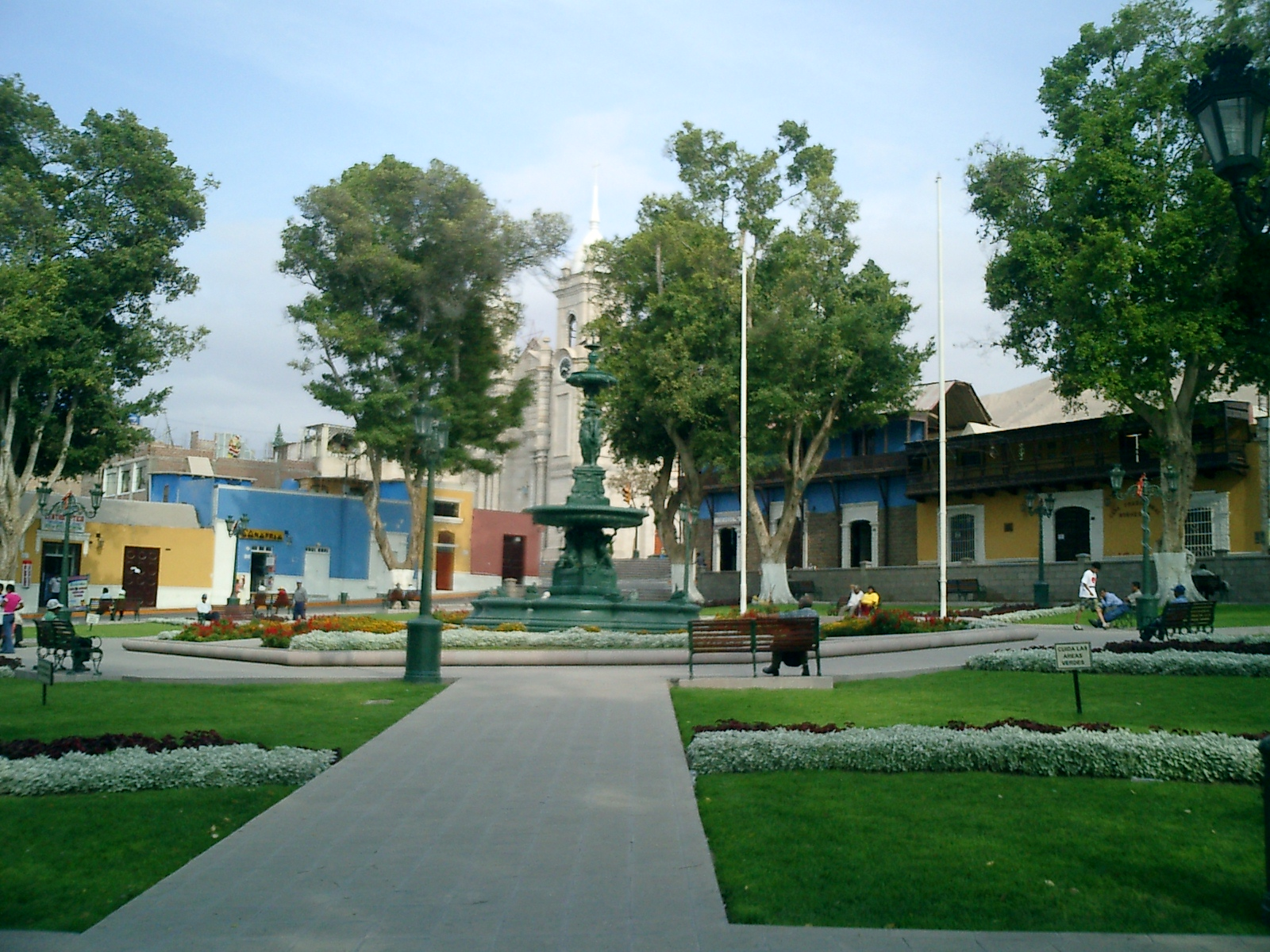
- Plaza de Armas in the capital Moquegua

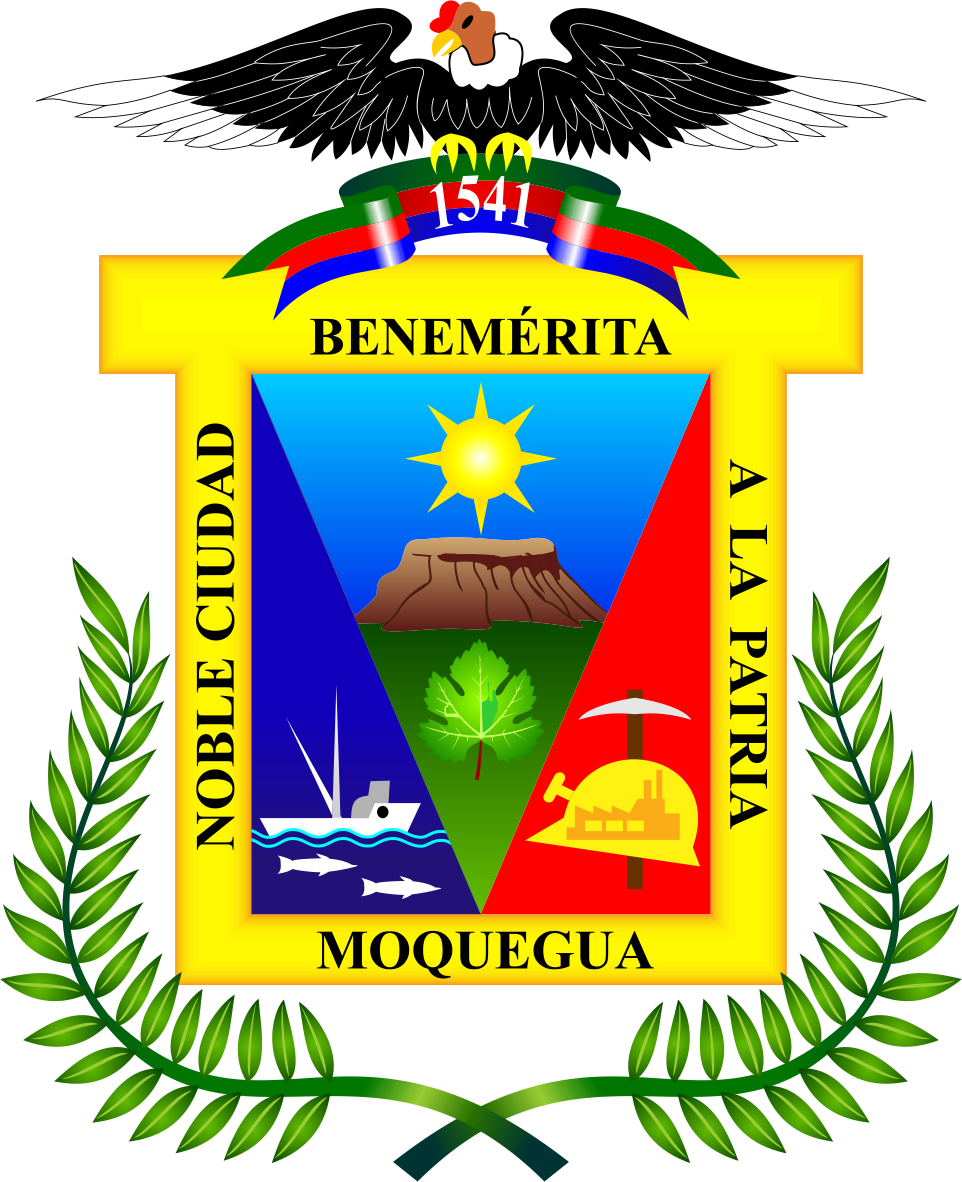
- Flag Coat of arms

- Location of Mariscal Nieto in the Moquegua Region
- Country: Peru
- Region: Moquegua
- Founded: April 3, 1936
- Capital: Moquegua

Government
  - Mayor: Abraham Alejandro Cárdenas Romero (2019-2022)

Area
  - Total: 8,671.58 km^{2} (3,348.12 sq mi)
- Elevation: 1,410 m (4,630 ft)

Population
  - Total: 85,349
  - Density: 9.8424/km^{2} (25.492/sq mi)
- UBIGEO: 1801
- Website: http://www.munimoquegua.gob.pe

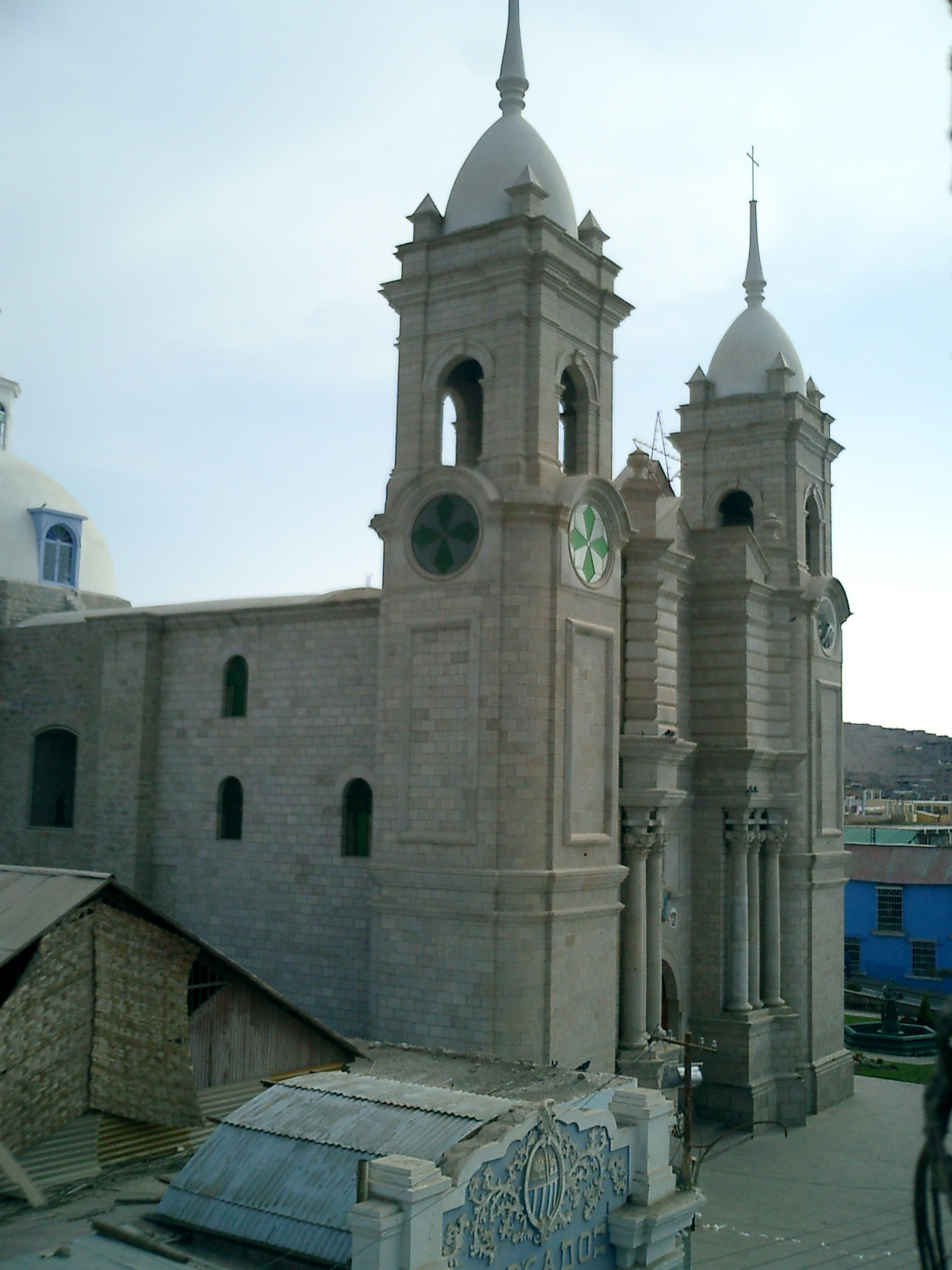
Cathedral of Moquegua

Mariscal Nieto (Spanish mariscal marshal) is the largest of three provinces that make up the Moquegua Region of Peru. The capital of the province is the city of Moquegua.

== Boundaries ==
- North: province of General Sánchez Cerro
- East: Tacna Region
- South: province of Ilo
- West: Arequipa Region

== Geography ==
Some of the highest mountains of the province are listed below:

- Achuqallani
- Apachita Limani
- Arichuwa (Moquegua)
- Arichuwa (Moquegua-Tacna)
- Chaka Apachita
- Chinchillani
- Chiñi Lakha
- Chuqi Ananta
- Churi Laq'a
- Ch'alluma
- Ch'iyar Jaqhi
- Ch'ankhani
- Iru Uma
- Iruma
- Jach'a K'uchu
- Jach'a Q'awa
- Jach'a Sirka
- Janq'u Llaqa
- Jat'ita Patxa
- Kuntur Ikiña
- Kuntur Nasa
- Kunturini
- Khunu Qullu
- K'ank'awini
- Llallawani
- Mawruma
- Millu
- Misa Qalani
- Paxsi Awki
- Pinkilluni
- Puma Sulu
- Pumani
- Phaq'u Q'awa
- Phaq'u Tanka
- Qala Patxa
- Qina Mich'ini
- Qina Qinani
- Q'iwiri
- Qiwña Milluku
- Qupa Phuju
- Qurini
- Qutani
- Qhini Jamach'ini
- Sirka Sirka
- Suri Wayku
- Taypi Patxa
- Titini
- Tixani
- Tutupaka
- Uma Jalsu
- Wañuma
- Warintapani
- Wawa Chaki
- Wayllani
- Waytiri
- Wilaquta
- Wila Wilani
- Willkani
- Wisk'acha
- Yaritani
- Yunkani

== Political divisions ==
The province is divided into six districts, which are:

District	Capital	Mayor
Moquegua	Moquegua	Abraham Alejandro Cárdenas Romero
Carumas	Carumas	Luis Victor Salas Casilla
Cuchumbaya	Cuchumbaya	Guido Maquera Cuayla
Samegua	Samegua	Renso Milthon Florencio Quiroz Vargas
San Cristóbal	Calacoa	Rogelio Leonardo Vizcarra Taco
Torata	Torata	Higinio Zoilo Cabana Diaz

== Ethnic groups ==
The province is inhabited by indigenous citizens of Aymara and Quechua descent. Spanish, however, is the language which the majority of the population (79.51%) learnt to speak in childhood, 15.65% of the residents started speaking using the Aymara language and 4.45% using Quechua (2007 Peru Census).

== See also ==
- Administrative divisions of Peru
