= Surehuayco =

Mountain in Peru

- Location within Peru

Highest point
- Elevation: 4,800 m (15,700 ft)
- Coordinates: 16°55′49″S 70°35′52″W

Geography
- Location: Peru, Moquegua Region
- Parent range: Andes

Surehuayco (possibly from Aymara suri rhea, wayku brook or gorge, "rhea brook (or gorge)") and from Quechua Suri Wayq'u) is a mountain in the Andes of southern Peru, about 4,800 metres (15,748 ft) high. It is situated in the Moquegua Region, Mariscal Nieto Province, Torata District. It lies southwest of the mountain Iruma and east of Achucallani. Surehuayco is also the name of an intermittent stream north of the mountain.
