= Qina Mich'ini =

Mountain in Peru

- Location within Peru

Highest point
- Elevation: 4,800 m (15,700 ft)
- Coordinates: 16°39′17″S 70°11′37″W

Geography
- Location: Peru, Moquegua Region
- Parent range: Andes

Qina Mich'ini (Aymara qina, qina qina a musical instrument, mich'i bow, -ni a suffix to indicate ownership, Hispanicized spelling Quenamichini) is a mountain in the Andes of southern Peru, about 4,800 metres (15,748 ft) high. It is situated in the Moquegua Region, Mariscal Nieto Province, Carumas District. Qina Mich'ini lies southwest of the mountain named Wilaquta and southeast of Phaq'u Tanka, Arichuwa and Qhini Jamach'ini.
