= Padmasana =

Padmasana is a term derived from Sanskrit word padma: lotus, and āsana: seat or throne, and may refer to:

- Lotus throne in Hindu–Buddhist art
- Lotus position in yoga
- Mayurasana in yoga
- Padmasana (shrine), a type of Balinese Hindu shrine

== See also ==
- Padma (disambiguation)
- Asana (disambiguation)
