= Phaq'u Q'awa (Moquegua-Tacna) =

Mountain in Peru

- Location within Peru

Highest point
- Elevation: 4,796 m (15,735 ft)
- Coordinates: 16°47′57″S 70°15′11″W

Geography
- Location: Peru, Moquegua Region, Tacna Region
- Parent range: Andes

Phaq'u Q'awa is a 4,796-metre-high (15,735 ft) mountain in the Andes of southern Peru. It is located in the Moquegua Region, Mariscal Nieto Province, Carumas District, and in the Tacna Region, Candarave Province, Candarave District. It lies west of a lake named Aqhuya Ch'alla (Ajuachaya, Pasto Grande) and southeast of Wila Wilani (or Ch'ankha Qullu).

== Name ==
Phaq'u Q'awa derives from Aymara language terms phaq'u, paqu, or p'aqu meaning the color light brown, reddish, fair-haired, or dark chestnut, and q'awa meaning little river, ditch, crevice, fissure, or gap in the earth, the name thus meaning "brown brook" or "brown ravine". The Hispanicized spelling is Pacocahua or Pajojañua.
