= Samegua District =

Coordinates: 17.1819°S 70.8999°W

Samegua Samiwa
- District
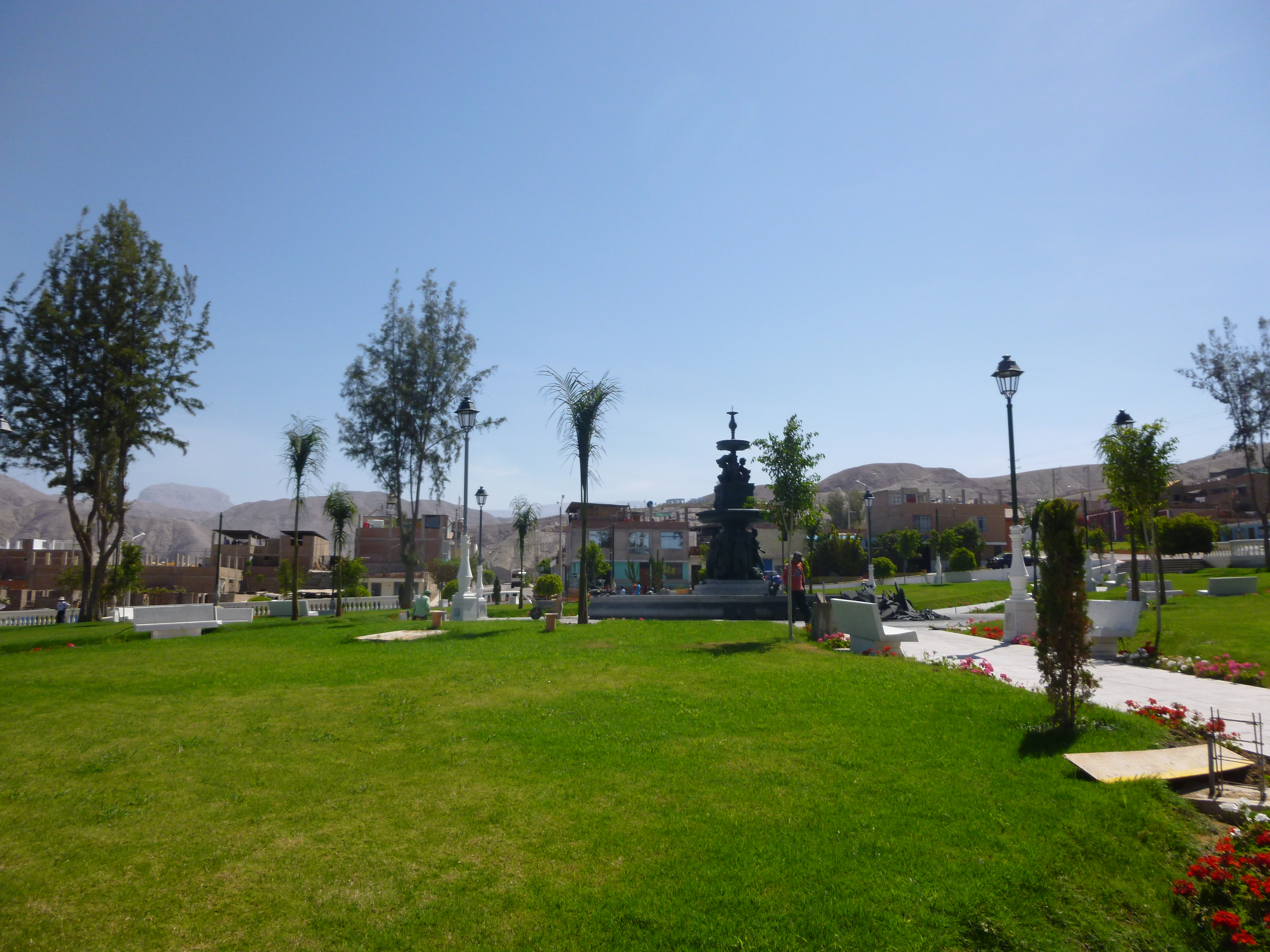
- Samegua

- Coat of arms
- Interactive map of Samegua
- Country: Peru
- Region: Moquegua
- Province: Mariscal Nieto
- Founded: November 8, 1894
- Capital: Samegua

Government
  - Mayor: Carmen Gloria Zeballos

Area
  - Total: 62.55 km^{2} (24.15 sq mi)
- Elevation: 1,558 m (5,112 ft)

Population (2007 census)
  - Total: 6,515
  - Density: 104.2/km^{2} (269.8/sq mi)
- Time zone: UTC-5 (PET)
- UBIGEO: 180104
- Website: munisamegua.gob.pe

Samegua District is one of six districts of the province Mariscal Nieto in Peru.

== History ==
Samegua District was created by Law 9940 (8 November 1894).

== Authorities ==
=== Mayors ===
- 2011-2014: Carmen Gloria Zeballos Eyzaguirre
- 2007-2010: Renso Milthon Florencio Quiroz Vargas.

== Festivities ==
- Saint Isidro
- Immaculate Conception

== See also ==
- Administrative divisions of Peru
