= Millu (Moquegua) =

Mountain in Peru

- Location within Peru

Highest point
- Elevation: 5,000 m (16,000 ft)
- Coordinates: 16°53′19″S 70°32′30″W

Geography
- Location: Peru, Moquegua Region
- Parent range: Andes

Millu (Aymara for a kind of salpeter, Quechua for salty, Hispanicized spelling Millo) is a mountain in the Andes of southern Peru, about 5,000 metres (16,404 ft) high. It is situated in the Moquegua Region, Mariscal Nieto Province, Carumas District. Millu lies south of the mountain Uma Jalsu.
