= Carumas District =

Coordinates: 16.8093°S 70.6948°W

Carumas
- District
- Interactive map of Carumas
- Country: Peru
- Region: Moquegua
- Province: Mariscal Nieto
- Capital: Carumas

Government
  - Mayor: Luis Victor Salas Casilla

Area
  - Total: 2,256.31 km^{2} (871.17 sq mi)
- Elevation: 2,985 m (9,793 ft)

Population (2005 census)
  - Total: 3,877
  - Density: 1.718/km^{2} (4.450/sq mi)
- Time zone: UTC-5 (PET)
- UBIGEO: 180102

Carumas District is one of six districts of the province Mariscal Nieto in Peru.

== Geography ==
Some of the highest mountains of the district are listed below:

- Arichuwa (Moquegua)
- Arichuwa (Moquegua-Tacna)
- Chaka Apachita
- Chiñi Lakha
- Churi Laq'a
- Ch'alluma
- Ch'ankhani
- Ch'iyar Jaqhi
- Iru Uma
- Jach'a K'uchu
- Jach'a Q'awa
- Jach'a Sirka
- Janq'u Llaqa
- Jat'ita Patxa
- Kuntur Nasa
- Kunturini
- Khunu Qullu
- Llallawani
- Mawruma
- Millu
- Paxsi Awki
- Pinkilluni
- Phaq'u Q'awa
- Phaq'u Tanka
- Qala Patxa
- Qina Mich'ini
- Qina Qinani
- Q'iwiri
- Qiwña Milluku
- Qhini Jamach'ini
- Qupa Phuju
- Qurini
- Sirka Sirka
- Taypi Patxa
- Titini
- Uma Jalsu
- Warintapani
- Wawa Chaki
- Waytiri
- Wilaquta
- Wila Wilani
- Willkani
- Wisk'acha
- Yaritani
- Yunkani

== Climate ==
Climate data for Carumas, elevation 3,055 m (10,023 ft), (1991–2020)
| Month | Jan | Feb | Mar | Apr | May | Jun | Jul | Aug | Sep | Oct | Nov | Dec | Year |
|---|---|---|---|---|---|---|---|---|---|---|---|---|---|
| Mean daily maximum °C (°F) | 19.7 (67.5) | 19.0 (66.2) | 19.5 (67.1) | 20.1 (68.2) | 20.2 (68.4) | 20.0 (68.0) | 19.9 (67.8) | 20.4 (68.7) | 20.8 (69.4) | 21.0 (69.8) | 21.0 (69.8) | 20.4 (68.7) | 20.2 (68.3) |
| Mean daily minimum °C (°F) | 5.2 (41.4) | 5.4 (41.7) | 5.3 (41.5) | 4.8 (40.6) | 4.1 (39.4) | 3.3 (37.9) | 3.0 (37.4) | 3.5 (38.3) | 4.1 (39.4) | 4.7 (40.5) | 5.0 (41.0) | 5.1 (41.2) | 4.5 (40.0) |
| Average precipitation mm (inches) | 83.3 (3.28) | 115.8 (4.56) | 65.0 (2.56) | 6.7 (0.26) | 1.2 (0.05) | 0.7 (0.03) | 1.4 (0.06) | 1.3 (0.05) | 1.4 (0.06) | 0.5 (0.02) | 1.1 (0.04) | 22.3 (0.88) | 300.7 (11.85) |
Source: National Meteorology and Hydrology Service of Peru
