= Puma Sulu =

Mountain in Peru

- Location within Peru

Highest point
- Elevation: 5,015 m (16,453 ft)
- Coordinates: 16°38′16″S 70°34′26″W

Geography
- Location: Peru, Moquegua Region
- Parent range: Andes

Puma Sulu (Aymara puma cougar, puma, sulu shell, husk, "puma shell", Hispanicized spelling Pumasolo) is a 5,015-metre-high (16,453 ft) mountain in the Andes of southern Peru. It is situated in the Moquegua Region, Mariscal Nieto Province, Calacoa District.
