= Willkani =

Mountain in Peru

- Location within Peru

Highest point
- Elevation: 5,200 m (17,100 ft)
- Coordinates: 16°38′28″S 70°09′52″W

Geography
- Location: Peru, Moquegua Region
- Parent range: Andes

Willkani (willka or wilka Anadenanthera colubrina (a tree), Aymara willka sun,-ni a suffix, Hispanicized spelling Huilcane, Huilcani) is a mountain in the Andes of southern Peru, about 5,200 metres (17,060 ft) high. It is located in the Moquegua Region, Mariscal Nieto Province, Carumas District, southwest of Chaka Apachita.
