= San Cristóbal District, Mariscal Nieto =

Coordinates: 16.7394°S 70.6836°W

San Cristóbal District Distrito de San Cristóbal de Calacoa
- District
- Interactive map of San Cristóbal District
- Country: Peru
- Region: Moquegua
- Province: Mariscal Nieto
- Founded: January 31, 1944
- Capital: Calacoa

Government
  - Mayor: Juan Rogelio Choque Nina

Area
  - Total: 542.73 km^{2} (209.55 sq mi)
- Elevation: 3,458 m (11,345 ft)

Population (2007 census)
  - Total: 3,518
  - Density: 6.482/km^{2} (16.79/sq mi)
- Time zone: UTC-5 (PET)
- UBIGEO: 180105

San Cristóbal District is one of six districts of the province Mariscal Nieto in Moquegua Region, Peru.

== History ==
San Cristobal District was created by Law 9940 (31 January 1944).

== Authorities ==
=== Mayors ===
- 2011-2014: Juan Rogelio Choque Nina.
- 2007-2010: Rogelio Leonardo Vizcarra Taco.

== Festivities ==
- Corpus Christi

== See also ==
- Puma Sulu
- Tixani

== See also ==
- Administrative divisions of Peru
