= Cuchumbaya District =

Coordinates: 16.7510°S 70.6861°W

Cuchumbaya
- District
- Interactive map of Cuchumbaya
- Country: Peru
- Region: Moquegua
- Province: Mariscal Nieto
- Founded: January 31, 1944
- Capital: Cuchumbaya

Government
  - Mayor: Guido Maquera Cuayla

Area
  - Total: 67.58 km^{2} (26.09 sq mi)
- Elevation: 3,120 m (10,240 ft)

Population (2005 census)
  - Total: 1,306
  - Density: 19.33/km^{2} (50.05/sq mi)
- Time zone: UTC-5 (PET)
- UBIGEO: 180103

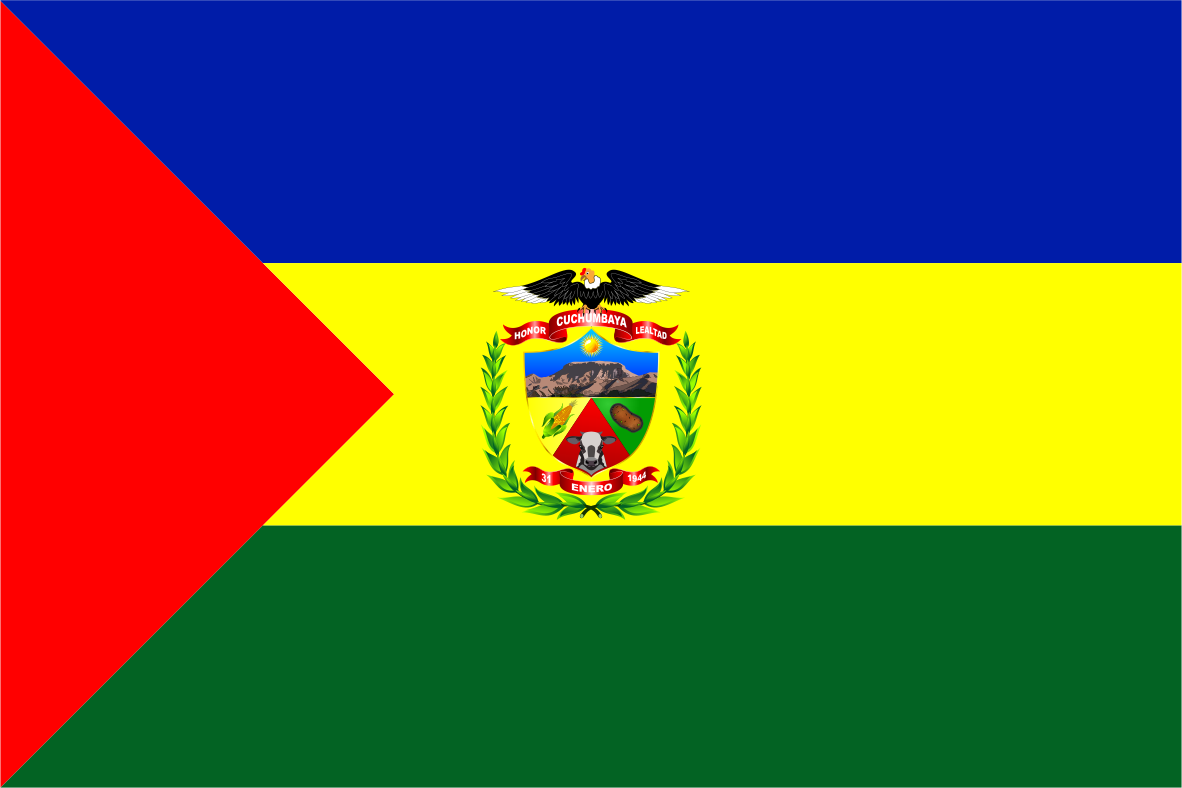
The Flag of Cuchumbaya District

Cuchumbaya District is one of six districts of the province Mariscal Nieto in Peru.

== Places of interest ==
- Tixani
