= Chiñi Lakha =

Mountain in Peru

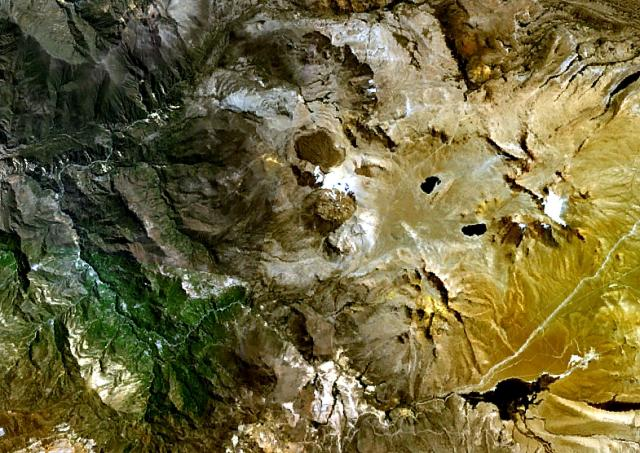
- The Tixani lava dome complex (center) as seen from above with Chiñi Lakha and Jach'a Sirka southeast of it

Highest point
- Elevation: 5,000 m (16,000 ft)
- Coordinates: 16°48′29″S 70°33′36″W

Geography
- Location within Peru
- Location: Peru, Moquegua Region
- Parent range: Andes

Chiñi Lakha (Aymara chiñi bat, lakha mouth, "bat's mouth", Hispanicized spellings Chinilaca, Chiñilaca) is a mountain in the Andes of southern Peru, about 5,000 metres (16,404 ft) high. It is located in the Moquegua Region, Mariscal Nieto Province, Carumas District. Chiñi Lakha lies southwest of Jach'a Sirka and southeast of Tixani.

Chiñi Lakha is also the name of an intermittent stream which originates north of the mountain. It flows to the west.
