= Jach'a Sirka =

Mountain in Peru

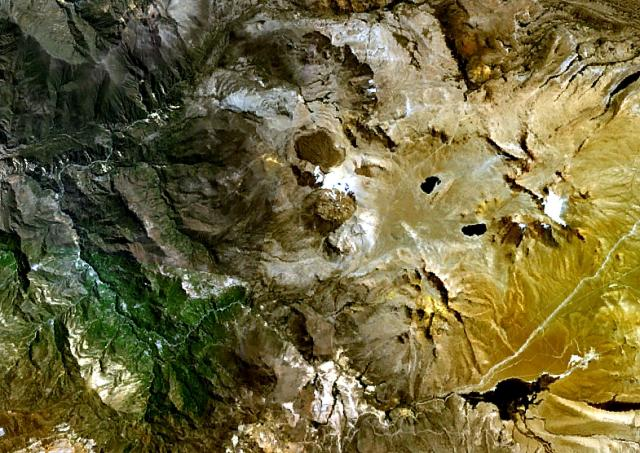
- The Tixani lava dome complex (center) as seen from above with Jach'a Sirka and Chiñi Lakha southeast of it

Highest point
- Elevation: 5,000 m (16,000 ft)
- Coordinates: 16°48′02″S 70°33′25″W

Geography
- Location within Peru
- Location: Peru, Moquegua Region
- Parent range: Andes

Jach'a Sirka (Aymara jach'a big, sirka vein of the body or a mine, "big vein", hispanicized spellings Jacha Circa, Jachacirca) is a mountain in the Andes of southern Peru, about 5,000 metres (16,404 ft) high. It is located in the Moquegua Region, Mariscal Nieto Province, Carumas District. Jach'a Sirka lies northeast of Chiñi Lakha and southeast of Tixani.
