= Jach'a K'uchu =

Mountain in Peru

- Location within Peru

Highest point
- Elevation: 5,200 m (17,100 ft)
- Coordinates: 16°42′05″S 70°00′29″W

Geography
- Location: Peru, Moquegua Region, Puno Region
- Parent range: Andes

Jach'a K'uchu (Aymara jach'a big, k'uchu, q'uch'u corner, "big corner", Hispanicized spelling Jachacucho) is a mountain in the Andes of Peru, about 5,200 metres (17,060 ft) high. It is located in the Moquegua Region, Mariscal Nieto Province, Carumas District, and in the Puno Region, El Collao Province, Santa Rosa District. It lies southwest of Qiwña Milluku and northwest of Kurawara (Curahuara). The Janq'u Jaqhi River ("white cliff", Jancoaque) originates on the east side of the mountain. It flows to the southeast.
