= Arichua (volcano) =

Mountain in Peru

Arichuwa
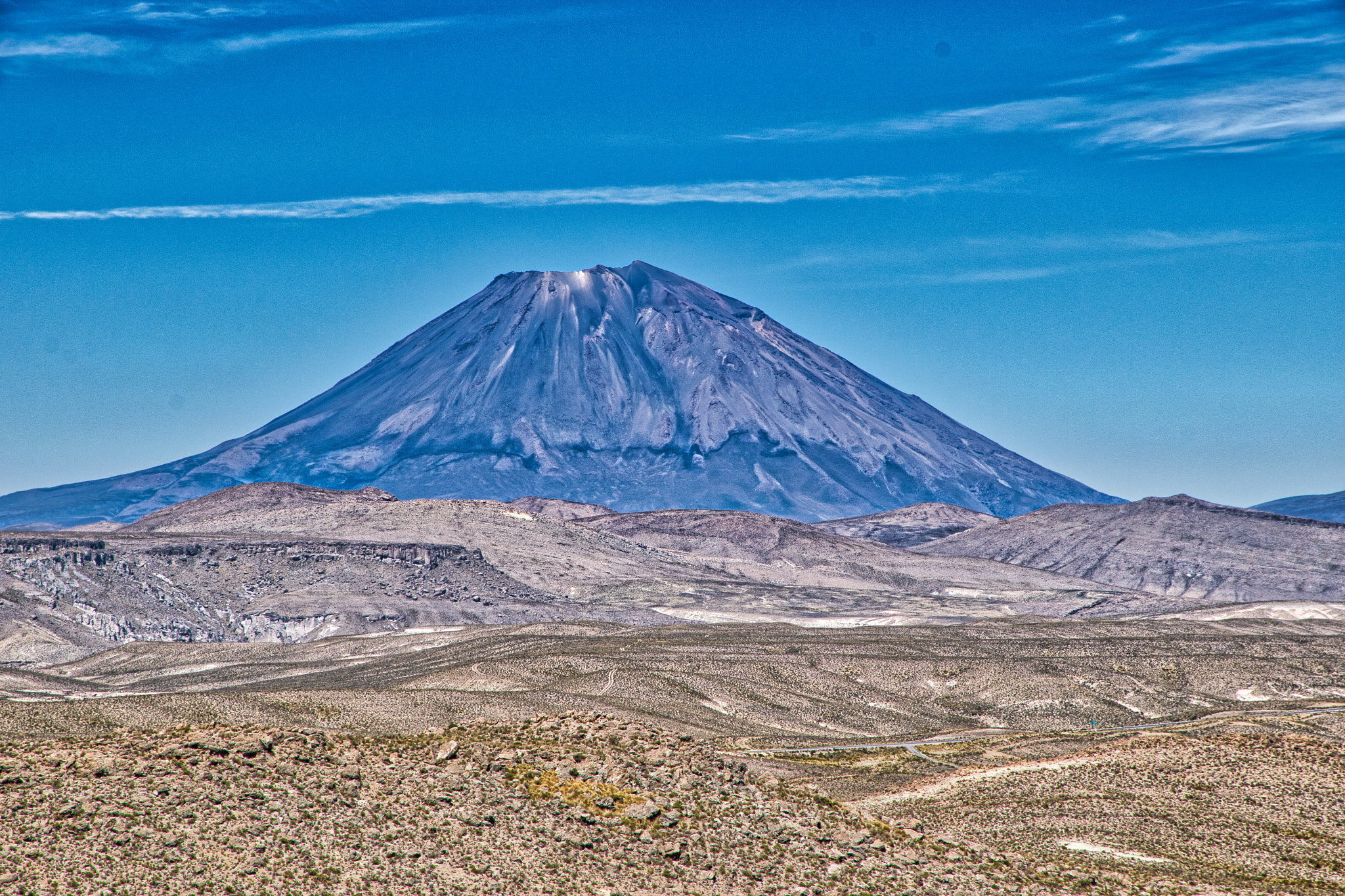

Highest point
- Elevation: 5,185 m (17,011 ft)
- Coordinates: 16°36′15″S 70°02′06″W

Geography
- Location within Peru
- Location: Peru, Puno Region
- Parent range: Andes

Arichua or Arechua (possibly from Aymara or Quechua for a kind of potatoes,) is a volcano in the Andes of Peru, about 5,185 metres (17,011 ft) high. It is located in the Puno Region, Puno Province, in the south of the Acora District. Arichua lies southwest of the mountain Coline and north of Quinaquinani.

== See also ==
- List of volcanoes in Peru
