= Acora District =

Coordinates: 15.9751°S 69.8041°W

Acora Axura
- District
- Coat of arms
- Interactive map of Acora
- Country: Peru
- Region: Puno
- Province: Puno
- Founded: May 2, 1854
- Capital: Acora

Government
  - Mayor: Gerónimo Cutipa
- Elevation: 3,867 m (12,687 ft)
- Time zone: UTC-5 (PET)
- UBIGEO: 210102
- Website: muniacora.gob.pe

Acora District is one of fifteen districts of the Puno Province in the Puno Region, Peru.

== History ==
The city of Acora and the lands that are now part of the district were once the seat of the Caciques Catacora. Acora District was created by Law on May 2, 1854, during the tenure of Ramón Castilla.

== Geography ==
One of the highest elevations of the district is Qurini at 5,400 m (17,700 ft). Other mountains are listed below:

- Arichuwa
- Chullpa
- Chullunkhäni
- Ch'allawi
- Ch'illkhani Qullu
- Ch'iyar Salla
- Jach'a Sirka
- Jach'a Suriwa
- Jaqi Jiwata
- Jichu Qullu
- Jilarata
- Kimsa Chata
- Kuntur Ikiña
- Lawani
- Llallawi
- Nasa Parqu
- Pukara
- Pukara Qullu
- Phaxcha Qullu
- Qala Chaka
- Qaqa
- Qina Qinani
- Qullu
- Qutani
- Q'iwiri
- Q'ulini
- Saywani
- Sirka Sirka
- Urqu Qullu
- Wila Qullu
- Wilaquta

== Ethnic groups ==
The people in the district are mainly indigenous citizens of Aymara descent. Aymara is the language which the majority of the population (87.14%) learnt to speak in childhood, 12.32% of the residents started speaking using the Spanish language (2007 Peru Census).

== Climate ==
Acora District has an elevation-influenced subalpine tropical climate (Köppen: Cwc) with daytime temperatures constant throughout the year, and night-time temperatures dropping below the freezing mark during the dry winter season. Diurnal temperature variation is large, averaging 13 °C (23 °F) annually.

Climate data for Rincon de la Cruz, Acora, elevation 3,887 m (12,753 ft), (1991–2020)
Month	Jan	Feb	Mar	Apr	May	Jun	Jul	Aug	Sep	Oct	Nov	Dec	Year
Mean daily maximum °C (°F)	15.0 (59.0)	14.9 (58.8)	14.8 (58.6)	15.1 (59.2)	14.7 (58.5)	14.3 (57.7)	14.2 (57.6)	14.8 (58.6)	15.6 (60.1)	16.1 (61.0)	16.4 (61.5)	16.1 (61.0)	15.2 (59.3)
Daily mean °C (°F)	9.8 (49.6)	9.8 (49.6)	9.6 (49.3)	9.0 (48.2)	7.7 (45.9)	6.5 (43.7)	6.3 (43.3)	7.0 (44.6)	8.6 (47.5)	9.5 (49.1)	10.1 (50.2)	10.3 (50.5)	8.7 (47.6)
Mean daily minimum °C (°F)	4.6 (40.3)	4.7 (40.5)	4.4 (39.9)	2.9 (37.2)	0.6 (33.1)	−1.4 (29.5)	−1.7 (28.9)	−0.8 (30.6)	1.5 (34.7)	2.9 (37.2)	3.7 (38.7)	4.4 (39.9)	2.2 (35.9)
Average precipitation mm (inches)	119.0 (4.69)	101.4 (3.99)	78.8 (3.10)	34.2 (1.35)	7.4 (0.29)	1.8 (0.07)	5.2 (0.20)	8.4 (0.33)	22.0 (0.87)	38.4 (1.51)	37.2 (1.46)	82.7 (3.26)	536.5 (21.12)
Source: National Meteorology and Hydrology Service of Peru

== Authorities ==
=== Mayors ===
- 2011-2014: Gerónimo Cutipa Cutipa.
- 2007-2010: Iván Joel Flores Quispe.

== Festivities ==
- Our Lady of the Nativity.

== See also ==
- Mulluq'u
- Q'axilu
- Q'inq'u
