= Apacheta Limani =

Mountain in Peru

- Location within Peru

Highest point
- Elevation: 5,300 m (17,400 ft)
- Coordinates: 17°00′54″S 70°27′37″W

Geography
- Location: Peru, Moquegua Region, Tacna Region
- Parent range: Andes

Apacheta Limani (possibly from Aymara apachita the place of transit of an important pass in the principal routes of the Andes; name in the Andes for a stone cairn, a little pile of rocks built along the trail in the high mountains, -ni a suffix to indicate ownership) is a mountain in the Andes of southern Peru, about 5,300 metres (17,388 ft) high. It is located in the Moquegua Region, Mariscal Nieto Province, Torata District, and in the Tacna Region, Candarave Province, Camilaca District. Apacheta Limani is situated south of the mountain Limani, northwest of the Tutupaca volcano, Chuquiananta and Huañuma, and northeast of Pomani. The Asana River originates near Apacheta Limani. It flows to the southwest.
