= Quinaquinani =

Mountain in Peru

- Location within Peru

Highest point
- Elevation: 5,200 m (17,100 ft)
- Coordinates: 16°38′00″S 70°02′12″W

Geography
- Location: Peru, Moquegua Region, Puno Region
- Parent range: Andes

Quinaquinani (possibly from Aymara qina qina an Andean cane flute; something full of holes, -ni a suffix to indicate ownership, "the one with the qina qina" or "the one with many holes") is a mountain in the Andes of Peru, about 5,200 metres (17,060 ft) high. It is situated in the Moquegua Region, Mariscal Nieto Province, Carumas District, and in the Puno Region, Puno Province, Acora District. It lies south of the mountain Arichua.
