= Qiwña Milluku =

Mountain in Peru

- Location within Peru

Highest point
- Elevation: 5,200 m (17,100 ft)
- Coordinates: 16°40′13″S 70°00′00″W

Geography
- Location: Peru, Moquegua Region, Puno Region
- Parent range: Andes

Qiwña Milluku (Aymara and Quechua qiwña polylepis, Quechua milluku, ulluku a root vegetable, Hispanicized spelling Queuñamilloco) is a mountain in the Andes of Peru, about 5,200 metres (17,060 ft) high. It is situated in the Moquegua Region, Mariscal Nieto Province, Carumas District, and in the Puno Region, El Collao Province, Santa Rosa District. It lies northeast of the mountain Jach'a K'uchu.
