= Pinkilluni =

Mountain in Peru

- Location within Peru

Highest point
- Elevation: 5,000 m (16,000 ft)
- Coordinates: 16°30′21″S 70°13′43″W

Geography
- Location: Peru, Moquegua Region, Puno Region
- Parent range: Andes

Pinkilluni (Quechua pinkillu a kind of flute, Aymara -ni a suffix to indicate ownership, "the one with a pinkillu", Hispanicized spelling Pinquillone) is a mountain in the Peruvian Andes, about 5,000 metres (16,404 ft) high. It is located in the Moquegua Region, Mariscal Nieto Province, Carumas District, and in the Puno Region, Puno Province, Pichacani District. Pinkilluni lies northwest of the mountain Q'iwiri.
