= K'ank'awini =

Mountain in Peru

- Location within Peru

Highest point
- Elevation: 5,275 m (17,306 ft)
- Coordinates: 17°00′31″S 70°30′30″W

Geography
- Location: Moquegua Region, Peru
- Parent range: Andes

K'ank'awini (Aymara k'ank'a opening, gap; crevice, -wi, -ni suffixes, "the one with a place of crevices", Hispanicized spelling Cancavine) is a 5,275-metre-high (17,306 ft) mountain in the Andes of southern Peru. It is situated in the Moquegua Region, Mariscal Nieto Province, Torata District. K'ank'awini lies west of Apachita Limani.
