= Pomani =

Mountain in Peru

- Location within Peru

Highest point
- Elevation: 5,300 m (17,400 ft)
- Coordinates: 17°4′13″S 70°28′18″W

Geography
- Location: Peru, Moquegua Region, Mariscal Nieto Province
- Parent range: Andes

Pomani (possibly from Aymara puma cougar, puma, -ni a suffix to indicate ownership, "the one with a puma") is a mountain in the Andes of southern Peru, about 5,300 metres (17,388 ft) high. It is situated in the Moquegua Region, Mariscal Nieto Province, Torata District. Pomani lies south-west of the volcano Tutupaca and north-west of the mountain Chuquiananta. The Asana River originates near the mountain.
