= Asana, Peru =

Archaeological site in Peru

Coordinates: 17°2′25.27″S 70°37′43.75″W

Asana is an archaeological site by the Asana River, a tributary of the Osmore River, in the south-central Andes of southern Peru. The site is situated at an elevation of 3,430 metres (11,250 ft), with land use documented from 3,000–4,800 metres (9,800–15,700 ft). Asana was occupied over the course of 8,000 years; though the inhabitants were initially mobile foragers, long term habitation was marked at a later phase by residential architecture.

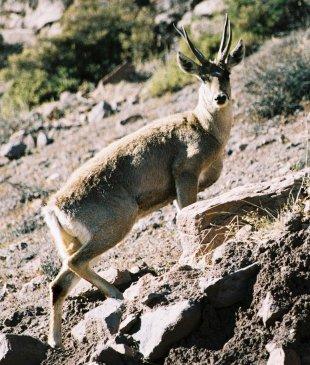
Taruca (Hippocamelus antisensis) in the northern Andean mountains.

== Geography ==
Asana is located on the north bank of the Asana River in the flat fertile valley along 11,270 feet (3,440 m) of the river. The geological and geomorphological features are causative factors for its unique setting.

== History ==
An archaeological study of the Asana river valley was conducted 1986–89. The area studied was along a river length of about 20 kilometres (12 mi), between Tumilaca Molina and Cueva Quellaveco and from the origin of the minor tributary of the river Charoque to Tala village. The valley floors and hill slopes, covering an area of 4.8 square kilometres (1.9 sq mi), led to the discovery of the Asana site and also six rock shelters. One of the rock shelters, Qusquri (Coscori), was discovered on the left bank of the river valley at an elevation of 3,000 metres (9,800 ft), in a series of river terraces at an elevation range of 3,500–3,600 metres (11,500–11,800 ft).

Human habitation has been traced to 10,500 BP at Asana. Excavations have revealed six stratigraphic zones from 10,500 BP to 3500 BP, before the site became abandoned in 3500 BP. The period from 10,500 BP to 9,000 BP is interpreted as belonging to the Late Pleistocene age, 800 years prior to any type of permanent habitation in other areas of the south central Andean highlands. During the settlement period, guanaco (Lama guanicoe) and taruka (Hippocamelus antisensis) were the local wild herbivores. Over the centuries, the guanaco were domesticated. The Asana at the lower elevation had formed the base camp of the earliest settlers who were hunter gatherers, hunting guanaco and taruca. Up to 5000 BP, settlement became more permanent. The gradual change from forager over to the pastoral society was recorded between 4800 and 4400 BP. By the mid-Holocene, guanacos had been domesticated. In the river valley, the pastorals living in the mountainous region preferred to limit their livestock foraging to a comfortable distance of not more than 2–4 kilometres (1.2–2.5 mi) with an elevation difference of 200–400 metres (660–1,310 ft), perhaps to conserve their energy expenditures. If these limits increased then they would establish new camps. Human settlement abruptly ended at Asana.

== Archaeological finds ==
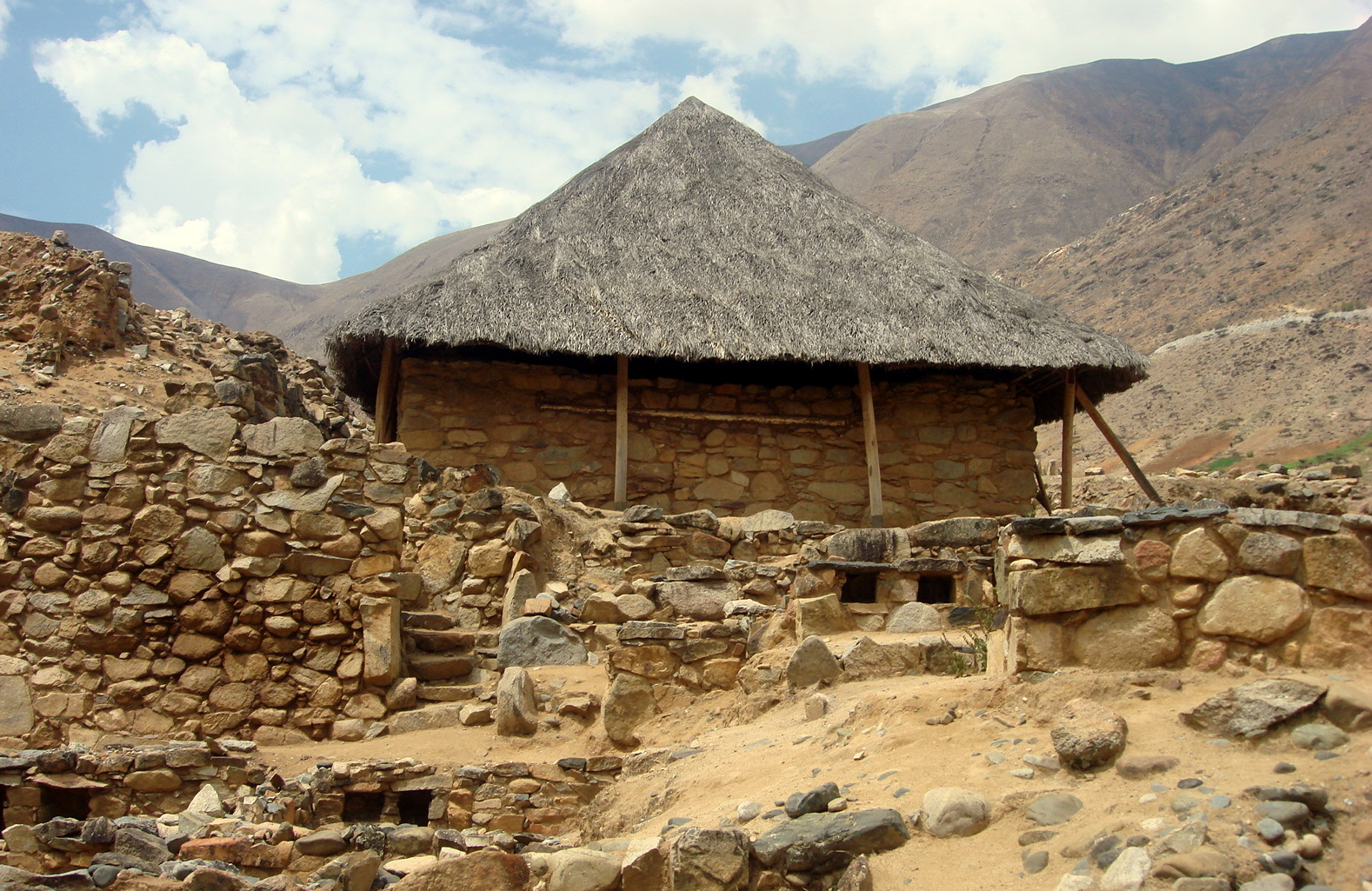
Kotosh style of structure of the pre-historic period

Lithic material found at the site attests to the shifting of camps and supports links existing between the settlements of the lower and upper elevations. Both residential and non-residential structures were found and indicated a complex type of growth and occupancy. Structure were dated between 5500 and 3600 BP. A ceremonial structure was found in an open air pre-ceramic site during excavations conducted from 1989 to 1990. It is inferred that activities occurred at the ceremonial site during a 250–500-year period; it is the earliest structure noted of the Kotosh Religious Tradition. A feature identified as a "dance ground", dated to 4800 BP, was thought to be used for "feasts and social exchanges".

== Bibliography ==
- Aldenderfer, Mark S. (1998). Montane Foragers: Asana and the South-Central Andean Archaic. Iowa City: University of Iowa Press. ISBN 978-1-58729-474-7.
- Andrea, Alfred J. (23 March 2011). World History Encyclopedia. ABC-CLIO. ISBN 978-1-85109-930-6.
- Kennett, Douglas J.; Winterhalder, Bruce (1 January 2006). Behavioral Ecology And the Transition to Agriculture. University of California Press. ISBN 978-0-520-24647-8.
