= Ya-Asana =

Island in Fiji

Ya-Asana is a small Fijian island.
