= Moquegua District =

Coordinates: 17.1938°S 70.9346°W

Moquegua
- District
- Interactive map of Moquegua
- Country: Peru
- Region: Moquegua
- Province: Mariscal Nieto
- Capital: Moquegua

Government
  - Mayor: Abraham Alejandro Cárdenas Romero (2019-2022)

Area
  - Total: 3,949.04 km^{2} (1,524.73 sq mi)
- Elevation: 1,410 m (4,630 ft)

Population (2017)
  - Total: 65,808
  - Density: 16.664/km^{2} (43.160/sq mi)
- Time zone: UTC-5 (PET)
- UBIGEO: 180101

Moquegua District is one of six districts of the province Mariscal Nieto in Peru.

== Climate ==
Climate data for Moquegua, elevation 1,420 m (4,660 ft), (1991–2020)
Month	Jan	Feb	Mar	Apr	May	Jun	Jul	Aug	Sep	Oct	Nov	Dec	Year
Mean daily maximum °C (°F)	27.0 (80.6)	27.1 (80.8)	27.4 (81.3)	26.8 (80.2)	26.7 (80.1)	26.4 (79.5)	26.5 (79.7)	27.1 (80.8)	27.3 (81.1)	27.4 (81.3)	27.3 (81.1)	27.2 (81.0)	27.0 (80.6)
Mean daily minimum °C (°F)	13.2 (55.8)	13.7 (56.7)	13.3 (55.9)	11.8 (53.2)	10.4 (50.7)	9.6 (49.3)	9.5 (49.1)	9.9 (49.8)	10.3 (50.5)	10.7 (51.3)	11.1 (52.0)	12.2 (54.0)	11.3 (52.4)
Average precipitation mm (inches)	6.3 (0.25)	6.9 (0.27)	2.8 (0.11)	0.2 (0.01)	0.0 (0.0)	0.0 (0.0)	0.1 (0.00)	0.0 (0.0)	0.0 (0.0)	0.0 (0.0)	0.0 (0.0)	0.9 (0.04)	17.2 (0.68)
Source: National Meteorology and Hydrology Service of Peru

== See also ==
- Administrative divisions of Peru
