= Q'iwiri =

Mountain in Peru

- Location within Peru

Highest point
- Elevation: 5,255 m (17,241 ft)
- Coordinates: 16°32′14″S 70°11′08″W

Geography
- Location: Peru, Moquegua Region, Puno Region
- Parent range: Andes

Q'iwiri (Aymara q'iwi a curved line; a cord wound around the hat or other things, -ri a suffix, Hispanicized spelling Quihuire) is a 5,255-metre-high (17,241 ft) mountain in the Peruvian Andes. It is located in the Moquegua Region, Mariscal Nieto Province, Carumas District, and in the Puno Region, Puno Province, in the districts Acora and Pichacani. Q'iwiri lies northwest of Qurini and north of a lake named Aqhuya Ch'alla (Pasto Grande).
