= Moquegua =

- City
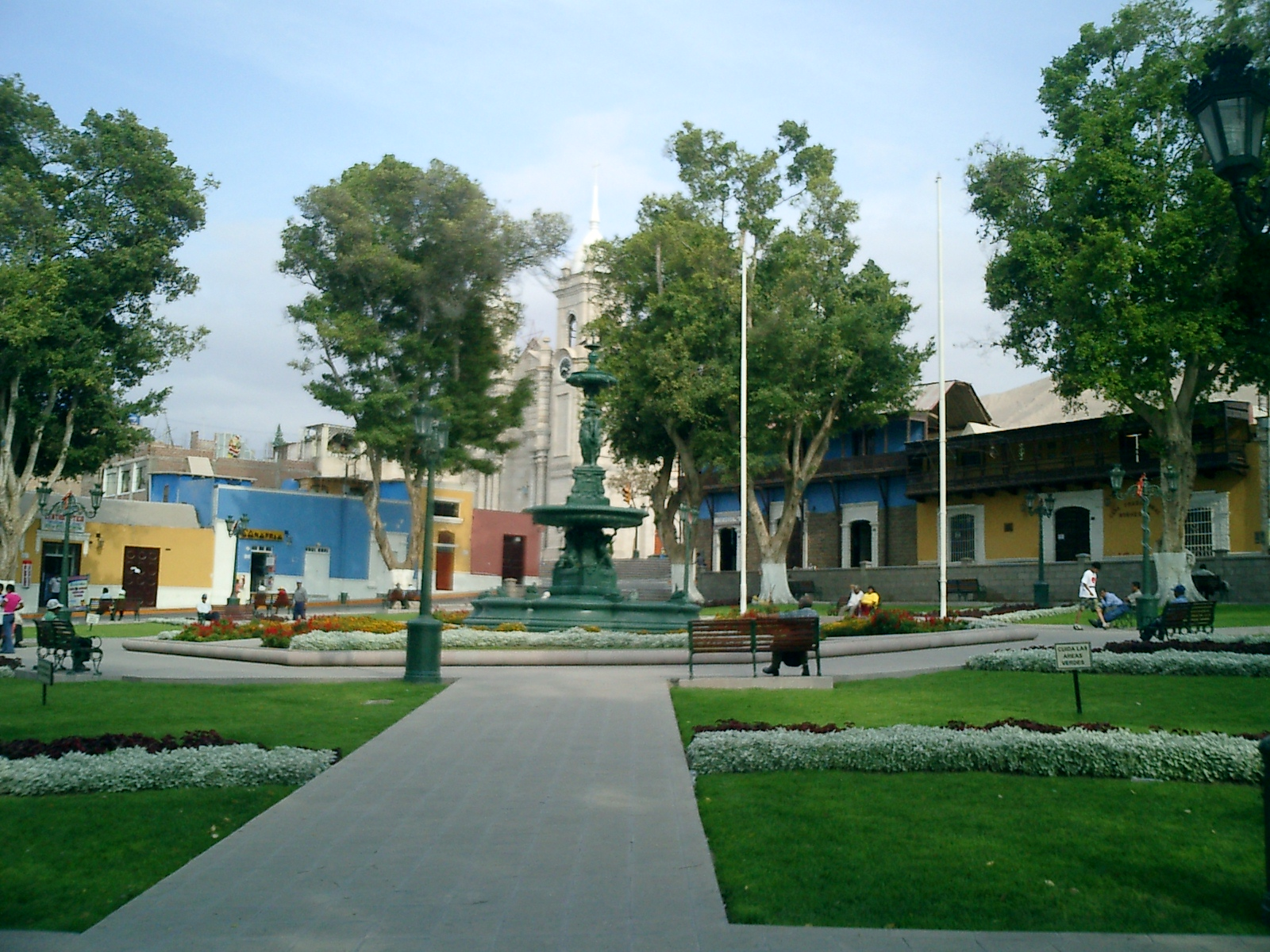
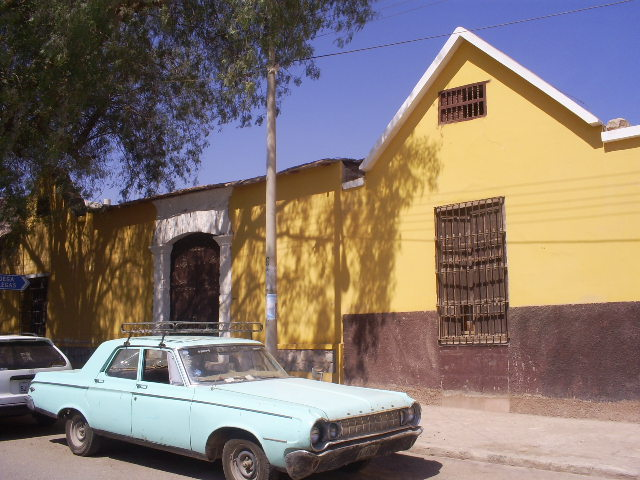
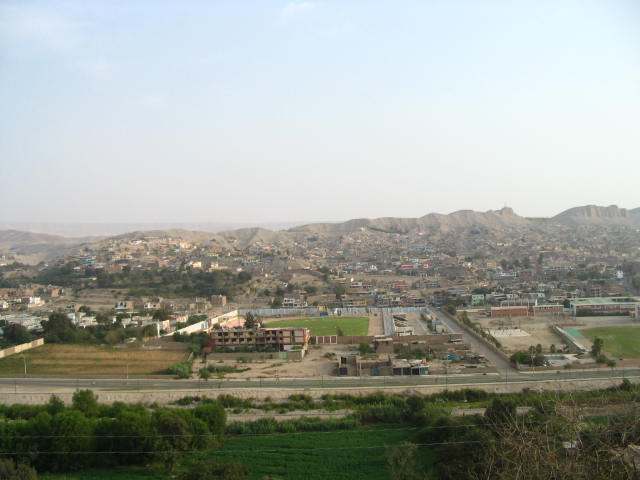
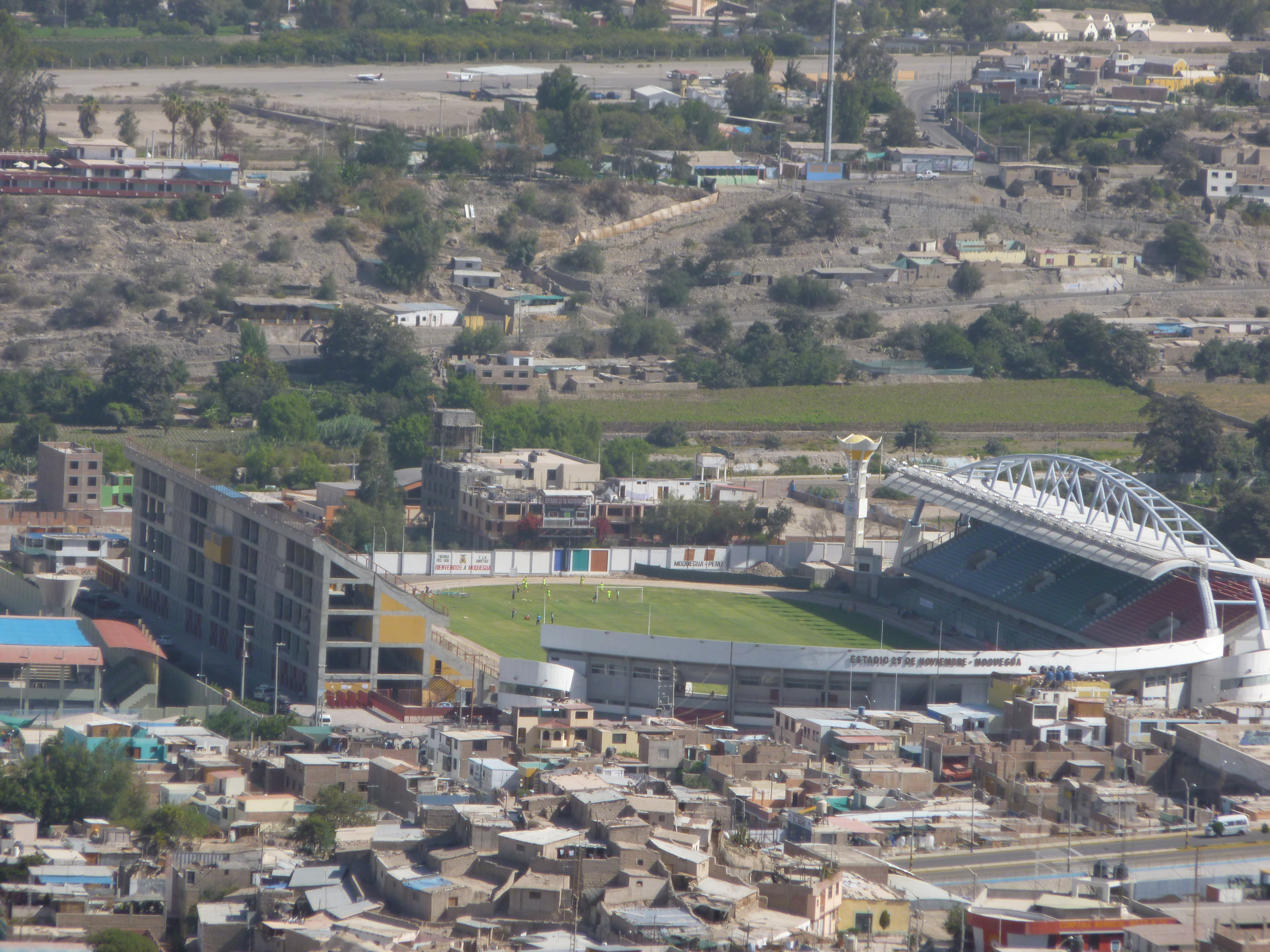
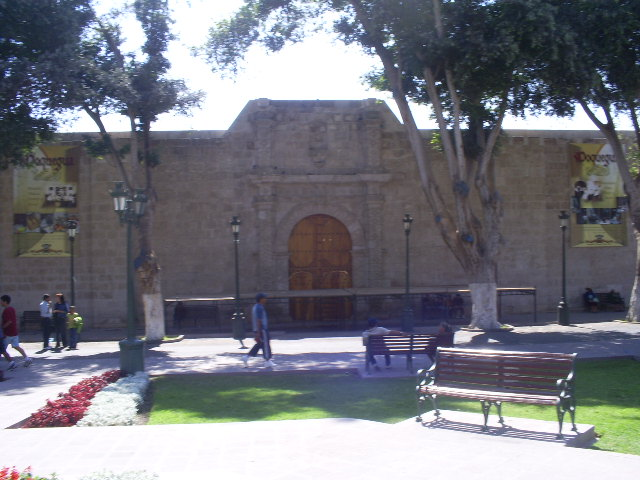
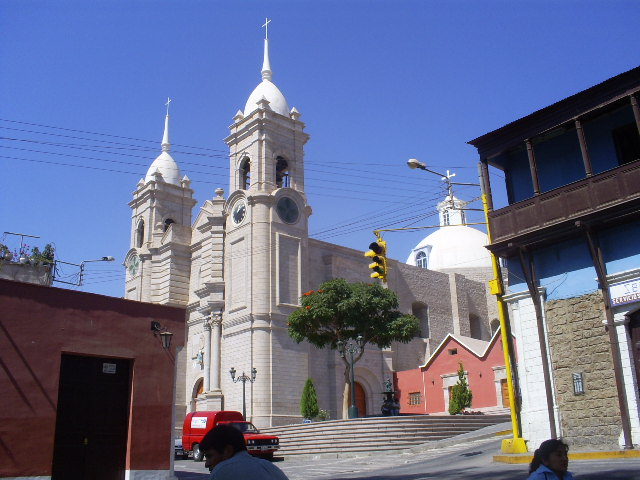
- From the top: Main square, NorVill winery, View of Moquegua, 25 November stadium, Old matrix church and Santo Domingo complex

- Flag Coat of arms

- Location within Peru
- Coordinates: 17°12′S 70°56′W
- Country: Peru
- Department: Moquegua
- Province: Mariscal Nieto
- District: Moquegua

Government
  - Mayor: Abraham Alejandro Cárdenas Romero (2019–2022)

Area
  - Total: 3,949 km^{2} (1,525 sq mi)
- Elevation: 1,410 m (4,630 ft)

Population (2017)
  - Total: 69,882
  - Estimate (2015): 60,572
  - Density: 17.70/km^{2} (45.83/sq mi)
- Demonym: Moqueguano/a
- Time zone: UTC-5 (PET)
- Postal code: 18001
- Website: Official website

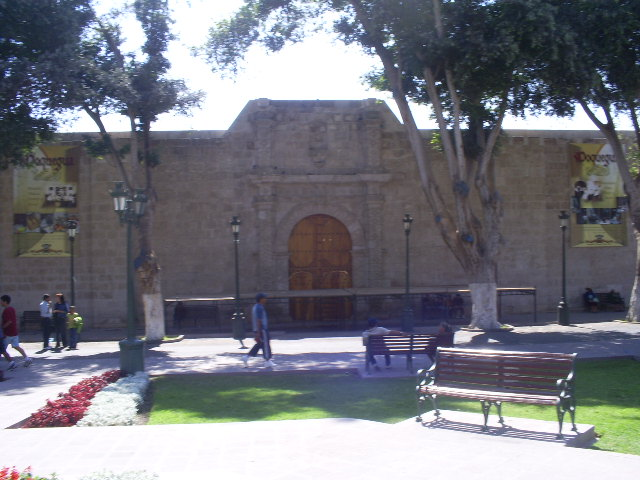
Facade of Matriz church

Moquegua (Spanish pronunciation: [moˈkeɣwa], founded by the Spanish colonists as Villa de Santa Catalina de Guadalcázar del Valle de Moquegua) is a city in southern Peru, located in the Department of Moquegua, of which it is the capital. It is also capital of Mariscal Nieto Province and Moquegua District. It is located 1144 kilometers south of the capital city of Lima.

== History ==
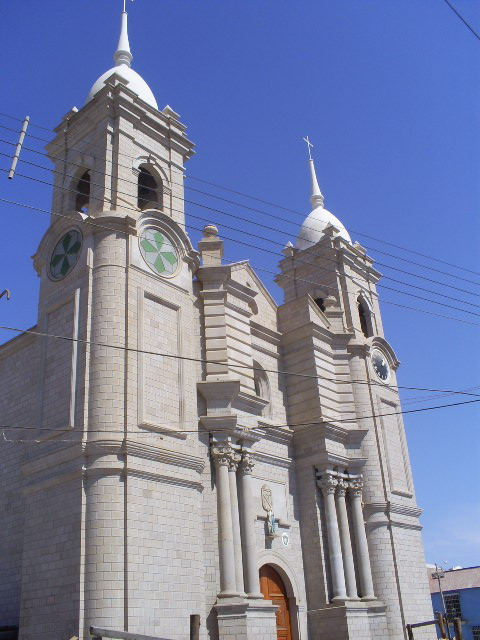
Cathedral

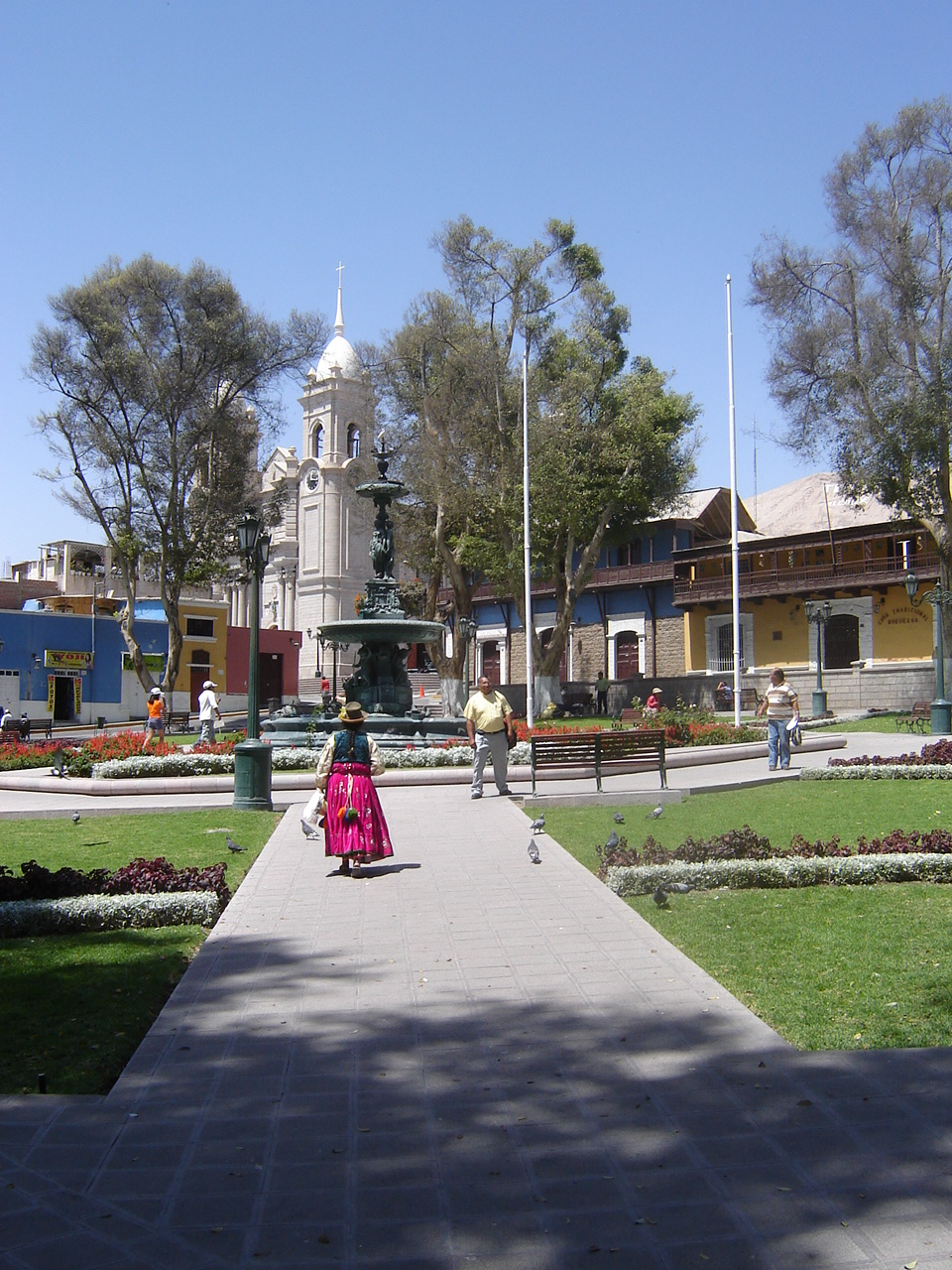
Plaza de Armas of Moquegua, designed by Gustave Eiffel

This region was occupied for thousands of years by successive cultures of indigenous peoples. The Wari culture built numerous monuments, and developed terraced fields to support crop cultivation on hillsides hundreds of years before the Inca conquered them and expanded their territory into this area. Cerro Baúl is the remains of a Wari monumental site, on top of a hill outside of Moquegua.

Numerous Tiwanaku sites are also in the area. It was an important colonial center for the Tiwanaku state. The valley is the only area of Peru to house both Wari and Tiwanaku ruins.

The Chiribaya culture flourished in the Moquegua area and near the Pacific island coast from about 1000 until 1360.

According to Inca Garcilaso de la Vega, the Inca Emperor Mayta Cápac organized the military expedition that extended the Inca domains to the shore of the Pacific. They overcame other indigenous peoples in the 15th century; in the next century they were conquered by the Spanish.

There is no definite information about the year of the city's founding by the Spanish. Tradition holds that the colonial city was founded on 25 November 1541, by Pedro Cansino and his wife Josefina de Bilbao.

== Geography ==
=== Climate ===
Climate data for Moquegua, elevation 1,420 m (4,660 ft), (1991–2020)
Month	Jan	Feb	Mar	Apr	May	Jun	Jul	Aug	Sep	Oct	Nov	Dec	Year
Mean daily maximum °C (°F)	27.0 (80.6)	27.1 (80.8)	27.4 (81.3)	26.8 (80.2)	26.7 (80.1)	26.4 (79.5)	26.5 (79.7)	27.1 (80.8)	27.3 (81.1)	27.4 (81.3)	27.3 (81.1)	27.2 (81.0)	27.0 (80.6)
Mean daily minimum °C (°F)	13.2 (55.8)	13.7 (56.7)	13.3 (55.9)	11.8 (53.2)	10.4 (50.7)	9.6 (49.3)	9.5 (49.1)	9.9 (49.8)	10.3 (50.5)	10.7 (51.3)	11.1 (52.0)	12.2 (54.0)	11.3 (52.4)
Average precipitation mm (inches)	6.3 (0.25)	6.9 (0.27)	2.8 (0.11)	0.2 (0.01)	0.0 (0.0)	0.0 (0.0)	0.1 (0.00)	0.0 (0.0)	0.0 (0.0)	0.0 (0.0)	0.0 (0.0)	0.9 (0.04)	17.2 (0.68)
Source: National Meteorology and Hydrology Service of Peru

== Tourism ==
This city is located in the mountains of the region of the same name. It has many gardens and other tourist attractions, which make it a popular destination in Peru.

The Plaza de Armas, is the Main Square and center of the city. It was designed in the 19th century by the French architect, Gustave Eiffel, who designed the Eiffel Tower in Paris. In this main square the Jose Carlos Mariategui Museum and the Contisuyo Museum, are located.

The Casa del Regidor Perpetuo de la Ciudad, is a house built in the 18th century. It has a front of carved stone. Operated as a house museum, it is furnished with high quality antiques.

The district of Torata, located 24 km away from the city, has traditional houses with mojinete roofs. The parish church has beautiful wood carvings.

The Pan-American Highway passes through the city.

== Economy ==
Moquegua's economy is largely based on mining. Resources include copper, silver, gold and molybdenum. Cuajone and part of Toquepala Mine are located in the Mcal. Nieto Province. A copper smelter and refinery to treat copper concentrates from those mines is located in Ilo province.

== See also ==
- Ilo
