= Qurini =

Mountain in Peru

- Location within Peru

Highest point
- Elevation: 5,400 m (17,700 ft)
- Coordinates: 16°35′39″S 70°10′34″W

Geography
- Location: Peru, Moquegua Region, Puno Region
- Parent range: Andes

Qurini (Aymara chuqi, quri (<Quechua) gold, -ni a suffix to indicate ownership, "the one with gold", Hispanicized spelling Corini) is a mountain in the Peruvian Andes, about 5,400 metres (17,717 ft) high. It is situated in the Moquegua Region, Mariscal Nieto Province, Carumas District, and in the Puno Region, Puno Province, Acora District. Qurini lies northwest of the mountain Wilaquta and north of the lake Aqhuyach'alla (Pasto Grande).
