= Humajalso (Moquegua) =

Mountain in Peru

- Location within Peru

Highest point
- Elevation: 5,000 m (16,000 ft)
- Coordinates: 16°52′30″S 70°32′56″W

Geography
- Location: Peru, Moquegua Region
- Parent range: Andes

Humajalso (possibly from Aymara for spring, source,) is a mountain in the Andes of southern Peru, about 5,000 m (16,000 ft) high. It is located in the Moquegua Region, Mariscal Nieto Province, Carumas District.
