= Asana River =

River in Peru

Coordinates: 17.1067°S 70.6936°W

Asana River (Río Asana) is a waterway in the Moquegua Region of southern Peru. It is one of the tributaries of the Osmore River (also known as Moquegua or Tumilaca). The Asana archaeological site, occupied over the course of 8,000 years, is situated in a basin on the river's north bank. The Quellaveco mining project sought to divert the Asana for extractive waste material placement in its copper mining operations.

== Geography ==
The Asana River is one of the four major tributaries of the Moquegua. It is situated in the south central Andes Mountains. The main Asana has its primary source at an elevation of 4,800 metres (15,700 ft). This is within the pampas in the peripheral region of the high puna, defined as an area (Pampa Tinajones and Apachita Limani) above 3,800 metres (12,500 ft) elevation. The river's runoff source is seasonal precipitation including snow melt from the western cordillera of the Andes.

One of the Asana's tributaries is the Charaque. After their confluence, the stream becomes known as Coscori. The Capillune is a tributary of the Asana. Below the elevation of 3,000 metres (9,800 ft), the many tributaries to Asana are generally dry and seasonal but the streams above this elevation demonstrate perennial flows from rainfall and snow melt. Stream discharge during the rainy season averages 2.34 cubic metres (83 cu ft)/second while in the dry season, the average was 0.53 cubic metres (19 cu ft)/second.

Ecologically the entire Asana River valley is fragile and subject to landslides. The river flows through two environmental regions. One is the puna region above 3,800 metres (12,500 ft) elevation where the climate is colder and the rainfall is also higher compared to the lower elevation areas. Vegetation and animal species found in the region are similar up to puna rim region in elevation range of 4,000–4,600 metres (13,100–15,100 ft). The valleys in this range are narrow. In the flat valley where the Asana archaeological site is located, the geological and geomorphological features are causative factors for its existence.

== Flora ==
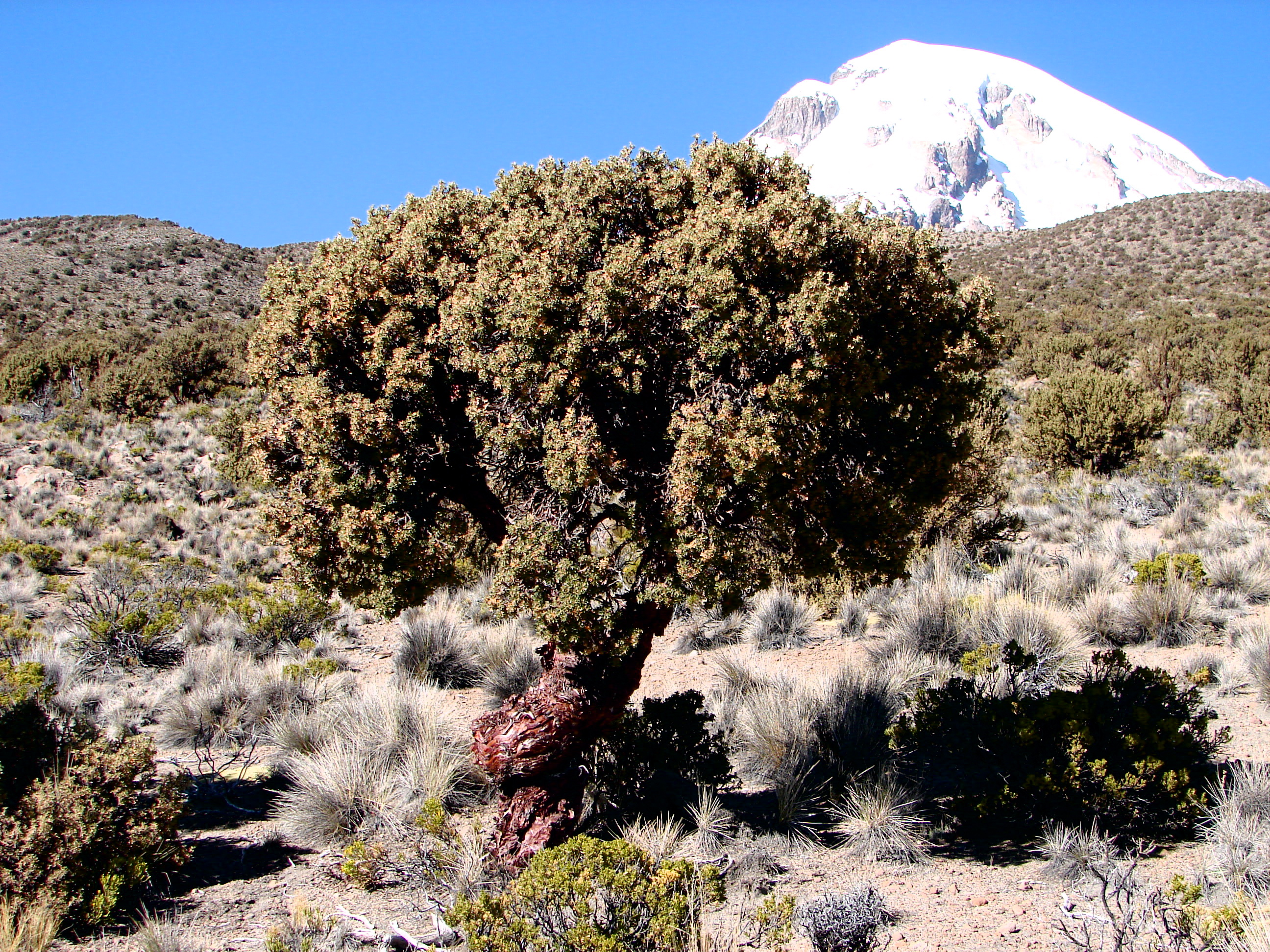
Polylepis rugulosa of the genus Polylepis, trees that grow in the Andes highland region of Peru

The lower sierra region (2,500–3,400 metres (8,200–11,200 ft)) of the Asana river valley has four plant communities; evergreen shrubs and sparsely distributed molle trees (schinus molle); perennial shrubs of Franseria meyeniana; grasses and herbs such as Chenopodium petiolare and grain quinoa (Chenopodium quinoa). Growth and yield of these plants are dependent on the rainfall.

The upper high sierra zone (3,400–3,800 metres (11,200–12,500 ft)) has 14 plant communities. Some of the species are Fabiana weberbauerii, Balbisia-Verbena Diplostephium, Cherodesma and tola (Parastrephia lepidophyllum) pampa, stipa ichu, quenua (Polylepis besseri), and in the High Sierra – Bofedales (Distchia moor).

In the puna rim (elevation 4,000–4,600 metres (13,100–15,100 ft)), the plant species are in the pampa dryland consisting of pampa and bunch grasses, and wetlands of bofedal and puna desert which is barren land. In the puna rim area, 32 species have been recorded in the dry and wetland areas. The dryland species are bunch grass species of Calamagrostits amonea, Calamagrostits bereifolia, stipa ichu, and shrub species of Parastrephia lepidopyhylum, Parastrephia lucida, Baccharis macrophylla, Chersodoma iodopappa, cactus (Opuntia atacamenis) at high altitudes, two woody plants of Azorella compacta (yareta), Polylepis besseri. The wetland species are mats of Distichia muscoides, Oxychloe andinum (khuli) over which the grasses that flourish are Calamagrostis crysantha and Calamagrostis rigescens.

== Fauna ==
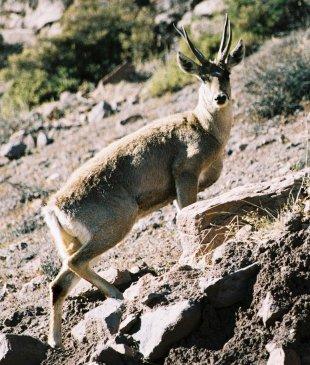
Taruca (Hippocamelus antisensis) in the northern Andean mountains.

There are several herbivores in the Asana valley. Recorded from the pre-historic period, are guanaco (Lama guanicoe) in an elevation range of 4,200 metres (13,800 ft) feeding on grasses, forbs and shrubs, and subsisting in arid conditions. Taruca (Hippocamelus antisensis) is found in elevation up to 4,600 metres (15,100 ft) in scattered forest environment of groves (quenua); they still exist in the valley. Vicuna (Vicugna vicugna) and Lama vicugna are Andean camelids found in the elevation range of 4,200–4,800 metres (13,800–15,700 ft)) which forage on vegetation of bofedal in this region. Smaller species found are vizcacha (Lagidium viscacia).

== Mining ==
In the 1960s, when the Southern Peru Copper Corporation began copper mining in the region, the Asana River valley was tapped for mining operations. The Quellaveco Company (a consortium of Anglo-American Company of South Africa and International Finance Corporation of the World Bank) operated here since 1992. Quellaveco proposed a river diversion project on the Asana River in 2000 which involved the building of a 7.2 kilometres (4.5 mi) canal which would use 700 liters (150 imp gal; 180 U.S. gal) per second of water for open pit mining to extract about 64,000 tons of copper, and other minerals, over a forty-year period. However, the environmental impact assessment (EIA) carried out by Quellaveco confirmed the negative impact of this diversion. The EIA suggested that an unacceptable level of water resource exploitation would occur. Other issues noted were resettlement of local population as well as the pollution of aquifers and land area caused by discharge of tailing effluents. During 2002–03, the local population held protests against the diversion project in view of its large negative impacts. As of 2007, no license had been issued for this project.

== Bibliography ==
- Aldenderfer, Mark S. (1998). Montane Foragers: Asana and the South-Central Andean Archaic. University of Iowa Press. ISBN 978-1-58729-474-7.
- Andrea, Alfred J. (23 March 2011). World History Encyclopedia. ABC-CLIO. ISBN 978-1-85109-930-6.
- Kennett, Douglas J.; Winterhalder, Bruce (1 January 2006). Behavioral Ecology And the Transition to Agriculture. University of California Press. pp. 172–. ISBN 978-0-520-24647-8.
- Rice, Prudence M. (15 December 2011). Vintage Moquegua: History, Wine, and Archaeology on a Colonial Peruvian Periphery. University of Texas Press. ISBN 978-0-292-74254-3.
