= Wilaquta (Moquegua-Puno) =

Mountain in Peru

- Location within Peru

Highest point
- Elevation: 5,100 m (16,700 ft)
- Coordinates: 16°36′56″S 70°09′22″W

Geography
- Location: Peru, Moquegua Region, Puno Region
- Parent range: Andes

Wilaquta (Aymara wila blood, blood-red, quta lake, "red lake", Hispanicized spelling Huilacota) is a mountain in the Peruvian Andes, about 5,100 metres (16,732 ft) high. It is situated in the Moquegua Region, Mariscal Nieto Province, Carumas District, and in the Puno Region, Puno Province, Acora District. Wilaquta lies north of the lake Aqhuyach'alla (Pasto Grande) and southeast of the mountain Qurini.
