= Chuquiananta =

Mountain in Peru

- Location within Peru

Highest point
- Elevation: 5,300 m (17,400 ft)
- Coordinates: 17°4′53″S 70°26′58″W

Geography
- Location: Moquegua Region, Mariscal Nieto Province, Tacna Region, Candarave Province, Peru
- Parent range: Andes

Chuquiananta (possibly from Aymara chuqi gold, Quechua chuqi metal, gold (<Aymara), every kind of precious metal) is a mountain in the Andes of southern Peru, about 5,300 metres (17,388 ft) high. It is situated in the Moquegua Region, Mariscal Nieto Province, Torata District, and in the Tacna Region, Candarave Province, Camilaca District. Chuquiananta lies south-west of Tutupaca volcano, south-east of Pomani.
