= Department of Moquegua =

Department of Peru

Moquegua Mukiwa (Aymara) / Muqiwa (Quechua)
- Department
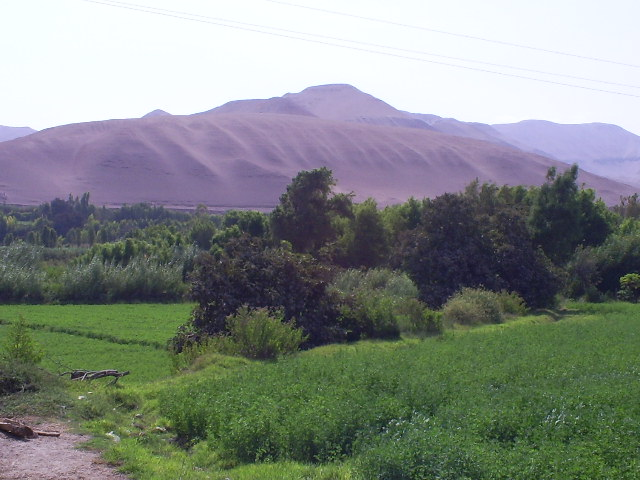
- Moquegua valley

- Flag Coat of arms

- Location of Moquegua within Peru
- Coordinates: 16.8°S 70.8°W
- Country: Peru
- Capital: Moquegua
- Provinces: List: General Sánchez Cerro; Ilo; Mariscal Nieto

Government
  - Type: Regional Government
  - Governor: Zenón Cuevas Pare

Area
  - Total: 15,733.97 km^{2} (6,074.92 sq mi)
- Highest elevation: 3,756 m (12,323 ft)
- Lowest elevation: 0 m (0 ft)

Population (2025)
  - Total: 194,842
  - Density: 12.3835/km^{2} (32.0732/sq mi)
- Demonym: mogueguano/a
- UBIGEO: 18
- Dialing code: 053
- ISO 3166 code: PE-MOQ
- Principal resources: Copper, olives and avocado.
- Poverty rate: 29.6%
- Percentage of Peru's GDP: 1.43%
- Website: www.regionmoquegua.gob.pe

Moquegua (Spanish pronunciation: [moˈkeɣwa]; Mukiwa (Aymara); Muqiwa (Quechua)) is a department of Peru. It is located in the country's south, extending from the coast to its highlands. It is administered by a regional government. Its capital is the city of Moquegua, which is among the main Peruvian cities for its high rates of GDP and national education.

== Geography ==
The department's volcanoes and its geomorphology make its geography remarkable. It is formed by upstream portion of the Tambo River, one of the most torrential coastal rivers, which forms deep valleys that can be divided into three sectors, the first one being in the northwest, forming the Puquina-La Capilla sector. These are veritable oasis enclaved in the rocks; arid hillsides and some terraces where horticulture is possible. High quality alfalfa as well as fruits, especially grapes, are produced here, due to a good climate and a rich soil. The second sector is the valley of Omate, one of the most populated and fertile soils of the department. The Ubinas Volcano, Peru's most active volcano, is located nearby. In the hillsides, the land is fertile in contrast with the desolation and sterility of its highlands. In the southern part of the Tambo River is located the town of Carumas, which along with Puquina and Omate, are the vital centers of this geography. The Moquegua River is a short run one and is formed by its tributaries: the Torata, Huaracane and Tumilaca rivers. After passing through the regional capital, it digs deep into a canyon called the Osmare.

=== Boundaries ===
The Department of Moquegua is bordered by the Arequipa Region in the north, the Puno Region in the east, the Tacna Region in the south and the Pacific Ocean in the west.

== Political division ==
Map of provinces

The region is divided into three provinces (Spanish: provincias, singular: provincia), which are composed of 20 districts (distritos, singular: distrito). The provinces, with their capitals in parentheses, are:

- General Sánchez Cerro (Omate)
- Ilo (Ilo)
- Mariscal Nieto (Moquegua)

== Demographics ==
=== Population ===
According to the 1993 census, the Moquegua Region has a population of 128,747 inhabitants, 51.9% of which (66,843) are male and 48.1% (61,904) are female.

As of 2002, the Instituto Nacional de Estadística e Informática estimates the region's population to be 156,750.

According to the adjusted 2025 census results, 194,842 people lived in Moquegua.

=== Languages ===
According to the last census in Peru in 2007, the languages learnt first by the residents were Spanish (79.37%), Aymara (10.71%), Quechua (9.57%) and Asháninka (0.04%). Other indigenous languages were learnt first by 0.19% and foreign languages by 0.04%. The Quechua variety spoken in Moquegua is Cusco–Collao Quechua. The following table shows the results concerning the language learnt first in the Moquegua Region by province:

Province	Quechua	Aymara	Asháninka	Another native language	Spanish	Foreign language	Deaf or mute	Total
G. Sánchez Cerro	8,905	470	5	22	14,354	3	22	23,781
Ilo	2,735	5,138	19	117	52,519	36	27	60,591
Mariscal Nieto	3,093	10,875	31	154	55,268	23	65	69,509
Total	14,733	16,483	55	293	122,141	62	114	153,881
%	9.57	10.71	0.04	0.19	79.37	0.04	0.07	100.00

=== Immigration ===
Persons originating from other regions of the country make up 37.8% of the population and 0.2% of residents were born abroad.

The largest immigrant groups come from the Puno Region (14.7% of the total population) and the Arequipa Region (9.9%).

=== Age ===
The population age distribution is 43.3% under the age of 20, 9.9% from 20 to 24, 28.6% from 25 to 44, 13.4% from 45 to 64, and 4.8% who are 65 years of age or older.

=== Education ===
Secondary education has been attended by 33.3% of the population and 5.5% also have graduated from non-university higher education, while 4.3% have complete university studies. 37.9% only have attended primary education and 7.1% have not had any education.

The illiteracy rate in the region is 10%.

== History ==
Inca oral tradition as documented by the Spanish chroniclers has long held that the present-day Moquegua Region was inhabited by small groups of natives known as pukinas and qullas long before the arrival of the Incas. According to chronicler Garcilaso de la Vega, it was Inca Mayta Cápac who organized the military expedition to expand the domains of the Cusco monarchs along this part of the coast. Since these were fertile lands, capable of supporting a larger population, the Inca army officers in charge decided to establish the towns of Cuchuna and Moquegua. In doing so, they were also protecting the Inca domain over the conquered lands.

Archaeological research conducted over the past several decades has shed considerable light on the ancient history of Moquegua, giving this remote section of Peru a unique place in the history of Peru. Archaeological surveys and excavations, documented in myriad professional publications, as well as books for the public available at Moquegua's Museo Contisuyo, demonstrate a sequence of occupation stretching from more than 10,000 B.C. through the present day.

There is no accurate data on the Spanish conquest or the founding of the city of Moquegua by its army. Presumably, it was founded on 25 November 1541 by Pedro Cansino and his wife, Josefa de Bilbao.

During the War of the Pacific, Moquegua suffered the invasion of Chilean troops. They looted all buildings —including churches— tortured women, and took people's jewelry.

== Tourism ==
=== In the city ===
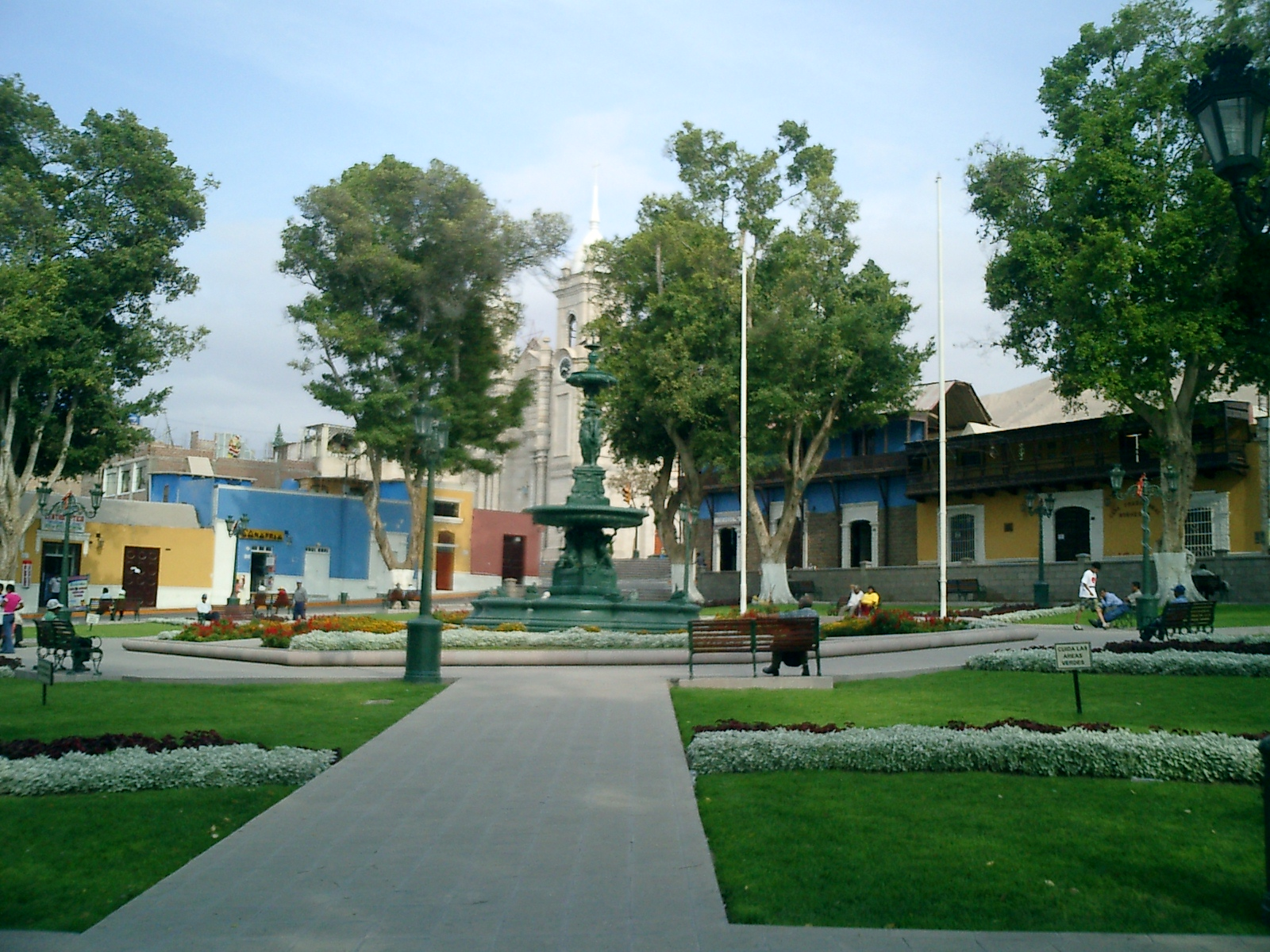
Plaza de Armas in the city of Moquegua, the background shows the city's cathedral.

The attractions in the city of Moquegua are Main Square which features a fountain made and built in France by the Engineer Gustave Eifel, Santo Domingo Church contains the image of Santa Fortuna, a martyr, from the first centuries of Christianity who is worshipped by the faithful. The Jose Carlos Mariategui Museum is located in the main square and it presents the life and works of who is widely considered one of the most influential intellectuals of the 20th Century in Latin America. Contisuyo Museum is also located in the city of Moquegua. The museum exhibits a variety of archaeological remains of the Uros and Puquina cultures as well as an explanation of the time period in which different cultures settle in this region.

Other attractions in the city are casa del regidor perpetuo de la ciudad and casa de Alayza, which are houses built with architecture of the eighteenth century.

=== Outside the city ===
Attractions outside the city are Samegua which has the best typical food restaurants for tourists. Samegua also produces good quality avocados which are the reason why it's called the avocado territory. Another attraction located 24 km (15 mi) from Moquegua is Torata that is a district that offers the visitor a picturesque environment in which the visitor can admire the traditional ridged roof houses, the Torata Church, the stone windmills from the viceroyal period, and Sabaya and Camata an Inca administrative center known as the Machu Picchu of Moquegua. In addition at about 18 km (11 mi) northeast of Moquegua is found Mount Baul a geological formation which appear to have been cut perpendicular in the top area and it also bears a resemblance to the type of chest of trunk that was utilized all over Peru in the old days.

Another attraction outside of the city is Ilo located 90 km (56 mi) from Moquegua. Ilo is one of the most tourist visited places in Moquegua. The main places to visit in this town are: Punta Coles, Los Olivares, and El Puerto, La Glorieta Jose Galvez, San Geronino church and beautiful beaches like Roca del Rio.

Also at about 140 km (87 mi) northwest of Moquegua is Omate, town known as Villa de Omate that produces pisco and wine. The town is also considered to be one of the most important producing centers in Peru. The attractions in Omate are The Viceroyal Church, the Quinistacas Sanctuary, the Utucam Thermal baths, and the Tambo river. Other places of interest in the Outskirts of Moquegua are Puente Bello, Putina, Ichuna and Tolapalca thermal baths.

=== Festivities ===
In Moquegua there are two main Festivities that attract tourist; one of them is Santo Domingo Fortunata Festival. This festival is held on 14 October; it is an important religious festival in which the faithful from not only Moquegua but different places in Peru traveled to this town to join the Procession of the Image of the virgin and martyr St. Fortunata. Activities such as fairs, cultural and recreational events occur in this festival too.

The other main festival for the region of Moquegua is Moquegua Tourism Week. This festival starts in November and it holds competitions of typical dishes and beverages, a show with typical dances, and fairs.

=== Gastronomy ===
The Region of Moquegua offers a variety of typical food to his visitors. Some of the typical dishes offered are patasca moqueguana or Caldo de Mondogo, which is a soup made with cow innards, corn, and mint and Picante de Cuy that is Guinea pig stew cooked in a peanut and hot pepper sauce. Other typical dishes are Chupe de Camarones that is a shrimp soup made with eggs, milk, and oregano. There is also the well known, Cebiche de Jurel or Mixto, Parihuela, Chupin de Pejesapo, Sudado de machas, Aguadito de Mariscos, Chicharron de Pulpo, Picante de Mariscos, and Cuy Frito.

The most typical desserts in the Moquegua region are majarblanco which is a sweetened, condensed milk cooked down and used as a spread, alfar de penco which is a soft cookie, corn cake, guargueros, and oquendos. The most traditional drinks are macerado de damasco which is a peach liqueur made with Pisco, leche de monja, a liqueur that is made with a cordial, eggs, and lemon. Other traditional drinks are Chimbango de tres higos a liqueur combined of red, black, and green figs. In addition wine, pisco, licorice, cognac, and other pisco based fruit liqueurs are traditional drinks of this region.

=== Transportation and Tourist Information ===
Modes of transportation to Moquegua Region are by air or overland transport. The Moquegua Region has two airports: Hernan Turque Podesta Airport in Moquegua city and Ilo Airport located in Ilo. Overland transportation in Moquegua city is by bus, and in Ilo there is a bus station called Pampa Inalambrica.

== See also ==
- 2001 southern Peru earthquake
