= Timeline of the 2022–2023 Peruvian protests =

This is a broad timeline of the 2022–2023 Peruvian protests against the government of Dina Boluarte and the Congress of Peru, sparked by the self-coup attempt of President Pedro Castillo, who was later arrested for his actions. The protests were organized by social organizations and indigenous peoples who felt they experienced political disenfranchisement, specifically on the politically left-wing to far left, with the groups demanding immediate general elections and a constituent assembly to draft a new Constitution of Peru.

== 2022 ==
=== 7 December ===
Lima is one of the cities that were summoned. After the message to the nation, it was denounced that the Minister of the Interior, Willy Huerta, ordered the doors of the congress to be opened, which were closed, so that the summoned protesters could storm the congress. However, due to the failure of his self-coup attempt and the subsequent vacancy by the Congress of the Republic, the demonstrations increased. On 7 December, between one and two hundred people gathered in the "Toma de Lima" in the Plaza San Martín and surroundings. However, after the events of the vacancy and detention, the protesters mainly occupied Abancay avenue, which was guarded by police to avoid entering the congress. The RPP outlet considered the pro-government meeting as the largest since Castillo came to power. However, the pro-Castillo mobilization got out of control when they attacked and insulted a journalist in front of the cameras. Panic buying was registered by the population fearing an escalation of events. According to the Voice of America, nearly a thousand people participated on 9 December events.

Some of the first demonstrations were made from the Plaza de Armas of Cuzco, with protesters clashing with other citizens against the self-coup attempt.

In Arequipa, the demonstrations were held from the Plaza de Armas simultaneously with the message to the Nation that lasted briefly with hundreds of people, then they were held again spontaneously. Although the protesters lack a leader, they received support from labor unions such as the Arequipa Departmental Federation of Workers, the Civil Construction Union, and the National Front of Transporters and Drivers of Peru.

The demonstrations were held in the city of Puno on 7 December, whose four congressmen representing the homonymous department elected to abstain in the vacancy motion. These had the support of the president of the Unified Defense Front against the contamination of the Coata basin and Lake Titicaca, who called for new demonstrations between 13 and 15 December. It also received the support of the regional Sutep, which ignored Boluarte's election and declared a permanent mobilization. Dozens of people gathered, which over time expanded to other provinces of San Román and El Collao.

=== 8 December ===
Blockades were made to the interprovincial highway in Arequipa. The same happened with the nearby Majes-Siguas sector, where initially there was no predominant police presence.

=== 9 December ===
The Superintendence of Land Transportation of People, Cargo and Merchandise announced in a statement that the transportation sector in southern Peru was suspended, where the Panamericana Sur highway is partially blocked. By 9 December, passengers and the police tried unsuccessfully to negotiate with the protesters.

In the city of La Joya, Arequipa where the Panamericana Sur is located, ollas comúnes were made. It is estimated that around 10,000 people participated in these areas of the Arequipa department on 9 December. To expedite traffic, the head of the Police and Public Order Division ordered the deployment of 150 police officers, despite not counting a Minister of the Interior between 9 and 10 December or an emergency decree.

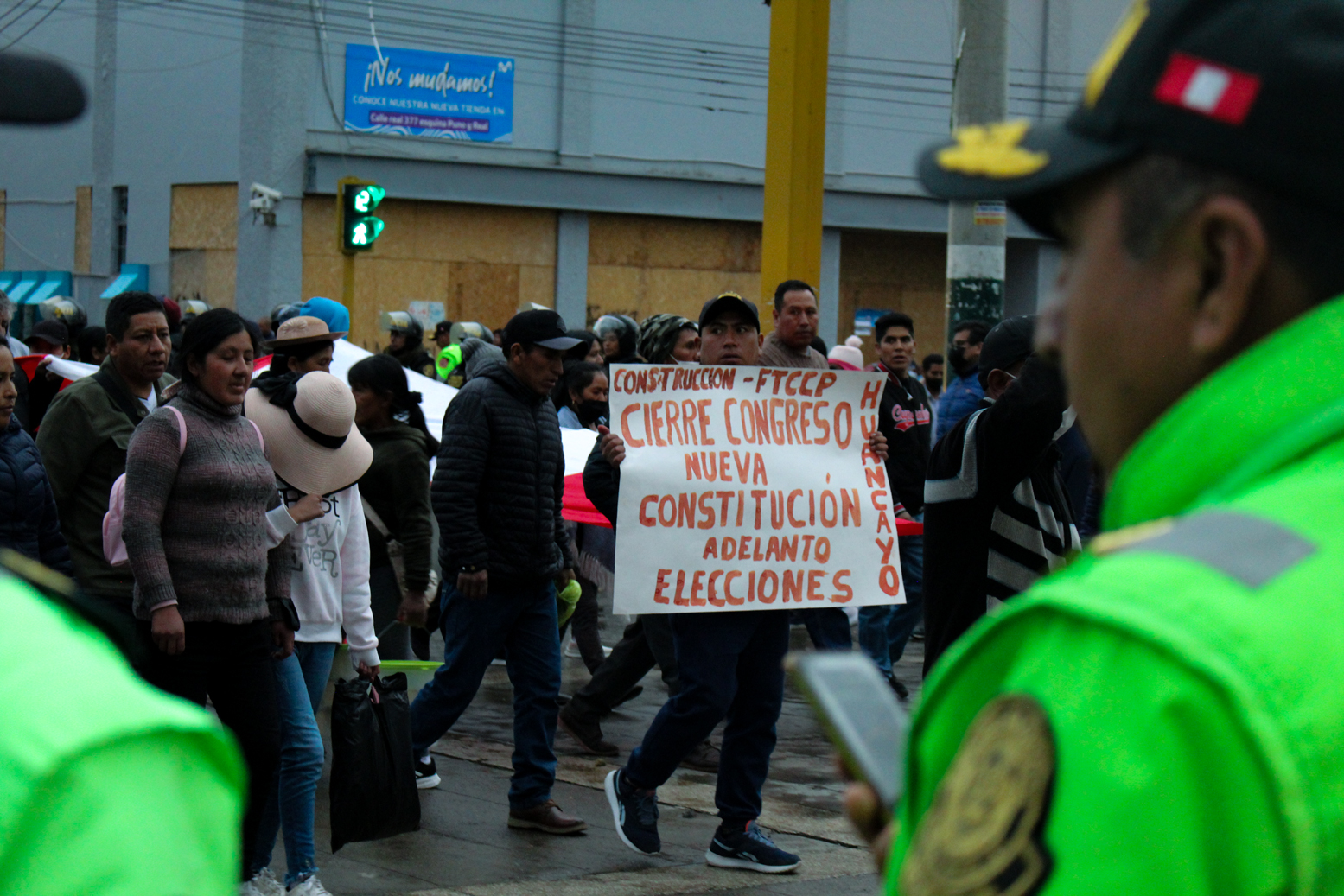
A protester in Huancayo holding a sign demanding the closure of Congress, a new constitution and new general elections

In Ayacucho, the Ayacucho People's Defense Front mobilized from the city, an organization that was restructured during the protests "in other regions because we are creating a national front that will have a historical role in respecting the clamor of the people." During the protest, local social organizations described departmental congressmen Alex Flores, Margot Palacios and Germán Tacuri as "traitors to the homeland." The Ayacucho Agrarian Federation also expressed its support for the dissolution of the congress. At the same time, from the Pampa de Ayacucho, the Summit of the Governor and Mayors of Latin America was held to meet the requests of the political crisis without the participation of the Executive and Legislative powers of Peru.

In Puno, protests also took place in the main square of Juliaca. For their side, the National Federation of Workers in the Education Sector confirmed through the local teachers' union a 24-hour strike and the declaration of persona non grata to congressmen Flavio Cruz, Oscar Zea, Carlos Zeballos and Flores Ancachi for supporting the vacancy motion.

=== 10 December ===
The prices of the tickets from the Tacna bus terminal to Arequipa and Lima double. Land access between Cusco and Arequipa via Canchis was also blocked. Among the affected passengers are applicants for the Public Teachers Career held on 9 December.

On the South Pan-American Highway in Ica, the protesters blocked three sectors of the province of Ica (Barrio Chino, La Expansión Urbana, and El Álamo), which are closed to the blockade carried out in La Joya (Arequipa), with tires, stones and other elements. This first led to the arrest of several heavy-duty vehicles according to the Highway Protection Unit of the National Police and also prevented access to Cuzco. On the morning of 10 December, according to the newspaper Correo, the police only unblocked kilometer 48 of the penetration highway to Arequipa.

There were violent confrontations between community members and residents of Andahuaylas against police officers. With 3,000 people participating, during the afternoon, the protesters took 2 policemen hostage and requested a "prisoner exchange". In light of this, a division of special forces from Abancay of the PNP moved to Andahuaylas and arrived in a small plane. Hours after the kidnappings, the demonstrators released the police officers and numerous social organizations from the department of Apurimac declared themselves in a "popular insurgency" and will begin a regional strike starting Monday, 12 December. Clashes erupted in the city between protestors and police in the city. Two protestors, aged 15 and 18, were killed by police shooting from a helicopter, while four more were injured, one of whom critically. In addition, with the new confrontations at the Huacabamba airport, they managed to vandalize the area from burning tires to damaging stores. It is estimated that 50 members of the PNP and collaborators are in these facilities.

Hundreds of protesters gathered peacefully during the day. The San Marcos University Federation (FUSM) joined the march. The great expectation was the arrival of Antauro Humala and his reservists in Lima at 6 pm, which is why there was a great concentration during those hours. The ethnocacerist leader gave a press conference in the Plaza San Martín de Lima where he recognized the government of Dina Boluarte and did not say at any time that he would lead or his party would massively support the marches, which is why he was booed and expelled from the square. After the incident, the numerous demonstrators marched towards the congress and had a confrontation with a police contingent.

In Arequipa, the Region's Popular Struggle Committee announced on 10 December that they would carry out strikes for three days in response "to the kidnapping of Peru and President Pedro Castillo by economic groups and the coup of the congress." The protests grew from other sectors when the Arequipa Regional Teachers Union joined, which in addition to washing the flag demanded compliance with the educational initiatives of the former president, and merchants from the commercial platform Andrés Avelino Cáceres. On the other hand, the representative of the group of ethnocaceristas did not rule out that there are militants involved in the protests. Artisanal miners took part of the road in the Chala District.

=== 11 December ===
During protests in Chincheros, leaked police audio revealed police asking for reinforcements after the Public Ministry and police station were set ablaze, with police stating "We need support in Chincheros! Let a helicopter come to disperse people. There are only 30 of us. We are running out of ammunition, we have injured policemen".

It was announced that the Cusco Departmental Federation of Workers (FDTC), the Túpac Amaru Cusco Agrarian Revolutionary Federation (Fartac), the Cusco University Federation (FUC), the Sutep and the Cusco Regional Youth Assembly (Arejo) that they will unite the mobilizations and that they will attack the indefinite strikes. The peasant organization announced a delegation to Lima.

=== 12 December ===
President Boluarte removed 26 regional prefects nominated by Castillo from their positions.

The Gloria dairy facility in Arequipa, one of the largest in Peru, was occupied by protesters who looted the plant and destroyed objects. It was also reported that rioters seized Rodríguez Ballón International Airport, and razed portions of it, resulting in its closure.

=== 13 December ===
Alejandro Velasco Astete International Airport is closed in Cusco, with LATAM Airlines Group and Sky Airline reporting that flights in the region would continue to be cancelled. The United States Ambassador to Peru, Lisa D. Kenna, travels to the Government Palace to meet with President Boluarte.

=== 14 December ===
The Boluarte government announced a national state of emergency, removing some constitutional protections from citizens, including the rights preventing troops from staying within private homes and buildings, the freedom of movement, the freedom of assembly, and "personal freedom and security" for 30 days.

=== 15 December ===
- Peruvian Army firing live ammunition at protesters in Ayacucho

The Boluarte government decreed a curfew for fifteen provinces in eight different regions of Peru on 15 December, in regions including Arequipa, La Libertad, Ica, Apurímac, Cusco, Puno, and Huancavelica.

During protests in Ayacucho, demonstrators approached the Coronel FAP Alfredo Mendívil Duarte Airport, with the Peruvian Armed Forces closing the airport in response, with clashes occurring shortly after. Human rights groups reported that members of the Peruvian Army were seen shooting at civilians protesting in Ayacucho. Casualties were sent for treatment at the Huamanga Network and in the Ayacucho Regional Hospital, with 90% of injuries resulting from gunshot wounds according to the Ayacucho regional health system. The response by authorities caused the collapse of hospital systems in the city, with protesters suffering from gunshot wounds being treated in makeshift triageunits. The Ayacucho Regional Health Directorate reported that 8 were killed and 52 were injured.

Former president Castillo is sentenced to 18 months of pretrial detention. While imprisoned, Castillo states that the United States is responsible for the violence in Peru, stating "The visit of the US ambassador to the Government Palace was not free, nor was it in favor of the country. It was to give the order to take the troops to the streets and massacre my defenseless people; and, by the way, leave the way free for mining operations, ... The Peruvian press will not only keep quiet about this, but will deny it so easily."

=== 16 December ===
About 10,000 people marched in Chincheros, blocking a bridge between Ayacucho and Chincheros. Congress rejected the proposal of advancing the 2026 elections to an earlier date; 49 were in favor, 33 against and 25 abstained, with 87 required for the proposal to pass. Education Minister Patricia Correa and Culture Minister Jair Perez both resigned over the loss of life caused by the protests.

=== 17 December ===
A confrontation occurred on the Ocoña bridge, blocked by 500 protesters, leaving six injured, two of whom were soldiers and four civilians.

General secretary of the Arequipa Departmental Federation of Workers (ADFW), José Luis Chapa, rejected the regional curfews and described Dina Boluarte as a fascist for her actions. He also denied that any members of the ADFW were involved in criminal acts or vandalism.

50 agents of the National Police entered the premises of the New Peru party and the Peasant Confederation of Peru. Slingshots, machetes and ski masks were reportedly found and 26 people were detained. During the night there was a confrontation between protestors and the police on the highway in the Huipoca district (Ucayali) leaving 11 injured (6 police officers and 5 civilians).

=== 18 December ===
In Chala, a road was temporarily reopened by protesters after dozens of trucks were prevented from passing on the road for over a week.

=== 19 December ===
In Arequipa, vehicular traffic began to improve. Hundreds of tourists visiting Machu Picchu were rescued after exit paths were blocked by protesters.

=== 20 December ===
The Congress of Peru provides its first approval for a constitutional change to allow for presidential elections in April 2024, with a final approval required later in 2023. The Boluarte government declared the Mexican Ambassador to Peru persona non grata due to Mexico's support for former president Castillo. Representatives from the Inter-American Human Rights Commission (IACHR) begin their visit in Peru. In Ayacucho, authorities threatened merchants to not participate in planned protests.

=== 21 December ===
President Boluarte shuffles her first cabinet, placing her former Minister of Defense Alberto Otárola as the new prime minister, while also replacing the Minister of Interior and Minister of Defense. Boluarte's new Minister of Education, Óscar Becerra, was reported to have a history of being an Fujimorist. Transporters in Puno begin an indefinite strike, with hundreds marching through the street chanting "This democracy is no longer a democracy" after learning that Boluarte would remain in office until 2024. In Andahuaylas, protesters filled the streets denouncing the Boluarte government and demanding the dissolution of Congress. In Cusco, some provincial leaders agree to suspend protests until 3 January 2023, using the time to organize larger protests.

=== 22 December ===
Sporadic protests continue in rural regions, though many roads are reopened throughout the nation. Protesters continued activities in the regions of Amazonía, Apurímac, Arequipa, Ayacucho, Cusco, La Libertad, Lambayeque, Piura and Puno. In Amazonía, indigenous leaders release a statement stating "We alert the Army, we alert the National Police of Peru not to upset us because we are in our territory, we will see each other there, there we will surely declare war, because they are already provoking us and creating us discomfort". IACHR representatives meet with Castillo in prison and confirm that conditions complied with standards, with the group leaving Peru later that day.

=== 23 December ===
Congressman Guido Bellido proposed a bill that would provide monetary compensation for "injured people and the legal heirs of the deceased as a result of police and military repression". Rodríguez Ballón International Airport reports that flights after dusk would not occur for at least three months due to the destruction of navigational equipment at the airport.

=== 24 December ===
Prime Minister Otárola stated that the Boluarte government was seeking to make Congress bicameral again. Minister of Justice and Human Rights of Peru, José Tello, announced that reparations would be organized by a commission and distributed to individuals who were killed during the protests.

=== 25 December ===
Peruvian army troops and national police raided the Kepashiato natural gas plant in the La Convención Province, removing at least 140 protesters who had seized the plant. With rumors of violence occurring at the plant, the armed forces told citizens "not to give credit to malicious versions that aim to incite violence in the area and reiterate their commitment to continue working in compliance with the rules that regulate the use of force and with unrestricted respect for human rights".

=== 26 December ===
Together for Peru congresswoman Sigrid Bazán presents a bill calling for a referendum asking if citizens would want to form a constituent assembly. The referendum presented in the bill would only serve as a consultation, seeking the opinion of voters on creating a constituent assembly. In La Libertad, some 500 to 1,000 rondas campesinas began plans to create blockades in the area to demand new elections, with some already participating in strikes.

=== 27 December ===
In the Ilave District of El Collao Province, protesters demanding immediate elections instead of elections in 2024 continued to block the Puno-Desaguadero Highway, preventing traffic from traveling between Peru and the plateau region of Bolivia. The ombudsman office of Peru also released a statement that continued protests would occur nationwide into the new year, saying that protests were temporarily halted due to the holidays. An agreement between provincial leaders in Puno was made to continue widespread blockades on 4 January and to begin a march to Lima to demand the resignation of President Boluarte. General Secretary of Popular Force Luis Galarreta announced that Keiko Fujimoriis preparing to be a candidate in the next presidential election.

=== 29 December ===
The appeals court of the Supreme Court of Peru denied the appeal of former president Castillo, ruling that he should continue to be held in pretrial detention for at least 18 months.

=== 30 December ===
The National Chamber of Tourism (Canatur) reported that due to protests, Peru had lost an estimated 1.7 billion soles($450 million USD) of tourism income since the start of the demonstrations.

=== 31 December ===
The Peruvian National Police called for citizens to participate in a "Great March for Peace" on 3 January 2023 in the town squares of cities throughout Peru.

== 2023 ==
=== 2 January ===
At Plaza Manco Cápac, where protesters from several regions had gathered in tents to protest in Lima, at least 100 police violently evicted individuals from the area without notice. Police in the plaza were seen destroying the property of those gathered, including the destruction of a food donation tent. Authorities were seen shoving and grabbing some individuals by the neck while performing arrests.

=== 3 January ===
Over 2,000 tourists are evacuated from Machu Picchu after access to the site was blocked by protesters. Train service to Machu Picchu would be suspended indefinitely the next day.

=== 4 January ===
After two weeks of pausing protests for the holiday season, blockages in Apurimac, Arequipa, Cusco, Junin and Puno continued. Thousands of protesters march in Lima demanding the resignation of President Boluarte, the closure of Congress and new elections. As protesters approached the Legislative Palace, police fired tear gas at demonstrators, dispersing them. No clashes between protesters and authorities were reported.

=== 5 January ===
President Boluarte gave a speech calling for dialogue and praising authorities, saying "The right to peaceful protest ends when other rights are violated", condemning roadblocks occurring nationwide.

=== 7 January ===
In Juliaca, Puno, authorities shot a photojournalist of EFE in the leg, destroyed a motor taxi, and attacked an adolescent and their mother.

=== 8 January ===
In 5 regions, at least 46 areas on 9 highways experienced continued blockages by protesters according to the government.

=== 9 January ===
Protesters from multiple districts of Puno joined demonstrations in Juliaca. Protesters approached Inca Manco Cápac International Airport around noon and demonstrated nearby, though when some began to enter the airport at 5:20pm, authorities responded to the demonstration with deadly force. In total, 18 civilians were killed and over 100 others were injured. Journalists covering the massacre were sought to be identified by police intelligence units. Likewise, the murder of a policeman set on fire and the burning of Jorge Luis Flores Ancachi was reported, in addition to various looting of different business centers by the protesters.

=== 10 January ===
Attorney General of Peru Patricia Benavides announces investigations for the alleged crimes of genocide, aggravated homicide and serious injuries against President Dina Boluarte, Prime Minister Alberto Otárola, Minister of the Interior Víctor Rojas and Minister of Defense Jorge Chávez.

=== 11 January ===
At the Alejandro Velasco Astete International Airport in Cusco, clashes occurred when protesters attempted to enter the airport. The first death in Cusco is registered when a peasant leader is shot by authorities. A shopping mall in Tacna was stormed by protesters who attempted to loot the center, though national police dispersed crowds with tear gas. In the Department of San Martín, the Fernando Belaúnde Terry Highway was blocked by protesters.

=== 13 January ===
A "March for Peace" occurred in Cusco, with individuals opposed to the protest movement organizing the event to demand peace. While individuals were being detained and placed in the back of the truck of authorities, "March for Peace" marchers were seen beating detainees and attacking a journalist who asked for the names of detainees.

=== 14 January ===
A state of emergency was declared in Apurímac, Callao, Cusco, Lima, Madre de Dios, Moquegua and Puno, with some roads also being declared under the emergency. At least 121 blockades occurred nationwide and 19 highways were affected in 11 regions.

=== 15 January ===
It is reported that sales at some stores in Lima have decreased by 60% during the protests. Sales in Cusco resume following days of protest. A caravan of protesters is seen heading for Lima from southern regions.

=== 16 January ===
The North Panamerican Highway is blocked by protesters. The Coordinadora Nacional de Derechos Humanos calls on President Boluarte to resign in order to appease protesters. Ronderos in Huamachuco block the entrance and exit of vehicles in the town. In the Humay District, PNP officers block and arrest a caravan of individuals heading north to protest in Lima.

=== 17 January ===
The North Panamerican Highway is cleared of blockades by PNP officers, with some clashes reported in Virú. Preparations for the Toma de Lima begin as protesters arrive from southern Peru. CGTP, Peru's largest union, called for a national strike on 19 January. Clashes occur in Plaza San Martín, with PNP officers dispersing protests with tear gas. Students of the National University of San Marcos assist protesters traveling from other regions by allowing them to stay in their dormitories, with about 300 protesters from other regions seeking accommodations.

=== 18 January ===
Regional protest leaders gathered in Lima demanded an international press conference to share their concerns and to call for the resignation of the government. The rector of the National University of San Marcos evicts protesters staying at dormitories, demanding the PNP to remove individuals. The rector of the National University of Engineering granted protesters access to dormitories, stating "welcome to your home and take care of her".

Two people died during blockades near Virú on the North Panamerican Highway; a 28-week-old premature baby and a woman who had a heart attack on a bus. In Macusani, Puno, a protester is killed during clashes with authorities.

=== 19 January ===
Tens of thousands of citizens from throughout Peru protested in Lima during the Toma de Lima demonstrations. The Boluarte government prepared for the protests by deploying 11,800 officers of the PNP, with some Pegaso BMR armoured personnel carriers observed throughout Lima. Clashes begin near Parque Universitario, with PNP officers seen removing journalists from the seen and firing rubber pellets and tear gas at protesters. At Plaza San Martin, a nearby building erupts into flames, growing into a three-alarm-fire.

=== 21 January ===
The PNP raided the National University of San Marcos after protesters had stayed at the dormitories for more than three days; the rector granted only one day of lodging. The PNP were seen ramming the gates of the university with an armored personnel carrier and arresting more than 200 protesters who were staying in the dormitories. Police are seen preventing lawyers and Public Ministry staff from entering the university grounds while individuals were being detained. A journalist for Latina TV was arrested by police while covering the incident. The Inter-American Commission on Human Rights condemned the PNP's actions, saying they were "incompatible with the principles of international law".

Over 50 people had been injured nationwide in the demonstrations, according to a report from Peru's ombudsman.

=== 22 January ===
Machu Picchu was indefinitely shut down because of disrupted transportation which left hundreds of tourists stranded.

=== 23 January ===
Peru issued a formal complaint against the governments of Bolivia and Colombia for "interference in issues which are only responsibility of the Peruvian people". In regards to Bolivia, the government of Peru condemned Bolivian president Luis Arce's support for the protesters.

=== 24 January ===
Students from universities throughout Peru participate in protests against the PNP raid at the National University of San Marcos. Some journalists are hit with pellets fired by PNP officers in Lima. While speaking to foreign press, President Boluarte stated "Puno is not Peru", though her staff would later apologize stating that the statement "was not an expression of discrimination or arrogance".

=== 25 January ===
Minister of Production, Sandra Belaunde Arnillas, resigns from the Boluarte government amidst protests. Prime Minister Otárola announces a special bonus for officers of the Peruvian National Police who responded to protests. In Cusco, fuel shortages were reported due to road blocks. Hundreds protested outside of the United States embassy in Lima.

=== 26 January ===
A statement by the Ministries of Defense and the Interior warns protesters that they should remove roadblocks or else authorities would resort to acting in the "defense of legality". During protests in Lima, a police officer is seen getting off a motorcycle and firing a shotgun at protesters at point-blank range, with the officer then fleeing the scene with his partner.

=== 28 January ===
External videos
- A video showing police shooting a protester in the head, medical volunteers providing aid and the testimony of one of the responders on YouTube

Congress votes to deny the advancement of elections to October 2023 – 65 legislators voted against, 45 voted in favor and 2 abstained – inflaming anger amongst protesters. Thousands of protesters gathered in the Historic Centre of Lima, resulting in PNP officers clashing with protesters in the area. The first death in Lima occurs when a 55-year-old protester was shot in the head with a tear gas canister by police during protests in the Historic Centre of Lima. The government would attempt to deny that police killed the protester. Demonstrators accompanying the injured at the nearby Grau Hospital are attacked by police outside of the facility. Reports emerge of injured protesters being arbitrarily detained by police. A reporter for Wayka is attacked by a PNP officer who hit the press worker and took their equipment.

=== 30 January ===
The Peruvian Army is deployed in Pisco, clearing the South Pan-American Highway of blockades near Barrio Chino. In Cusco, large shortages of natural gas are reported.

=== 31 January ===
Protesters gather outside of Jorge Chávez International Airport, Peru's primary international airport, with the Peruvian Army being deployed to prevent further demonstrations. Demonstrations occur outside of the Legislative Palace in Lima. Moody's Investors Service changes Peru's credit rating outlook to "Negative", citing "a deterioration in institutional cohesion, governability, policy effectiveness and economic strength through successive governments".

=== 1 February ===
At least 14 national highways remained blocked in 81 locations due to roadblocks of protesters.

=== 3 February ===
Members of the far-right group La Resistencia attacked peaceful protesters near Parque Kennedy in the Miraflores District, with members threatening demonstrators with bats and chanting "Terrorism never again!" In Cusco, a citywide strike sees nearly 90% in participating, with 100% of transportation participating.

=== 4 February ===
Cities in the Peruvian Amazon report shortages of natural gas and fruit, which was being consumed due to the inability to cook, as a result of road blockades used by protesters.

=== 2 March ===
During a "Second Takeover of Lima" event, protest leaders announced that 13 provinces would participate in mobilizations throughout the nation and that protesters would continue to congregate in Lima. Clashes occur between protesters and authorities at San Martín Square, with police dispersing demonstrators with tear gas. A female journalist of La Republica was assaulted with a baton by a police officer while covering the protests.

=== 4 March ===
Soldiers open fire at protesters in Juli, injuring five and leaving one wounded with a bullet wound.

=== 5 March ===
Troops marching from Ilave to Juli to respond to protests are confronted by an Aymara group who wanted to prevent further violence from soldiers in the town, resulting with the troops attempting to march back to Ilave. As the soldiers left the area, they fired their weapons into the air, forcing hundreds of protesters to fall to the ground to avoid stray bullets. Captain Josué Frisancho Lazo then ordered his troops to enter the Ilave River to save time returning to the Pachacútec barracks; the soldiers who were locals from the area were hesitant, though obeyed orders nonetheless. Six soldiers subsequently became trapped in the river's current and drowned. Community members who were protesting would then enter the river to rescue soldiers that were struggling in the water. The Ministry of Defense would later blame the deaths on protesters, describing them as "violentists", though the soldiers were far from the opposing groups.

=== 9 March ===
The Council of Ministers lift the state of emergency order for Lima, with Prime Minister Alberto Otárola stating "the conditions and considerations that led us to declare a state of emergency to this important area of the country have passed".

=== 5 April ===
The Congress of Peru voted against impeaching Dina Boluarte over the deaths of dozens of protesters during the ongoing protests.

=== 1 May ===
Thousands march through Lima for four hours demanding the resignation of Boluarte and new elections, though these demonstrations were not covered by Peruvian media.

=== 3 May ===
In a report released on May 3rd, the Inter-American Commission on Human Rights (IACHR) stated that the Peruvian state's response to nationwide protests could be classified as a "massacre". The president of the commission, Margarette May Macauly, said in the report that "There were serious human rights violations that must be investigated with due diligence and an ethnic-racial approach," and that "The deaths could constitute extrajudicial executions."

=== 17 May ===
The Supreme Court of Peru rules that the right to protest was not protected by the Constitution of Peru. Following the court's verdict, additional protests were called for July 2023.

=== 9 July ===
The Peruvian National Police announced that they were documenting the identities of individuals entering Lima in preparation for the third Toma de Lima, scheduled for 19 July.

=== 12 July ===
The Boluarte government declares a 30-day state of emergency along the highways in Peru due to the risk of protest blockades and to protect mining transport corridors.

=== 18 July ===
President Boluarte during a speech would say that the upcoming Toma de Lima protests were a "threat to democracy" and said that demonstrators were "waving their war flags".

=== 19 July ===
The third Toma de Lima demonstrations occur, with thousands participating in protests occurring throughout Peru. In preparation, 24,000 police were deployed nationwide, with authorities removing their name badges so that they could not be identified. Several thousand people were seen protesting in Lima, with the Interior Ministry reporting that 21,000 people protested in the capital city. Clashes occurred on Abancay Avenue, with some police seen firing shotguns at protesters despite the government making statements that weapons would not be used against demonstrations. One female journalist was hit by five shotgun pellets to the face and arm while covering the protests in Lima.

=== 28 July ===
During Fiestas Patrias, marches were held in Lima, with police seen dispersing demonstrations with tear gas and firing weapons directly at protesters.
