= Wilamaya Patjxa =

Archaeological site in Peru

- Ilave 13014
- Location in Peru
- 16°12′S 69°42′W
- Type: open-air seasonal residential site
- Periods: Early to Middle Archaic periods
- Cultures: Ancestral Aymara
- Associated with: foragers (a.k.a., hunter–gatherers)
- Location: Mulla Fasiri, Puno, Peru
- Region: Ilave Basin, Lake Titicaca Basin, Andean Altiplano

History
- Built: 9,000 BP.

Site notes
- Elevation: 3,925 m (12,877 ft)
- Area: 1.6 ha (4.0 acres)

Wilamaya Patjxa is an ancestral Aymara archaeological site located on the Andean Altiplano in the Lake Titicaca Basin, Puno, Peru. Mobile forager populations occupied the high-altitude (3,925 m) site approximately 9,000 years ago. The site represents the earliest directly dated evidence of human occupation of the Titicaca Basin and thus offers insights into the behaviors and practices of some of the earliest humans to live in the cold, hypoxic high-altitude environment.

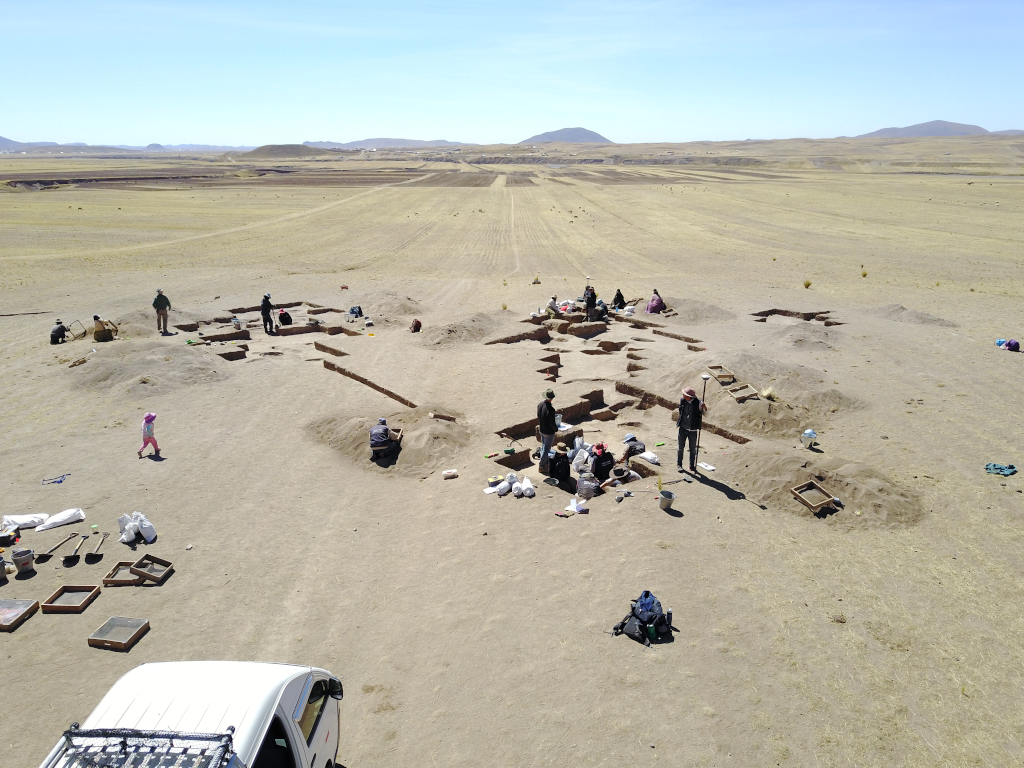
2019 Excavations at Wilamaya Patjxa, Puno, Peru

The site is located on a small hill and covers approximately 1.6 ha. Artifacts include abundant lithic materials, groundstone, large-mammal bone, and red ocher. Notably absent are ceramics and permanent architecture, indicating that the inhabitants were residentially mobile. Archaeological excavations in 2018 revealed a series of cultural pit features including human burial pits containing six individuals. Radiocarbon dates on two individuals establish occupation sometime between 9,000 and 8,700 BP

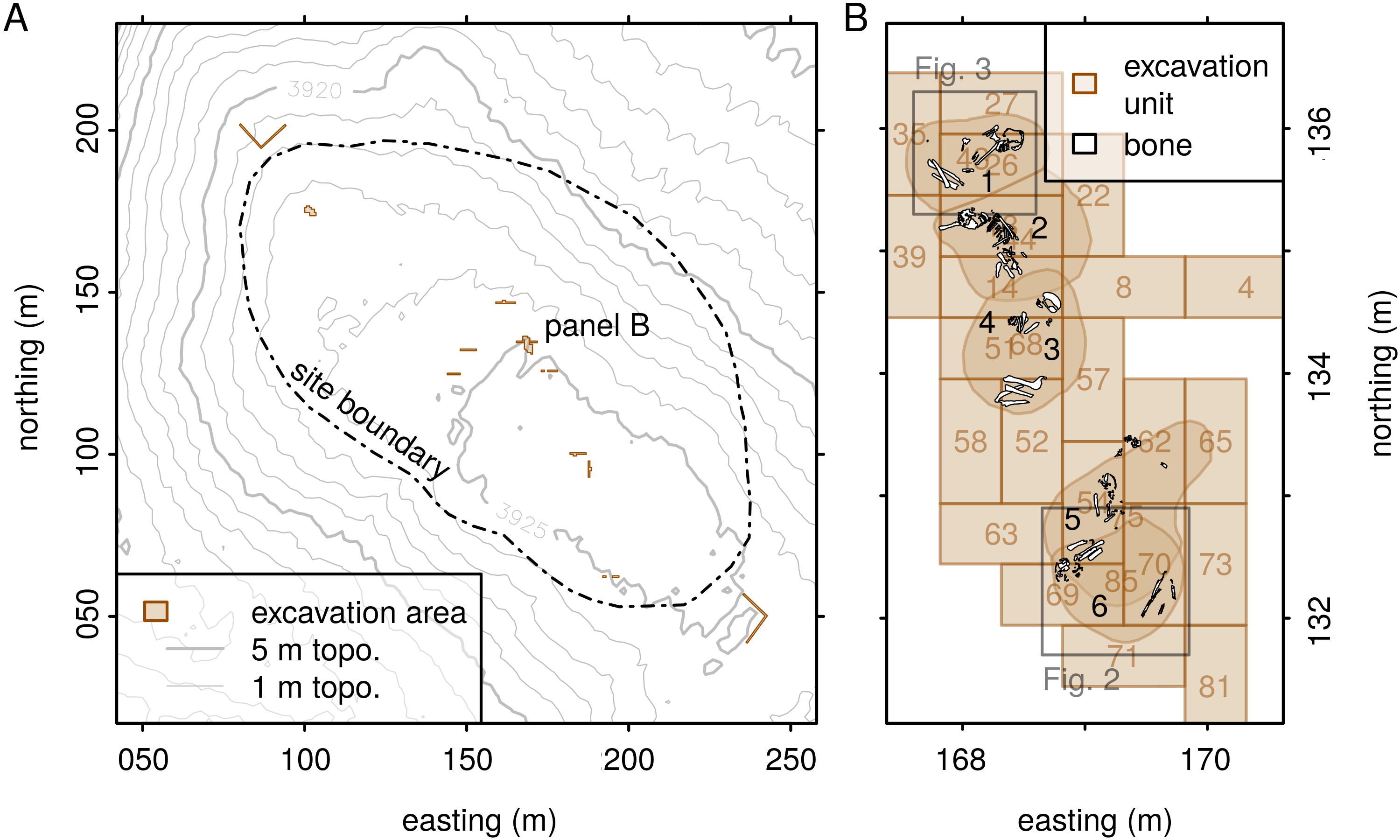
Wilamaya Patjxa Map

The most prominent discoveries at Wilamaya Patjxa are a female burial (WMP 6) and a male burial (WMP 1), each interred with large-mammal hunting tools. Aymara community members have since named these individuals, Warawara and Phaxsi, respectively. The findings suggest that both the female and male individuals were large-mammal hunters and contribute to a series of empirical challenges to the Man the Hunter hypothesis, which envisions pronounced sexual division of labor among ancestral human populations as suggested by such divisions among recent forager populations. On December 2, 2021, the Peruvian Ministry of Culture declared Warawara's and Phaxsi's tools Cultural Patrimony of the Nation.

== Warawara ==
Warawara was a young-adult female ceremoniously interred with a hunting toolkit 9,000 years ago at the site of Wilamaya Patjxa. Warawara is the name Aymara community members gave to the individual identified initially as burial Individual 6 (WMP 6). Warawara means "star" in Aymara language.

Two radiocarbon dates on bone collagen establish that the burial occurred sometime between 9,000 and 8,700 years ago. Proteomic and osteological analyses shows that the individual was female and approximately 17–19 years old at the time of death.

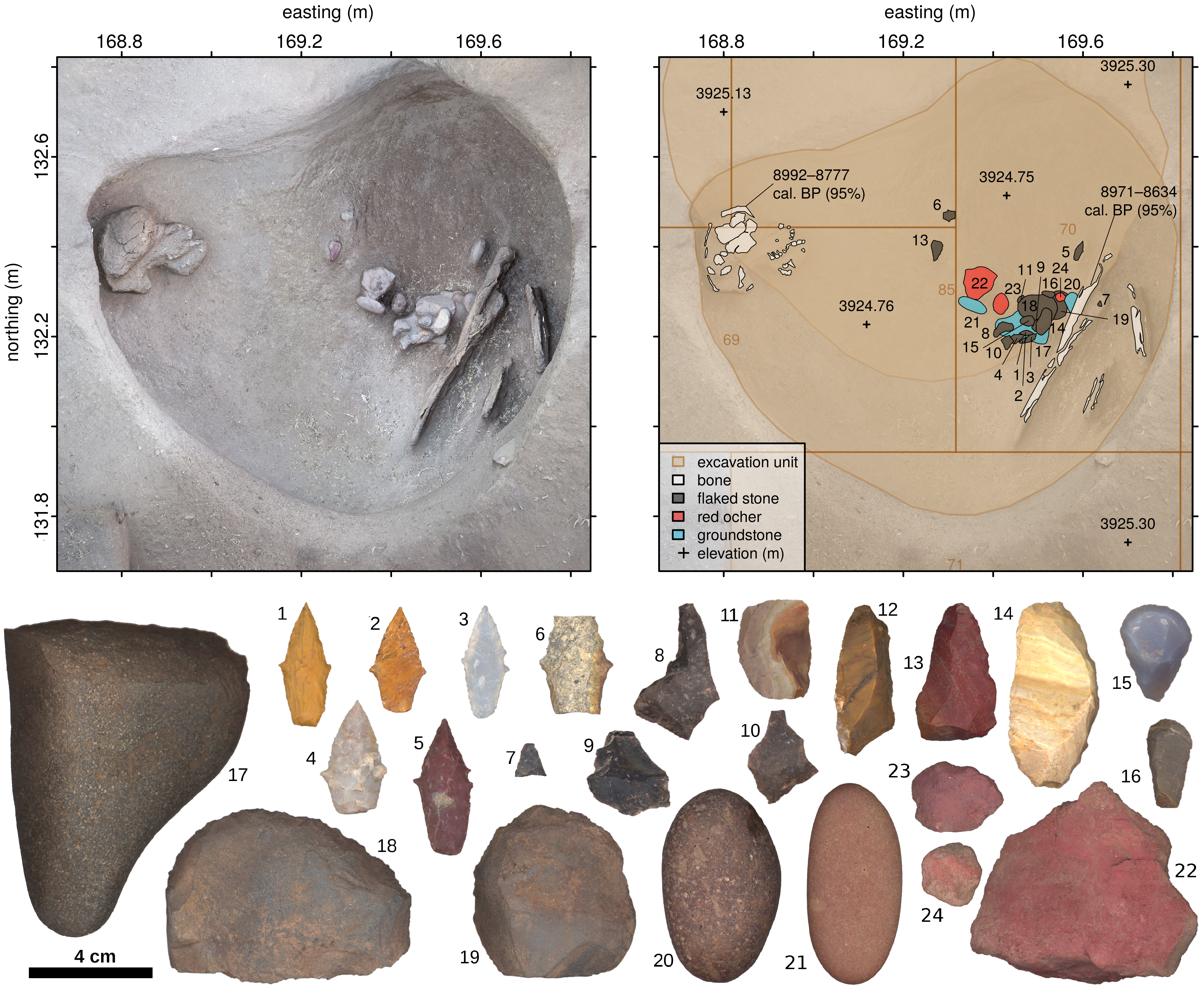
Warawara, Wilamaya Patjxa burial Individual 6 (WMP6). Warawara was a young adult female interred with a large-mammal hunting toolkit 9000 years ago at the archaeological site of Wilamaya Patjxa

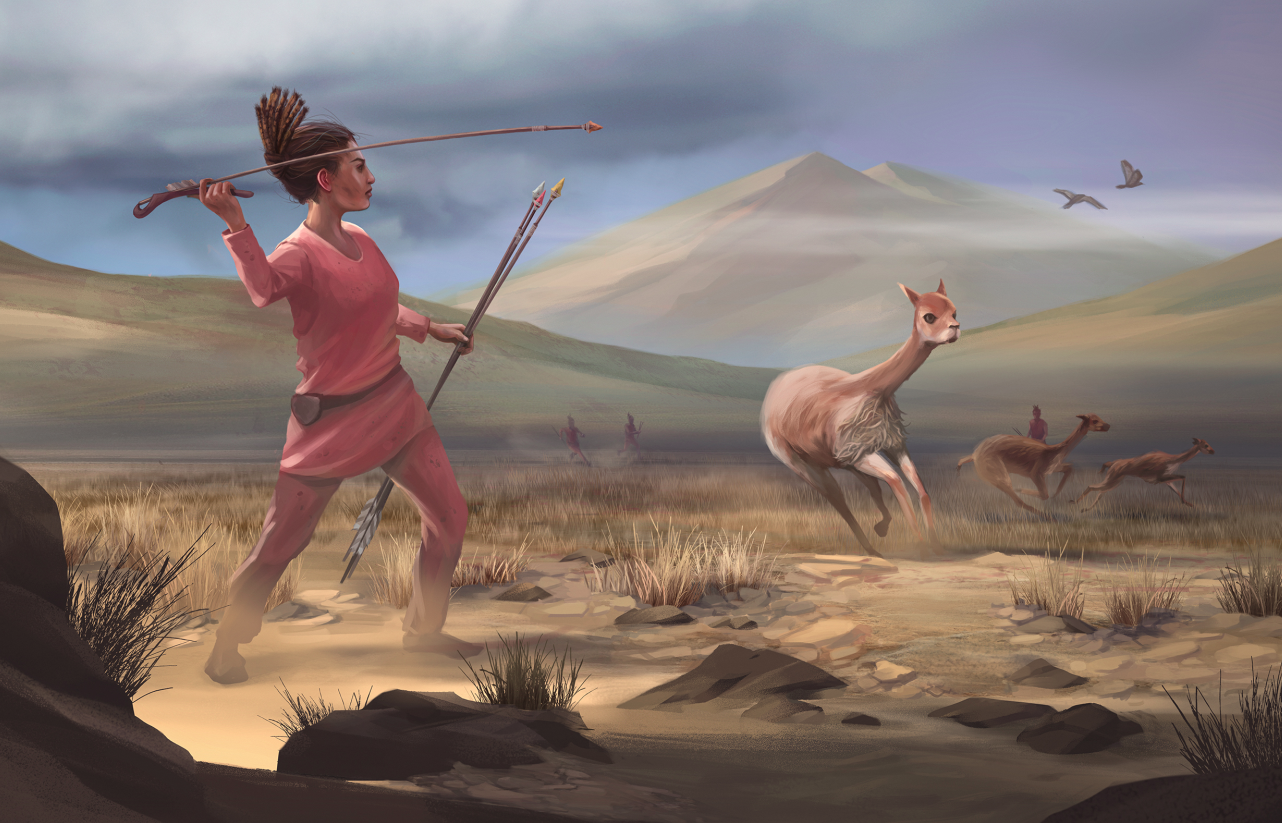
An artistic reconstruction of Warawara hunting vicuña. The reconstruction is based on archaeological findings, rock art, and other archaeological evidence from the region. Artwork by Matthew Verdolivo in consultation with Randy Haas.

The burial assemblage is by far the richest of the burials excavated at Wilamaya Patjxa and the nearby site of Soro Mik'aya Patjxa. The toolkit likely represents a large-mammal hunting toolkit. Five complete projectile points were likely used to dispatch large mammals including vicuña and taruca as indicated by the site's faunal assemblage. Microscopic examination of the projectile points confirm that they were indeed used as projectile points and not solely as knives or grave goods. The other tools in the kit include stone hide scrapers, flakes, a knife, choppers, cobbles, and red ocher, all of which were likely used for animal processing. The association of large-mammal hunting tools with a female individual suggests that the individual was likely a hunter. This conclusion follows from a previous cross-cultural study, which found that the tools people used in life tend to be those that accompany them to the grave.

Stable oxygen isotope readings from the bone indicate that Warawara was a permanent resident of the highlands. Stable carbon and nitrogen isotope readings combined with archaeobotanical and zooarchaeological data show that their diet was largely plant based with meat comprising approximately 20% of the diet.

== Phaxsi ==
Phaxsi was an adult male ceremoniously interred 9,000 years ago at the site of Wilamaya Patjxa. Phaxsi is the name Aymara community members gave to the individual initially identified as burial Individual 1 (WMP 1). The name means "moon" in Aymara language.

A radiocarbon date on bone collagen establishes that the burial occurred sometime between 9,000 and 8,700 years ago and thus was roughly contemporaneous with Warawara. Proteomic and osteological analyses shows that Phaxsi was male and approximately 25–30 years old at the time of death.

The individual was associated with two projectile points, though it is unclear if the artifacts were funerary objects or homicide weapons. Microscopic examination of the projectile points confirm that both artifacts were used as projectile points and that one was also used as a knife.

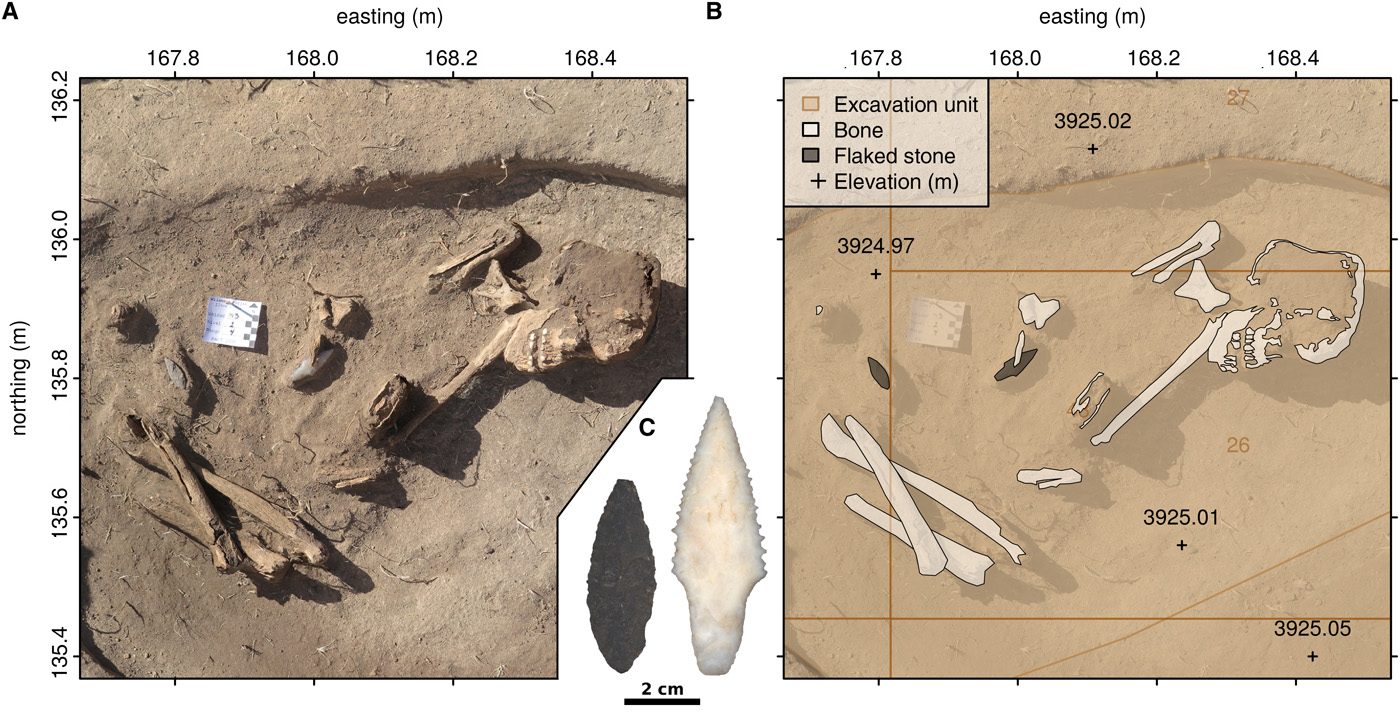
Phaxsi, Wilamaya Patjxa burial Individual 1 (WMP1). Phaxsi was an adult male individual buried 9,000 years ago at the archaeological site of Wilamaya Patjxa. The individual was associated with two lithic projectile points.

Stable oxygen isotope readings from the bone indicate that Phaxsi was a permanent resident of the highlands. Stable carbon and nitrogen isotope readings combined with archaeobotanical and zooarchaeological data show that their diet was largely plant based with meat comprising approximately 20% of the diet.

== Dietary reconstruction ==
Stable isotope bone chemistry, archaeobotanical, and zooarchaeological analyses were used to reconstruct the diets of individuals at Wilamaya Patjxa and Soro Mik'aya Patjxa. The stable isotope chemistry of seven adult individuals from Wilamaya Patjxa reveals that the average diet consisted of approximately 80% plant matter and 20% meat. Burnt plant remains recovered by flotation indicate that tubers–likely wild potatoes–comprised the major plant food. Animal bone recovered from the site is principally camelid bone (e.g., vicuña) with lesser amounts of deer (e.g., taruca). Fish, birds, and small mammals are notably absent from the faunal assemblage. The sum of the data indicate that plant foods were the dietary staple with large mammals playing a secondary role in the Wilamaya Patjxa subsistence economy approximately 9,000 years ago in the Andean highlands.

== History of investigation ==
During the 2013 excavations of Soro Mik'aya Patjxa, Albino Pilco Quispe (Aymara community of Mulla Fasiri and long-time archaeology collaborator) informed archaeologist, Randy Haas (University of Wyoming) of an artifact concentration on his agricultural land in Mulla Fasiri. Inspection of the artifacts revealed that the site had an Early Archaic Period (11.7--9.0 ka) component and thus potential to reveal insights into the earliest human populations of the Titicaca Basin. With support from the University of California, Davis, archaeologists and members of the community of Mulla Fasiri conducted excavations in 2018 and 2019. The site derives its name from the Aymara name of the land on which it occurs.

== Media coverage ==
The findings at Wilamaya Patjxa received widespread media coverage from hundreds of news outlets including the New York Times, El País, National Geographic, and National Public Radio. National Geographic wrote that "Prehistoric female hunter discovery upends gender role assumptions". Forbes concluded, "Don’t Blame Gender Inequity On Our Ancestors, Ancient Women Were Big-Game Hunters Too". The New York Times reported that "Ancient Remains in Peru Reveal Young, Female Big-Game Hunter" but "Scientists are divided on broader implications of the find for ancient gender roles". UC Davis Unfold podcast declared, "she was a badass."

== Illustrated short story: The Hunters of Puno ==
In 2025, with support from the States Embassy in Peru Ambassador's Fund for Cultural Preservation, members of the Aymara community of Mulla Fasiri, Peruvian archaeologists, and U.S. archaeologists collaborated to produce a short, illustrated historical fiction book about Wilamaya Patjxa based on archaeology, ethnography, and traditional Aymara knowledge.

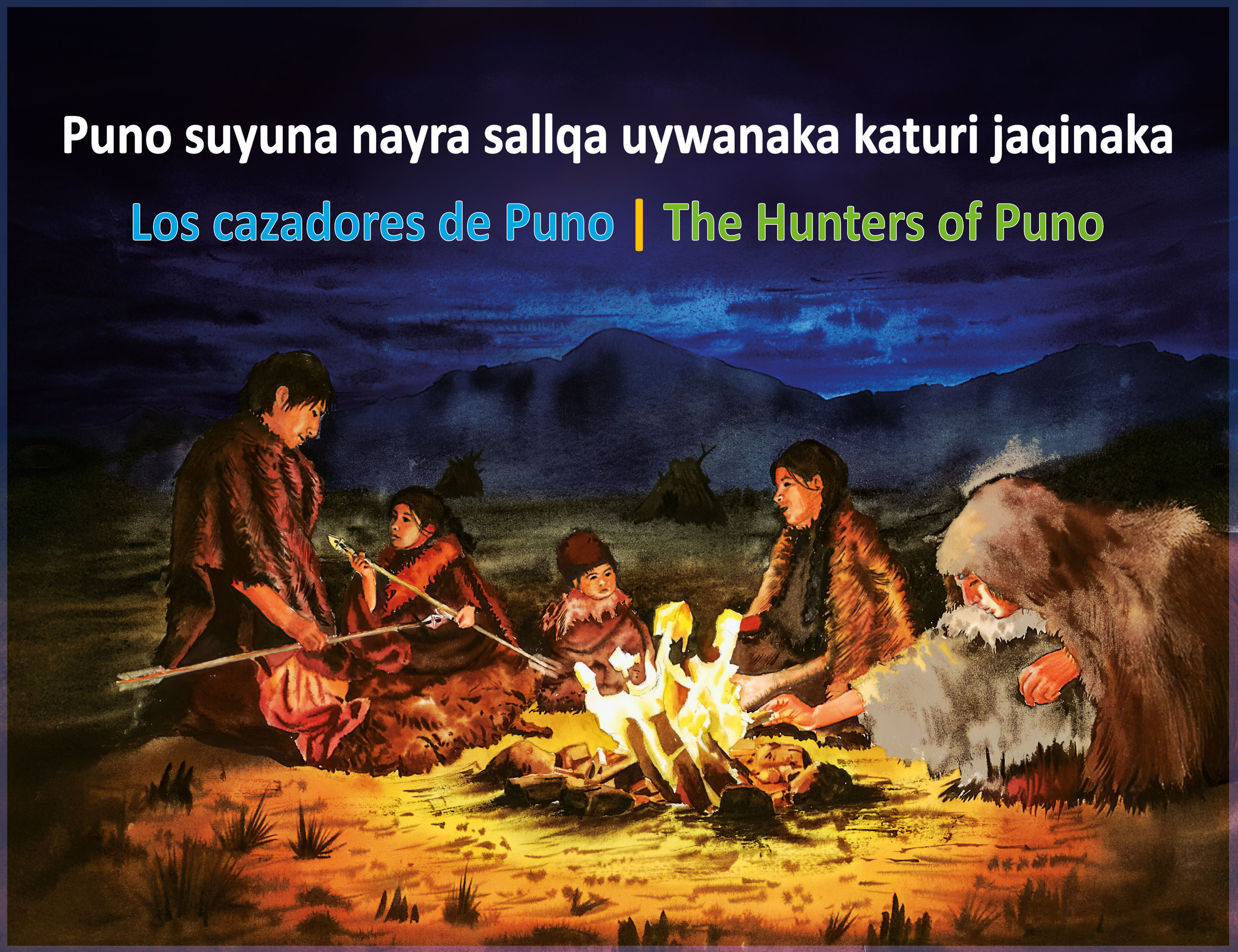
Cover of The Hunters of Puno. Illustration by Sandro Edwin Alania Pari

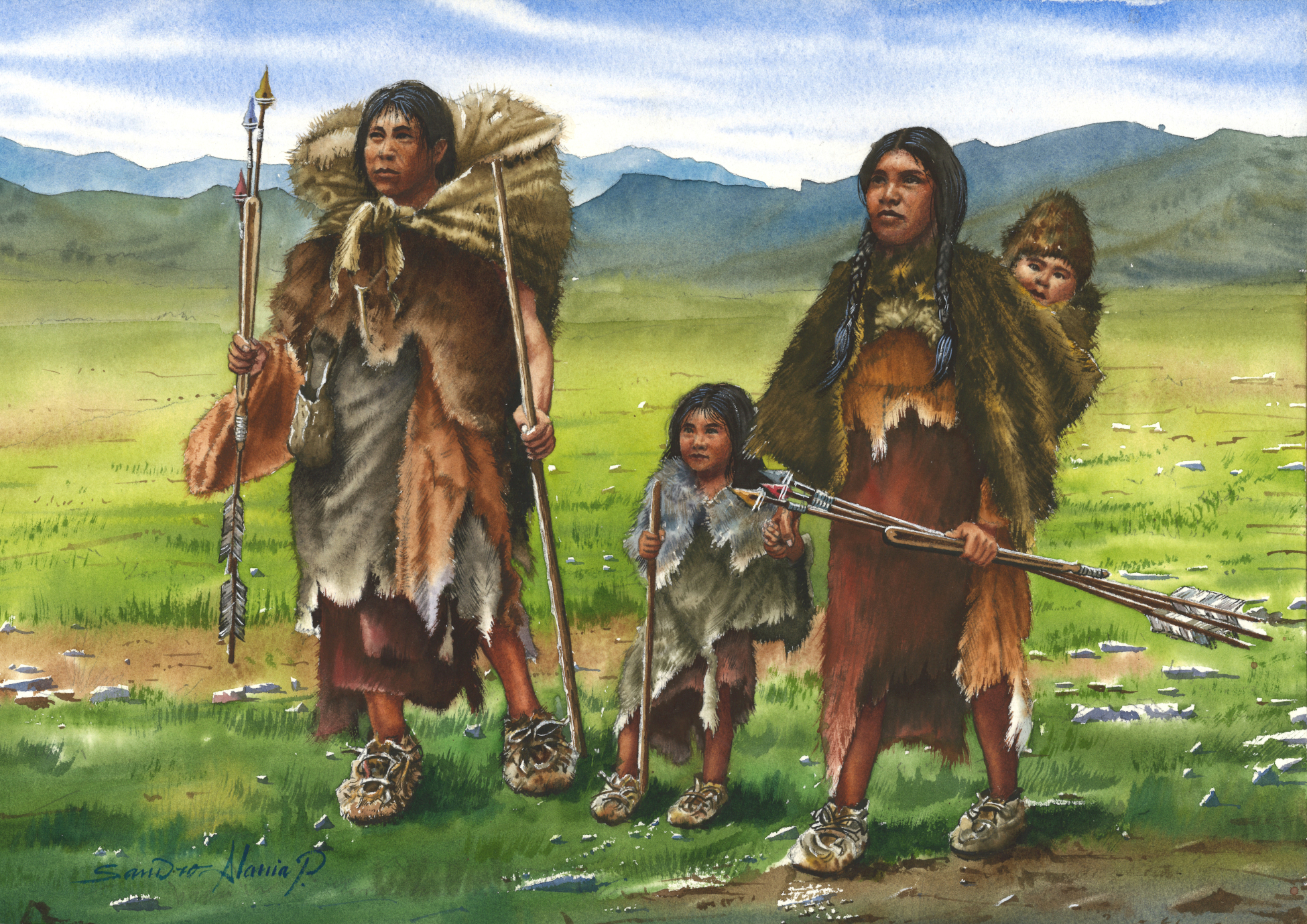
Warawara, Phaxsi, Wiskachita, and Panqarita as illustrated by Sandro Edwin Alania Pari in the book, The Hunters of Puno.

The story describes a nomadic forager family and their small community that lived at Wilamaya Patjxa 9000 years ago. The community had not successfully hunted vicuña for several months and desperately needed animal hides for clothing in the cold mountain environment. One fateful day, a young couple, Warawara and Phaxsi, ascended Fasiri mountain and successfully hunted two adult vicuña with their atlatls. However, they unwittingly orphaned a cría (baby vicuña). When they returned to camp, their young daughter, Wiskachita, pleaded to spare the crías life, but the community depended on its meat and hide. However, in the night, Warawara and Phaxsi sheared the cría and wove a wool hat, which they offered the next day to a baby in need. They convinced the community to care for the cría so that they could continue to benefit from its wool. In that moment, the vicuña became a community member and the first in a herd that would grow to supply the community with wool for life in the high Andes.

The book is presented in three languages—Aymara, Spanish, and English—with Aymara translation by Dilma Velásquez Llano (Puno) and illustrated by Sandro Edwin Alania Pari (Ilave). The design was by Valdez Ediciones E.I.R.L. (Lima). University of Wyoming WyoScholar hosts freely available digital copies (pdf) . Print copies are available in the U.S. and U.K. from IngramSpark and in South America from Avqi Ediciones at and .

== See also ==
- Jiskairumoko
- Qillqatani
- Soro Mik'aya Patjxa

== Notes ==
=== References ===
- Aldenderfer, Mark S. (2006) "Modelling plateau peoples: the early human use of the world's high plateaux." World Archaeology 38(3):357–370. doi:10.1080/00438240600813285
- "Altmetric: Female hunter's of the early Americas". Retrieved 31 October 2023.
- Anderson, Abigail; Chilczuk, Sophia; Nelson, Kaylie; Ruther, Roxanne; Wall-Scheffler, Cara (2023) "The myth of man the hunter: women's contribution to the hunt across ethnographic contexts." PLoS ONE 18(6):e0287101. doi:10.1371/journal.pone.0287101.
- Ángel Criado, Miguel (2020) "Las mujeres prehistóricas también cazaban grandes animales." El País. Retrieved 31 October 2023.
- Binford, Lewis R. (1971) "Mortuary practices: their study and their potential". Memoirs of the Society for American Archaeology 25:6--29. doi:10.1017/s0081130000002525.
- Chen, Jennifer C.; Aldenderfer, Mark S.; Eerkens, Jelmer W.; Langlie, BrieAnna S.; Viviano Llave, Carlos; Watson, James T.; Haas, Randall (2024) "Stable isotope chemistry reveals plant-dominant diet among early foragers on the Andean Altiplano, 9.0–6.5 cal. ka." PLoS ONE 19(1): e0296420. doi:10.1371/journal.pone.0296420.
- Elsesser, Kim (2020) "Don’t Blame Gender Inequity On Our Ancestors, Ancient Women Were Big-Game Hunters Too." Forbes. Retrieved 31 October 2023.
- Gorman, James (2020) "Ancient Remains in Peru Reveal Young, Female Big-Game Hunter." Trilobites, New York Times. Retrieved 31 October 2023.
- Haas, Randall (2023) "Early settlement of the High Andes." Oxford Research Encyclopedia. doi:10.1093/acrefore/9780190854584.013.444
- Haas, Randall; Watson, James; Buonasera, Tammy; Southon, John; Chen, Jennifer C.; Noe, Sarah; Smith, Kevin; Viviano Llave, Carlos; Eerkens, Jelmer; Parker, Glendon. "Female hunters of the early Americas". Science Advances. American Association for the Advancement of Science (AAAS). 6 (45): eabd0310. doi:10.1126/sciadv.abd0310.
- Kelly, Robert L. (2013) The lifeways of hunter-gatherers: the foraging spectrum. Cambridge University Press.
- Lacy, Sarah; Ocobock, Cara (2023) "Woman the hunter: The archaeological evidence." American Anthropologist. doi:10.1111/aman.13914.
- Lim, Alexa (2020) "Ancient Big Game Hunters May Have Included Women." Science Friday, National Public Radio. Retrieved 31 October 2023.
- Lindo, John; Haas, Randall; Hofman, Courtney; Apata, Mario; Moraga, Mauricio; Verdugo, Ricardo A.; Watson, James T.; Viviano Llave, Carlos; Witonsky, David; Beall, Cynthia; Warinner, Christina; Novembre, John; Aldenderfer, Mark; Di Rienzo, Anna (2018). "The genetic prehistory of the Andean highlands 7000 years BP though European contact". Science Advances. American Association for the Advancement of Science (AAAS). 4 (11): eaau4921. doi:10.1126/sciadv.aau4921.
- Mamani Flores, Alberto, Néstor Condori Flores, Bertha Maquera Flores, Néstor Condori Flores, Rogelio Mamani Flores, Nery Beatriz Coaquira Choque, Edy Stanler Mamani Contreras, Belinia Ayma Maquera, Ronaldo Rudyard Condori Pilco, Sara Mariela Flores Coaquira, Luis Rubén Pilco Coaquira, Jhon Álex Condori Flores, Emily Camila Flores Coaquira, Érika Claudia Flores Coaquira, Virginia Incacoña Huaraya, Mateo Incacoña Huaraya, Cecilia Chávez Justo, Luis Ángel Flores Blanco, Elizabeth A. Klarich, Mark S. Aldenderfer, Sandro Alania Pari, Dilma Velásquez Llano and Randall Haas 2025 Los cazadores de Puno | the hunters of Puno | Puno suyuna nayra sallqa uywanaka katuri jaqinaka. Rafael Ediciones, Lima. doi:10.15786/wyoscholar/10062
- Ministerio de Cultura, Peru (2021) Resolución Viceministerial N° 000281-2021-VMPCIC/MC.
- Ocobock, Cara; Lacy, Sarah (2023) "Woman the hunter: The physiological evidence." American Anthropologist. doi:10.1111/aman.13915.
- Quinton, Amy; Kerlin, Kat (2021) "*Was* She a Badass?" UC Davis Unfold Podcast. Retrieved 31 October 2023.
- Smallwood, Ashley; Haas, Randall; Jennings, Thomas (2023) "Lithic usewear analysis confirms the function of Wilamaya Patjxa projectile points." Scientific Reports 2023. doi:10.1038/s41598-023-45743-7.
