= Qallu Larqanku =

Mountain in Peru

- Location within Peru

Highest point
- Elevation: 5,300 m (17,400 ft)
- Coordinates: 16°58′01″S 70°05′10″W

Geography
- Location: Peru, Puno Region
- Parent range: Andes

Qallu Larqanku (Aymara qallu braid; cattle with baby animals, Larqanku a mountain, Hispanicized spelling Callolarjanco) is a mountain in the Andes of southern Peru, about 5,300 m (17,400 ft) high. It is located in the Puno Region, El Collao Province, Santa Rosa District, southwest of a lake named Lurisquta. Qallu Larqanku lies northeast of Jisk'a Larqanku and Larqanku.

Qallu Larqanku is also the name of an intermittent stream which originates south of the mountain. The intermittent stream along its northern slope is named Larqanku Q'awa ("Larqanku brook", also spelled Larjoncocahua). It originates west of the mountain. Both streams are tributaries of the Uchusuma River.
