= P'isaqa Kunka =

Mountain in Peru

- K'ank'awi
- Location within Peru

Highest point
- Elevation: 4,900 m (16,100 ft)
- Coordinates: 16°45′26″S 70°00′24″W

Geography
- Location: Peru, Puno Region
- Parent range: Andes

P'isaqa Kunka (Aymara p'isaqa Nothoprocta, kunka throat, "p'isaqa's throat", hispanicized spelling Pisaccacunca) or K'ank'awi (Aymara k'ank'a opening, gap; crevice, -wi a suffix to indicate a place, "a place of crevices", hispanicized spelling Cancahui) ) is a mountain in the Andes of Peru, about 4,900 metres (16,076 ft) high. It is located in the Puno Region, El Collao Province, Santa Rosa District, north of a lake named Lurisquta. P'isaqa Kunka lies southwest of Kuntur Wawachawi.
