= Chuta Kunka =

Mountain in Peru

- Location within Peru

Highest point
- Elevation: 5,000 m (16,000 ft)
- Coordinates: 16°40′30″S 69°57′31″W

Geography
- Location: Peru, Puno Region
- Parent range: Andes

Chuta Kunka (Aymara chuta end of a terrain, border, kunka throat, "border's throat", hispanicized spelling Chutacunca) is a mountain in the Andes of Peru, about 5,000 metres (16,404 ft) high. It is located in the Puno Region, El Collao Province, Santa Rosa District, southeast of Sukata Laq'a and Chuqi Quta.
