= Queuñamolloco =

Mountain in Peru

- Location within Peru

Highest point
- Elevation: 5,000 m (16,000 ft)
- Coordinates: 16°37′20″S 70°00′33″W

Geography
- Location: Peru, Puno Region
- Parent range: Andes

Queuñamolloco (possibly from Aymara qiwña polylepis, mulluq'u round, round head and swirl) is a mountain in the Andes of Peru, about 5,000 metres (16,404 ft) high. It is located in the Puno Region, El Collao Province, Santa Rosa District. It lies northeast of Quinaquinani and southeast of Pacocahua.
