= Iscailarjanco =

Mountain in Peru

- Location within Peru

Highest point
- Elevation: 5,415 m (17,766 ft)
- Coordinates: 17°00′21″S 70°06′01″W

Geography
- Location: Peru, Puno Region, El Collao Province, Tacna Region, Candarave Province
- Parent range: Andes

Iscailarjanco (possibly from Aymara larqa irrigation channel, anku tendon; nerve, Larqanku a mountain, "little Larqanku") is a 5,415-metre-high (17,766 ft) mountain in the Andes of southern Peru It is located in the Puno Region, El Collao Province, Santa Rosa District, and in the Tacna Region, Candarave Province, Candarave District. It is southwest of Loriscota and southeast of Vizcacha Lake. Iscailarjanco lies northeast of Cancave, southwest of Pantiuso and south of Larjanco.

Iscarlaijanco is also the name of an intermittent stream which originates west the mountain near Cancave. It flows to the south. Another stream named Larjanco originates northwest of the mountain. It flows to Matasa River in the northwest.
