= Sukata Laq'a =

Mountain in Peru

- Location within Peru

Highest point
- Elevation: 5,100 m (16,700 ft)
- Coordinates: 16°39′56″S 69°58′19″W

Geography
- Location: Peru, Puno Region
- Parent range: Andes

Sukata Laq'a (Aymara sukaña to ploug a field as waru waru, -ta a participle, laq'a earth (soil), "earth ploughed as waru waru", Hispanicized spelling Socatalaca) is a mountain in the Andes of Peru, about 5,100 metres (16,732 ft) high. Sukata Laq'a is located in the Puno Region, El Collao Province, Santa Rosa District. It lies southwest of Chuqi Quta and northwest of Chuta Kunka.
