= Larqanku =

Mountain in Peru

- Location within Peru

Highest point
- Elevation: 5,585 m (18,323 ft)
- Coordinates: 16°59′13″S 70°05′42″W

Geography
- Location: Peru, Puno Region, El Collao Province, Tacna Region, Candarave Province
- Parent range: Andes

Larqanku (Aymara larqa irrigation channel, anku tendon; nerve, Hispanicized spelling Larjanco) is a 5,585-metre-high (18,323 ft) mountain in the Andes of southern Peru. It is located in the Puno Region, El Collao Province, Santa Rosa District, and in the Tacna Region, Candarave Province, Candarave District. It is southwest of Lurisquta and southeast of Wisk'acha Lake. Larqanku lies between Jisk'a Larqanku ("little Larqanku") in the south and Panti Usu in the northwest.
