= Wari Kunka (Peru) =

Mountain in Peru

- Location within Peru

Highest point
- Elevation: 4,800 m (15,700 ft)
- Coordinates: 16°47′23″S 69°55′32″W

Geography
- Location: Peru, Puno Region
- Parent range: Andes

Wari Kunka (Aymara wari vicuña, kunka throat, "vicuña throat", wari kunka a medical plant (Thamnolia vermicularis), Hispanicized spelling Huaricunca) is a mountain in the Andes of Peru, about 4,800 metres (15,748 ft) high. It is situated in the Puno Region, El Collao Province, Santa Rosa District. It lies northeast of the lake Lurisquta, northwest of the mountain Janq'u Q'awa.
