= Kuntur Wawachawi =

Mountain in Peru

- Location within Peru

Highest point
- Elevation: 5,000 m (16,000 ft)
- Coordinates: 16°45′02″S 69°59′09″W

Geography
- Location: Peru, Puno Region
- Parent range: Andes

Kuntur Wawachawi (Aymara kunturi condor, wawachaña, to give birth, -wi indicates the place of an action, "where the condor is born" Hispanicized spelling Condorguaguachave) is a mountain in the Andes of Peru, about 5,000 metres (16,404 ft) high. It is situated in the Puno Region, El Collao Province, Santa Rosa District. Kuntur Wawachawi lies east of the lake Lurisquta, between the mountain Wari Kunka in the southeast and Jach'a K'uchu in the northwest.
