= K'awchini =

Mountain in Peru

- Location within Peru

Highest point
- Elevation: 5,000 m (16,000 ft)
- Coordinates: 17°05′15″S 69°55′14″W

Geography
- Location: Peru, Puno Region, El Collao Province
- Parent range: Andes

K'awchini (Aymara k'awchi, k'awch'i big pot, -ni a suffix to indicate ownership, "the one with a big pot", Hispanicized spelling Cauchini) is a mountain in the Andes of southern Peru, about 5,000 metres (16,404 ft) high. It is situated in the Puno Region, El Collao Province, Santa Rosa District. K'awchini lies northwest of the mountain Wilantani.
