= Chuqi Luk'anani =

Mountain in Peru

- Location within Peru

Highest point
- Elevation: 5,200 m (17,100 ft)
- Coordinates: 16°59′14″S 70°5′13″W

Geography
- Location: Peru, Puno Region, El Collao Province
- Parent range: Andes

Chuqi Luk'anani (Aymara chuqi gold, luk'ana finger, -ni a suffix to indicate ownership, "the one with a gold finger", also spelled Choquelocanani, Chuquilacani) is a mountain in the Andes of southern Peru, about 5,200 metres (17,060 ft) high. It is situated in the Puno Region, El Collao Province, Santa Rosa District. Chuqi Luk'anani lies southeast of the mountain Panti Usu.
