= Santa Rosa District, El Collao =

Coordinates: 16.7421°S 69.7233°W

Santa Rosa District
- District
- Interactive map of Santa Rosa District
- Country: Peru
- Region: Puno
- Province: El Collao
- Founded: May 2, 1854
- Capital: Mazo Cruz

Government
  - Mayor: Ismael Acero Mamani

Area
  - Total: 2,524.02 km^{2} (974.53 sq mi)
- Elevation: 3,960 m (12,990 ft)

Population (2007 census)
  - Total: 6,663
  - Density: 2.640/km^{2} (6.837/sq mi)
- Time zone: UTC-5 (PET)
- UBIGEO: 210504

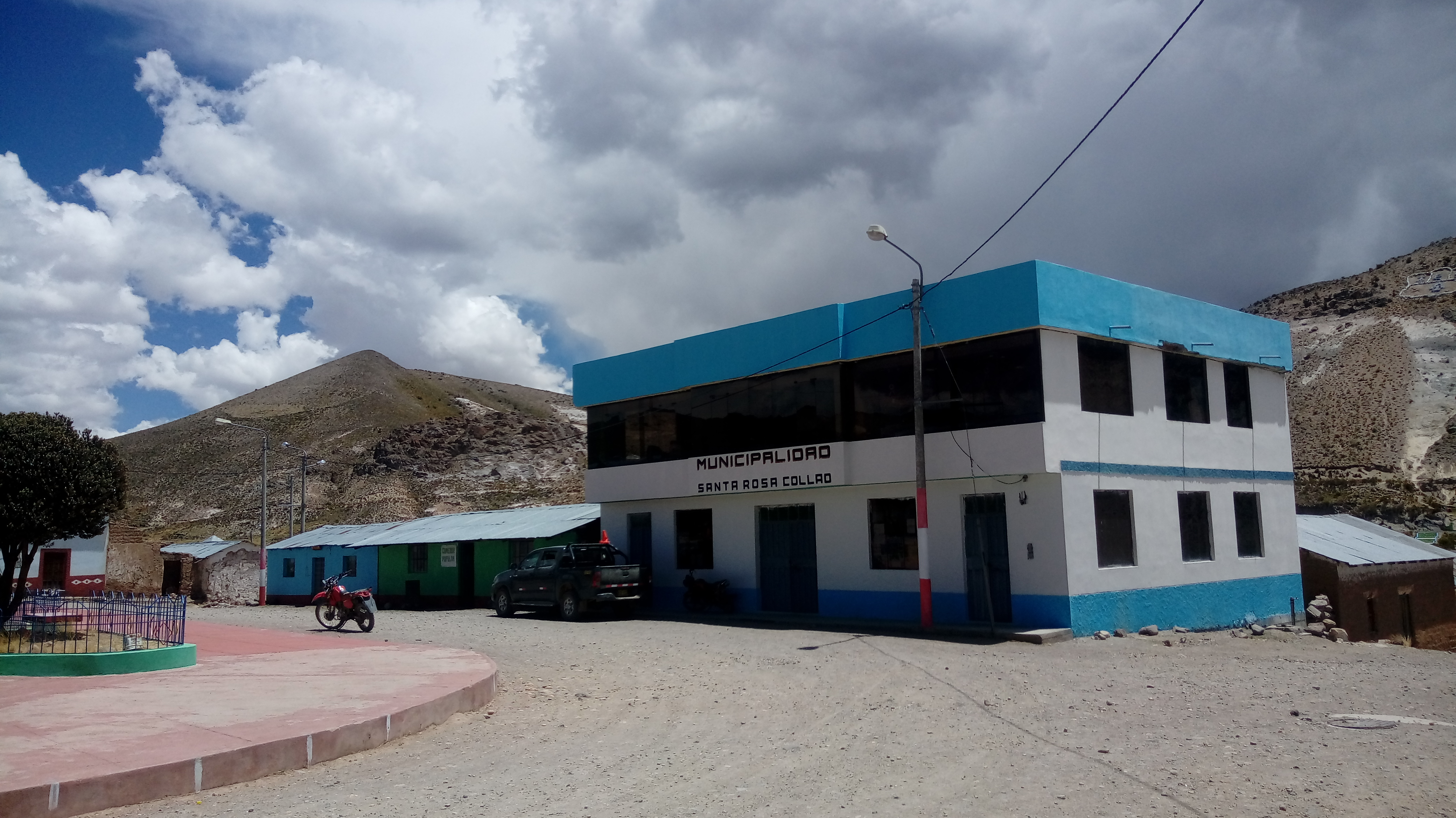
Municipality of Santa Rosa, El Collao, Puno.

Santa Rosa District is one of five districts of the province El Collao in Puno Region, Peru.

== History ==
Santa Rosa District was created on May 5, 1854.

== Geography ==
Some of the highest mountains of the district are listed below:

- Arichuwa
- Atapalluni
- Chinchillani
- Chuqi Luk'anani
- Chuqi Quta
- Chuqu Chuquni
- Chuta Kunka
- Illimani
- Iru Chunta
- Iru Qullu
- Jach'a K'uchu
- Janq'u Qachi
- Janq'u Q'awa
- Jisk'a Larqanku
- Jisk'a Mawruma
- Kuntur Wawachawi
- K'awchini
- Larqanku
- Llimani
- Llust'a K'uchu
- Mawruma
- Milluma
- Muru Qullu
- Panti Usu
- Phaq'u Q'awa
- P'isaqa Kunka
- Qallu Larqanku
- Qarwa P'iq'iña
- Qiwña Milluku
- Qiwña Mulluq'u
- Q'ulini
- Sukata Laq'a
- Suri
- Tanka Tankani
- Taruja
- Titi Uta
- Wanqani
- Waran Warani
- Wari Kunka
- Wila Chunkara
- Wila Jaqhi
- Wilantani

== Ethnic groups ==
The people in the district are mainly indigenous citizens of Aymara descent. Aymara is the language which the majority of the population (80.88%) learnt to speak in childhood, 18.39% of the residents started speaking using the Spanish language (2007 Peru Census).

== Climate ==
Climate data for Mazo Cruz, elevation 3,980 m (13,060 ft), (1991–2020)
Month	Jan	Feb	Mar	Apr	May	Jun	Jul	Aug	Sep	Oct	Nov	Dec	Year
Mean daily maximum °C (°F)	16.0 (60.8)	15.7 (60.3)	16.0 (60.8)	16.4 (61.5)	16.2 (61.2)	15.4 (59.7)	15.1 (59.2)	16.1 (61.0)	17.2 (63.0)	18.3 (64.9)	19.0 (66.2)	18.0 (64.4)	16.6 (61.9)
Mean daily minimum °C (°F)	0.9 (33.6)	0.9 (33.6)	−0.2 (31.6)	−3.9 (25.0)	−10.0 (14.0)	−13.0 (8.6)	−13.1 (8.4)	−11.9 (10.6)	−9.4 (15.1)	−7.0 (19.4)	−5.3 (22.5)	−1.6 (29.1)	−6.1 (21.0)
Average precipitation mm (inches)	141.3 (5.56)	120.1 (4.73)	69.6 (2.74)	24.8 (0.98)	5.0 (0.20)	2.0 (0.08)	3.6 (0.14)	7.6 (0.30)	8.5 (0.33)	18.0 (0.71)	25.5 (1.00)	75.4 (2.97)	501.4 (19.74)
Source: National Meteorology and Hydrology Service of Peru

== Mayors ==
- 2007-2014: Ismael Acero Mamani.

== Festivities ==
- May 3; Fiesta de las Cruces.
- May 5: Aniversario
- August 30: Santa Rosa de Lima

== See also ==
- Lurisquta
- Qillqatani
