= Llust'a K'uchu =

Mountain in Peru

- Location within Peru

Highest point
- Elevation: 4,800 m (15,700 ft)
- Coordinates: 16°54′05″S 69°46′16″W

Geography
- Location: Peru, Puno Region, El Collao Province
- Parent range: Andes

Llust'a K'uchu (Aymara llust'a slippery, k'uchu, q'uch'u corner, "slippery corner", hispanicized spelling Yustacucho) is a mountain in the Andes of southern Peru, about 4,800 metres (15,748 ft) high. It is situated in the Puno Region, El Collao Province, Santa Rosa District.
