= Pacocahua (Puno) =

Mountain in Peru

- Location within Peru

Highest point
- Elevation: 5,000 m (16,000 ft)
- Coordinates: 16°36′33″S 70°01′12″W

Geography
- Location: Peru, Puno Region
- Parent range: Andes

Pacocahua is a mountain in the Andes of Peru, about 5,000 metres (16,404 ft) high. It is situated in the Puno Region, El Collao Province, Santa Rosa District, and in the Puno Province, Acora District. It lies south of Coline and southeast of Arichua.

== Name ==
Pacocahua or Patocahu possibly derives from Aymara language terms phaq'u, paqu, or p'aqu meaning the color light brown, reddish, fair-haired, or dark chestnut, and q'awa meaning little river, ditch, crevice, fissure, or gap in the earth, the name thus meaning "brown brook" or "brown ravine".
