= Chivay obsidian source =

Type of obsidian (rock) found in South America

The Chivay obsidian source (15.6423° S, 71.5355° W, 4972 masl) is the geological origin of a chemically distinct type of obsidian that is found throughout the south-central Andean highlands including southern Peru and western Bolivia. Obsidian of this type is also known as the Cotallalli type or the Titicaca Basin type.

Studies have shown that up to 90% of artifacts from the Lake Titicaca Basin were made using obsidian from this source. These chemical characterization studies were performed using X-ray fluorescence (XRF) and Neutron Activation Analysis (NAA) techniques.

Obsidian from the Chivay source is found in large and homogeneous nodules in a high altitude volcanic crater approximately 10 kilometres (6.2 mi) to the east of the town of Chivay in the Colca Valley (Caylloma, Arequipa, Peru).

== Consumption sites ==
Obsidian from the Chivay source has been chemically identified among artifacts from over fifty sites in the south-central Andes. Chivay obsidian was the predominant type found at the Archaic and Formative period site of Jiskairumoko on the western side of Lake Titicaca in the Ilave Valley of Puno, Peru.
