= Pilcuyo District =

Coordinates: 16.1118°S 69.5563°W

Pilcuyo Pilkuyu
- District
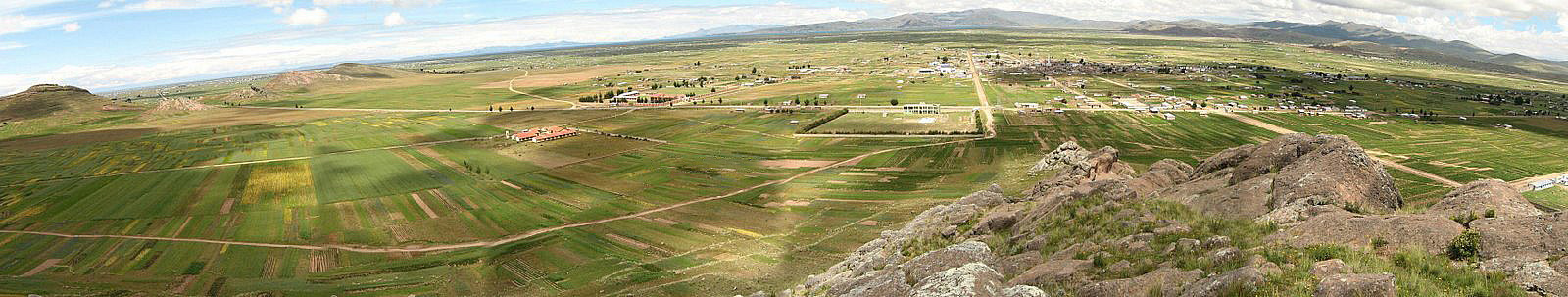
- Pilcuyo
- Interactive map of Pilcuyo
- Country: Peru
- Region: Puno
- Province: El Collao
- Founded: December 11, 1961
- Capital: Pilcuyo

Government
  - Mayor: Isidro Lupaca Ticona

Area
  - Total: 157 km^{2} (61 sq mi)
- Elevation: 3,836 m (12,585 ft)

Population (2005 census)
  - Total: 16,784
  - Density: 107/km^{2} (277/sq mi)
- Time zone: UTC-5 (PET)
- UBIGEO: 210503

Pilcuyo District is one of five districts of the province El Collao in Peru.

== Ethnic groups ==
The people in the district are mainly indigenous citizens of Aymara descent. Aymara is the language which the majority of the population (87.65%) learnt to speak in childhood, 11.72% of the residents started speaking using the Spanish language (2007 Peru Census).
