= Suri (Peru) =

Mountain in Peru

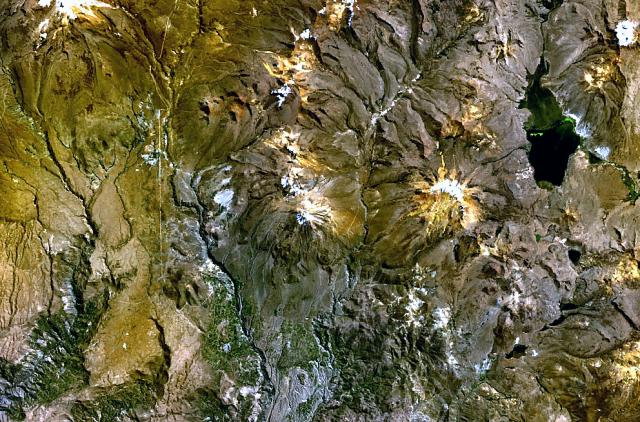
- The lake Wilaquta (on the right) and Suri northeast of it (upper right corner, snow-covered) as seen from above (NASA Landsat7 image)

Highest point
- Elevation: 5,400 m (17,700 ft)
- Coordinates: 17°04′07″S 69°59′33″W

Geography
- Location within Peru
- Location: Peru, Puno Region, El Collao Province
- Parent range: Andes

Suri (Aymara and Quechua for rhea) is a mountain in the Andes of southern Peru, about 5,400 metres (17,717 ft) high. It is situated in the Puno Region, El Collao Province, Santa Rosa District. Suri lies northeast of the lake Wilaquta and the mountain Chinchillani.
