= Titi Uta =

Mountain in Peru

- Location within Peru

Highest point
- Elevation: 4,800 m (15,700 ft)
- Coordinates: 16°48′36″S 69°39′36″W

Geography
- Location: Peru, Puno Region, El Collao Province
- Parent range: Andes

Titi Uta (Aymara titi Andean mountain cat; lead, lead-coloured, uta house, "mountain cat house" or "lead house", also spelled Titiuta) is a mountain in the Andes of southern Peru, about 4,800 metres (15,748 ft) high. It is situated in the Puno Region, El Collao Province, Santa Rosa District.
