= Conduriri District =

Coordinates: 16.6156°S 69.7025°W

Conduriri Kunturiri
- District
- Interactive map of Conduriri; Kunturiri
- Country: Peru
- Region: Puno
- Province: El Collao
- Founded: September 24, 1993
- Capital: Conduriri

Government
  - Mayor: Gumercindo Ninaraqui Cutipa

Area
  - Total: 1,005.67 km^{2} (388.29 sq mi)
- Elevation: 3,950 m (12,960 ft)

Population (2005 census)
  - Total: 4,277
  - Density: 4.253/km^{2} (11.01/sq mi)
- Time zone: UTC-5 (PET)
- UBIGEO: 210505

Conduriri District is one of five districts of the El Collao Province in Puno Region, Peru.

== Geography ==
One of the highest elevations of the district is Sura Patilla at 5,000 m (16,000 ft). Other mountains are listed below:

- Apachita
- Atapalluni
- Churu Uma
- Chilli Wiqu
- Chillkhani
- Ch'iyar Jaqhi
- Ch'uwaña
- Janq'u Qullu
- Kunturiri
- Laram Salla
- Laramani
- Mamaniri
- Muru Qullu
- Pata Jaqhi
- Pä Qullu
- Pukara
- Phaq'u Q'awa
- Surani
- Tanqa Tanqa
- Taypi Sirka
- T'ula Qullu
- Urqu Qullu
- Wankarani
- Warawarani
- Wila Kunka
- Wila Puraka
- Wila Purakani
- Wiluyu
- Willk'i Sirka

== Ethnic groups ==
The people in the district are mainly indigenous citizens of Aymara descent. Aymara is the language which the majority of the population (89.73%) learnt to speak in childhood, 9.80% of the residents started speaking using the Spanish language (2007 Peru Census).

== Authorities ==
=== Mayors ===
- 2011-2014:
- 2007-2010: Pedro Montalico Quenta.

== See also ==
- Administrative divisions of Peru
