= Qillqatani =

Archaeological site in Peru

Quelcatani
- Qillqatani
- Qelqatani
- location in Peru
- 16°56′58″S 69°53′22″W
- Location: Peru, Puno Region
- Region: Lake Titicaca basin

History
- Built: c. 7500 BP
- Abandoned: 1472 AD

Site notes
- Elevation: 4,420 m (14,500 ft)
- Area: 200 m^{2} (2,153 sq ft)
- Archaeologists: Mark Aldenderfer

Qillqatani (Aymara qillqaña to write, -ta a suffix to indicate the participle, -ni a suffix to indicate ownership, "the one with something written", Hispanicized Qelqatani, Quelcatani) is an archaeological site in Peru. It is located above the Rio Chila, in the Puno Region, El Collao Province, Santa Rosa District, at a height of about 5 m (16 ft) above the riverbed. Qillqatani is surrounded by dry puna.

The site was declared a National Cultural Heritage (Patrimonio Cultural) of Peru. Qillqatani is known for its elaborate rock art panels.

== Archaeology ==
Qillqatani is the first archaeological site in the Lake Titicaca basin to be systematically excavated. Archaeologists have identified 36 cultural strata at the site. From 7500 to 4000 BP, Qillqatani was inhabited by hunter-gatherers as a seasonal campsite. These early occupants hunted mostly camelids, and some deer. From 3660 BP onwards, Qillqatani was inhabited by pastoralist camelid-herders who built houses and began to occupy the site long-term. These later occupants also began to trade with people from lower attitudes to obtain Chenopodium.

== See also ==
- Jiskairumoko
- Soro Mik'aya Patjxa

== Bibliography ==
- Peregrine, Peter N.; et al., eds. (2001). Encyclopedia of Prehistory Volume 7: South America.
