= Current Anthropology =

Academic journal on anthropology

- Discipline: Anthropology
- Language: English
- Edited by: Caroline Schuster; Catherine J. Frieman

Publication details
- History: 1959–present
- Publisher: University of Chicago Press for the Wenner-Gren Foundation for Anthropological Research (USA)
- Frequency: Bimonthly
- Open access: Hybrid
- Impact factor: 3.226 (2021)

Standard abbreviations
- ISO 4: Curr. Anthropol.

Indexing
- ISSN: 0011-3204 (print); 1537-5382 (web)

Links
- Journal homepage; Online archive

Current Anthropology is a peer-reviewed anthropology academic journal published by the University of Chicago Press for the Wenner-Gren Foundation for Anthropological Research. Founded in 1959 by the anthropologist Sol Tax (1907-1995). Current Anthropology is one of very few journals that publishes research across all sub-disciplines of anthropology, encompassing the full range of anthropological scholarship on human cultures and on human and other primate species. Communicating across the subfields, the journal features papers in a wide variety of areas, including social, cultural, physical and linguistic anthropology as well as ethnology, ethnohistory, archaeology, prehistory and folklore. Laurence Ralph (Princeton University) replaced Mark Aldenderfer (University of California, Merced) as the editor-in-chief of the journal on January 1, 2019.

According to the Journal Citation Reports, the journal has a 2021 impact factor of 3.226, ranking it 10th out of 93 journals in the category "Anthropology".

Current Applications is an open-access section of Current Anthropology that presents research bridging academic and applied anthropology. Recent Current Applications papers have addressed wind energy and the New Jersey shore, African asylum-seekers, and the popular television show Bones.
