= Janq'u Q'awa (El Collao) =

Mountain in Peru

- Location within Peru

Highest point
- Elevation: 5,000 m (16,000 ft)
- Coordinates: 16°49′30″S 69°54′28″W

Geography
- Location: Peru, Puno Region, El Collao Province
- Parent range: Andes

Janq'u Q'awa (Aymara janq'u white, q'awa little river, ditch, crevice, fissure, gap in the earth, "white brook" or "white ravine", Hispanicized spelling Aconcahua) is a mountain in the Andes of Peru, about 5,000 metres (16,404 ft) high. It is situated in the Puno Region, El Collao Province, Santa Rosa District. It lies northeast of the lake Lurisquta.

Janq'u Q'awa is also the name of an intermittent stream which originates near the mountain. It flows to Lurisquta.
