= Soro Mik'aya Patjxa =

Archaeological site in Peru

- Location in Peru
- 16°14′2″S 69°43′30″W
- Type: open-air seasonal residential site
- Periods: Middle to Late Archaic periods
- Associated with: hunter–gatherers
- Region: Ilave Basin, Lake Titicaca Basin, Andean Altiplano

History
- Built: 8,000 BP
- Abandoned: 6,700 BP

Site notes
- Elevation: 3,860 m (12,660 ft)
- Area: 2,800 m^{2} (30,139 sq ft)

Soro Mik'aya Patjxa is a high-altitude archaeological site located in the Ilave Basin in Peru, about 30 km (19 mi) west of the current shoreline of Lake Titicaca. Soro Mik'aya Patjxa was a seasonal residential site that was reused consistently by hunter-gatherers over a period of over a thousand years.

== Description ==
Situated on a fluvial terrace, the site was first identified by Mark Aldenderfer in 1995. The excavated portion of Soro Mik'aya Patjxa consists of one cultural layer of interest. 13 pits were excavated at the site. The site was occupied at least 1,500 years before the advent of low-level agriculture in the region at around 5,000 BP.

== Artefacts ==
Over 80,000 artefacts were recovered at the site. The artefact assemblage at Soro Mik'aya Patjxa consists primarily of flaked lithics, and also includes bones, ground stones, charred plant remains, pigment stones (red ocher) and ceramic sherds. As the ceramic sherds were found to stylistically post-date 1,000 AD, the sherds are considered to be intrusive.

== Human remains ==
The remains of 16 individuals were recovered from pit burials at the site. Five of the crania from the site exhibit signs of intentional cranial modification. Isotopic analysis, estimates of travel distance to nearby lower elevation areas, demographic profiling, and the evidence for the high use of local lithic materials suggest that the individuals at Soro Mik'aya Patjxa were permanent inhabitants of a high-altitude environment.

== Diet ==
The people at Soro Mik'aya Patjxa likely relied heavily on hunting large, terrestrial mammals and intensive processing and consumption of plants. Projectile points dominate the flaked lithic assemblage at Soro Mik'aya Patjxa. Additionally, the faunal assemblage is dominated by large mammals, most likely coming from Hippocamelus antisensis and the vicuña. The remains of guinea pig, Lagidium viscacia and carache fish were also identified from the small faunal remains at the site. The majority of the faunal bones recovered from the site shows evidence of burning.

The presence of large quantities of ground stones at the site and dental wear analysis indicate that the consumption of plants was an important part of the diet at Soro Mik'aya Patjxa. Only one of the 251 teeth recovered from the site shows evidence for dental caries, a low rate which is typical of hunter-gatherers. Dental wear analysis suggests a diet typical of terrestrial hunter-gatherers. Dental wear analysis also reveals evidence for lingual surface attrition of the maxillary anterior teeth (LSAMAT), a condition which has been linked with the intensive consumption of tubers by hunter-gatherers.

== Archaeogenetics ==
In 2018, researchers successfully sequenced the genome from SMP5, a 50-55 male directly dated to around 6800 BP. SMP5 shares a genetic component with later ancient DNA samples from the Lake Titicaca region, a component that is also found in modern Andean populations. When compared against modern populations, SMP5 shows closest genetic affinity for the Quechua people and the Aymara people. Unlike later ancient individuals sequenced from the Lake Titicaca region, SMP5, along with USR1 from the Upward Sun River site, Anzick-1, Kennewick man, and the individual tested from the Saqqaq culture, shows a genetic affinity for modern Siberian populations, especially the Yakuts.

== See also ==
- Jiskairumoko
- Qillqatani
