= Mawruma =

Mountain in Peru

- Location within Peru

Highest point
- Elevation: 5,242 m (17,198 ft)
- Coordinates: 16°38′56″S 70°00′08″W

Geography
- Location: Peru, Moquegua Region, Puno Region
- Parent range: Andes

Mawruma (Aymara mawri a little fish which lives in the Altiplano, uma water, "mawri water(s)", possibly erroneously also spelled Maruma) is a 5,242-metre-high (17,198 ft) mountain in the Peruvian Andes. It is situated in the Moquegua Region, Mariscal Nieto Province, Carumas District, and in the Puno Region, El Collao Province, Santa Rosa District. Mawruma lies southwest of the mountain Jisk'a Mawruma ("little Mawruma", Jiscamauroma), northwest of Chuqi Quta and Qiwña Milluku, and southeast of Qina Qinani. Southeast of Mawruma an intermittent stream named Mawrini ("the one with mawri", Maurini) originates. It flows to the northeast.
