= Chuqu Chuquni =

Mountain in Peru

- Location within Peru

Highest point
- Elevation: 5,000 m (16,000 ft)
- Coordinates: 16°32′08″S 69°54′05″W

Geography
- Location: Peru, Puno Region
- Parent range: Andes

Chuqu Chuquni (Aymara chuqu chuqu icicle, -ni a suffix, "the one with many icicles", hispanicized spelling Chojochojone) is a mountain in the Andes of Peru, about 5,000 metres (16,404 ft) high. It is located in the Puno Region, El Collao Province, Santa Rosa District.
