= Coline (Peru) =

Mountain in Peru

- Location within Peru

Highest point
- Elevation: 5,140 m (16,860 ft)
- Coordinates: 16°35′54″S 70°01′27″W

Geography
- Location: Peru, Puno Region
- Parent range: Andes

Coline (possibly from Aymara q'uli stripes of different colors on the shirt or undershirt which the Andean people wear, -ni a suffix to indicate ownership, "the one with stripes") is a mountain in the Andes of Peru, about 5,140 metres (16,864 ft) high. It is situated in the Puno Region, El Collao Province, Santa Rosa District, and in the Puno Province, Acora District. It lies northeast of the mountain Arichua.
