= Mark Aldenderfer =

American anthropologist and archaeologist

Mark S. Aldenderfer (born 1950) is an American anthropologist and archaeologist. He is the MacArthur Professor of Anthropology at the University of California, Merced where he was previously the Dean of the School of Social Sciences, Humanities, and Arts. He has served as Professor of Anthropology at the University of Arizona, and the University of California, Santa Barbara. Aldenderfer received his Ph.D. from Penn State University in 1977. He is known in particular for his comparative research into high-altitude adaptation, and for contributions to quantitative methods in archaeology. He has also served as editor of several journals in anthropology and archaeology.

== Research contributions ==
His research themes include the origins of settled village life, human adaptation to high altitude environments, hunting and gathering, and early plant and animal domestication. Aldenderfer has made important contributions to understanding the Archaic and Formative period peoples of the south-central Andes through active field projects in southern Peru. He has directed excavation projects at the sites of Asana, Qillqatani, and Jisk'a Iru Muqu, and survey projects in the Osmore valley (Moquegua, Peru) and in river valleys in the Lake Titicaca Basin. Since 1997 he has also conducted research on Buddhist and pre-Buddhist occupations in the Himalaya through field research in far western Tibet. He has also done fieldwork in Mesoamerica, Ethiopia, and in the United States.

== Editorial work ==
From 2008-2018, Aldenderfer served in the role of editor-in-chief for the journal Current Anthropology. He has served as the editor of Latin American Antiquity and the Society for American Archaeology Bulletin (now the SAA Archaeological Record). He is currently a Deputy Editor for the open access journal Science Advances.
