= Chuqi Quta =

Mountain in Peru

- Location within Peru

Highest point
- Elevation: 5,200 m (17,100 ft)
- Coordinates: 16°39′32″S 69°57′49″W

Geography
- Location: Peru, Puno Region
- Parent range: Andes

Chuqi Quta (Aymara chuqi gold, quta lake, "gold lake", Hispanicized spelling Choquecota) is a mountain in the Andes of Peru, about 5,200 metres (17,060 ft) high. It is located in the Puno Region, El Collao Province, Santa Rosa District. It lies southwest of Jisk'a Mawruma.
