= Wilantani =

Mountain in Peru

- Location within Peru

Highest point
- Elevation: 5,000 m (16,000 ft)
- Coordinates: 17°06′39″S 69°52′47″W

Geography
- Location: Peru, Puno Region, El Collao Province
- Parent range: Andes

Wilantani (Aymara, Hispanicized spelling Vilantani) is a mountain in the Andes of southern Peru, about 5,000 metres (16,404 ft) high. It is situated in the Puno Region, El Collao Province, Santa Rosa District. Wilantani lies northeast of the mountain Wila Chunkara.
