= Olla común =

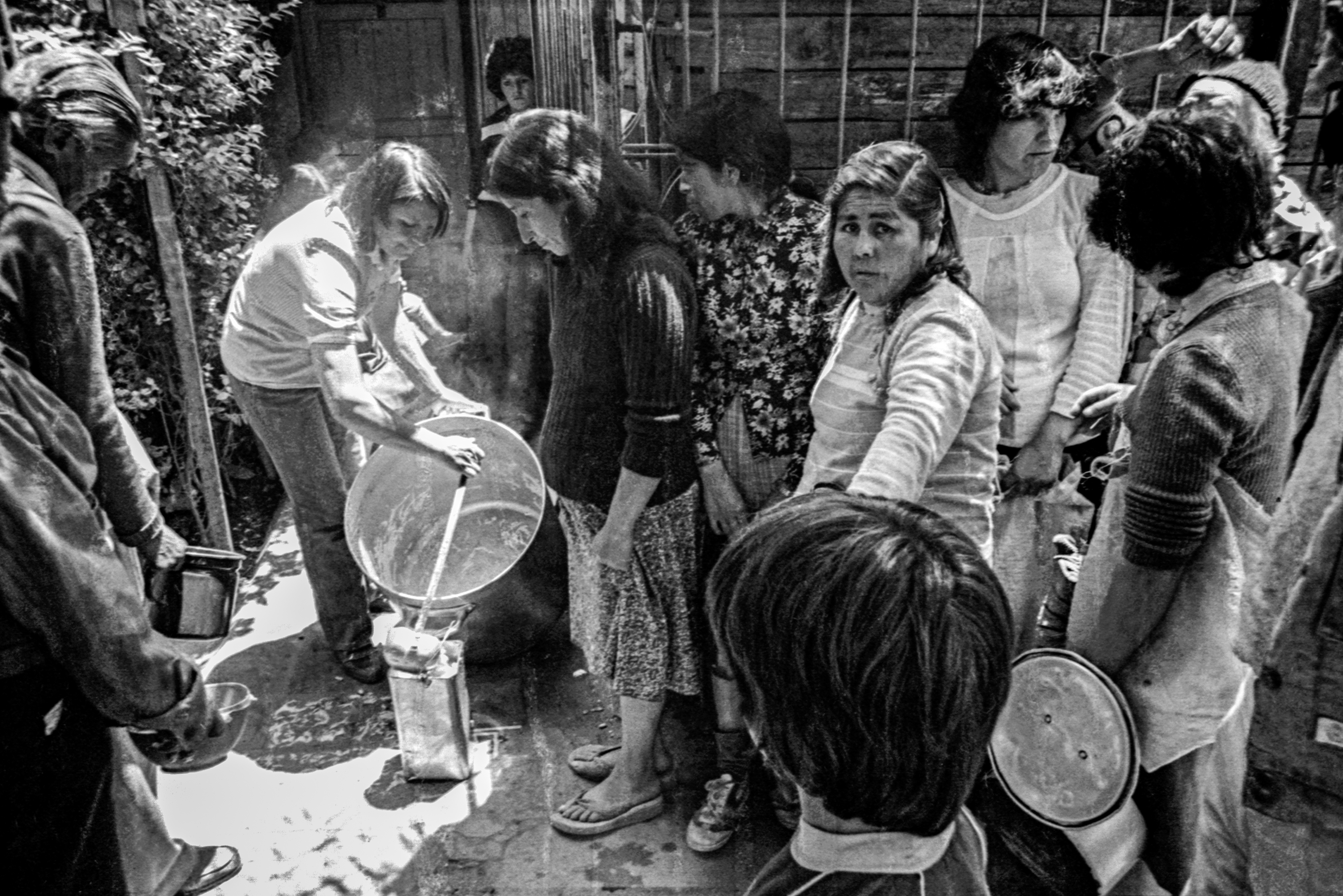
Olla común in Santiago de Chile in August 1984. Photograph by Paulo Slachevsky.

Olla común (common pot), also called olla popular (popular pot), is an instance of community participation between neighbors and residents who seek to solve the basic need to eat. It is similar to a soup kitchen, although with a more self-managed and independent character.

The ollas comunes are developed in different ways: collecting food among the neighbors or through collections of money in chapels, parishes and neighborhood associations to buy food. They are born within social contexts of poverty and unemployment, as subsistence organizations or "popular micro-associations that developed to satisfy a basic and functional need", hunger.

== History ==
=== Great Depression ===
The Great Depression caused a strong economic crisis between 1930 and 1932, affecting saltpeter and copper exports, which is why it has been considered the nation most affected by the crisis.

The economic crisis increased unemployment rates and caused a migration of unemployed nitrate miners from northern Chile to the capital, Santiago. Due to the layoff of nitrate workers, common pots multiplied in the country's capital, and homeless people began to live in caves in the hills that surround said city.

=== Revival in the 1980s ===
The implementation of the neoliberal system and the new institutional framework of the military dictatorship, promised economic growth at the cost of an increase in foreign debt, the so-called "Miracle of Chile". Despite these apparent figures, the popular sectors were located in a kind of "parallel world" since unemployment, which already reached 30% by 1983, the notable decrease in purchasing power, the eradication of housing and the repressive blockade suffered by the populations, showed, in a certain sense, the violent and segregating focus of the system that had been building and justifying itself through figures that portrayed an apparent "economic progress."

=== COVID-19 pandemic ===
In 2021, "ollas comunes" multiplied in several Latin American countries and the world due to the increase in poverty and therefore famine, due to the restrictive measures taken by governments to prevent the spread of COVID-19. Many people were unable to work for months due to the restrictive measures, as many others were laid off or lost their businesses.
