= Jisk'a Iru Muqu =

Archaeological site in Peru

- Jiskairumoko
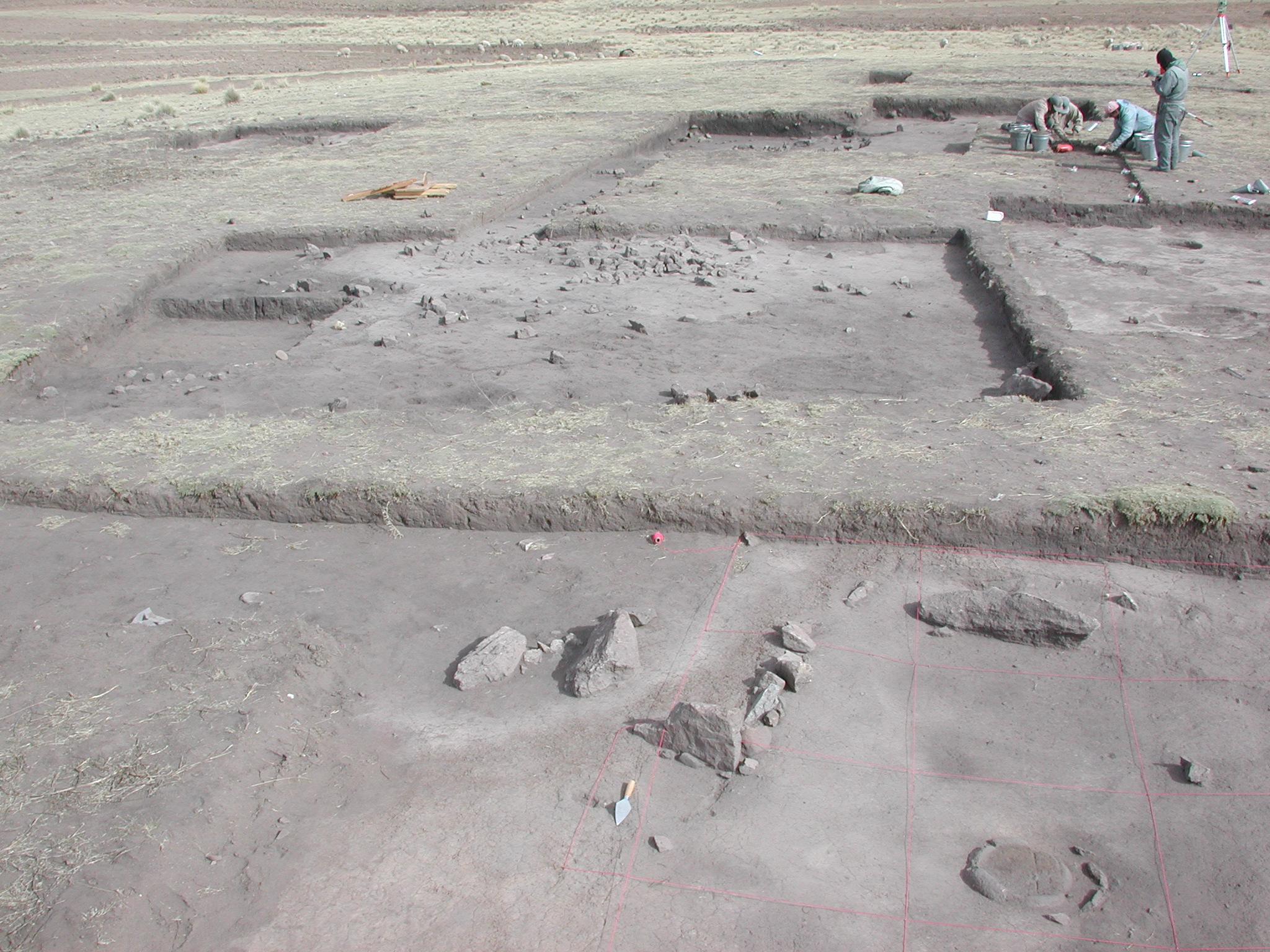
- Excavations at the site of Jisk'a Iru Muqu in 2002

- Location within Peru
- 16°12′40″S 69°45′50″W
- Type: open-air village site
- Periods: Late Archaic to Early Formative
- Cultures: South-Central Highland
- Location: Puno Region, Peru
- Region: Ilave Valley, Lake Titicaca Basin

History
- Built: Approximately 3,400 BC
- Abandoned: Approximately 1,600 BC

Site notes
- Elevation: 3,890 m (12,760 ft)
- Area: 0.4 ha (0.99 acres)

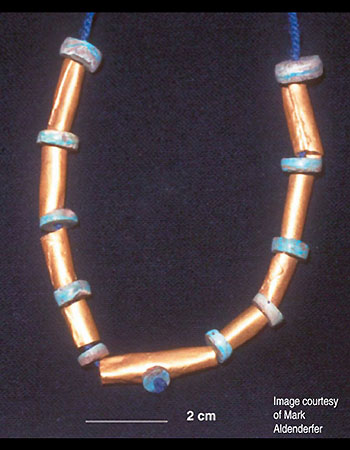
Gold necklace recovered from Jiskairumoko

Jisk'a Iru Muqu (Aymara, jisk'a small, iru a type of grass, (Festuca orthophylla), muqu knot; joint of a part of the reed, also spelled Jiskairumoko, Jisk'airumoko) is a pre-Columbian archaeological site 54 kilometers (34 mi) south-east of Puno, Peru. The site lies in the mountains at elevation 4,115 meters (13,500 feet), in the Aymara community of Jachacachi, adjacent to the Ilave River drainage, of the Lake Titicaca Basin, Peru. Occupation of Jisk'a Iru Muqu spans from the Late Archaic to the Formative.

== Research ==
The site was first formally recorded by Mark Aldenderfer in 1994, during a pedestrian survey of the Ilave River. The first excavations at the site were conducted in 1995. Jisk'a Iru Muqu is the first Archaic open-air site excavated in the Lake Titicaca Basin. Under the direction of Aldenderfer, a team from University of California, Santa Barbara, including Nathan Craig and Nicholas Tripcevich, conducted additional excavations at the site during the austral winters of 1999–2004. In-field geographic information system (GIS) methods were used in recording exposed surfaces. The site was plowed by tractor in 2005.

== Results and interpretations ==
Jisk'a Iru Muqu plays a significant role in understanding the pre-Columbian history of Andean Peru due to: early prestige objects, architectural transitions, variation in structure internal organization, ritual preparation embedded in domestic use areas, and the formation of regular trade routes.

=== Early prestige objects ===
Nine gold beads were found in the grave of an older adult and a juvenile buried adjacent to a Terminal Archaic pit house. Charcoal recovered from the burial dates the gold beads to 2155-1936 cal BC, which makes them the earliest known gold artifacts in the Americas. The burial of the objects with the deceased implies the wealth and prestige of its owner through the disposal and remove from display and recirculation. The find bolsters the concept that metalworking developed from multiple independent technologies that were focused on native materials.

=== Architectural transitions ===
Domestic architecture exposed during excavation is the earliest evidence of reduced residential mobility in the region. Three pithouses, a semisubterranean structure, and two above ground structures were exposed during excavation. Twenty-five radiocarbon dates show that pithouses occurred early (ca. 3200 cal BC), the semisubterranean structure is intermediate, and above ground prepared floor structures occurred later (ca. 1400 cal BC). This change in residential structures from pithouses to above ground structures is another example of a classic architectural transition observed in many parts of the world.

Jisk'a Iru Muqu Structure Dimensions
Structure Type	Area (m^{2})	Perim (m)	Depth/ Thickness (cm)	Internal Storage (l)	External Storage (l)
Pithouse 1	13.20	12.92	0.41	420	80
Pithouse 1 Outer	18.69	14.56	0.16	–	-
Pithouse 2	8.47	11	0.18	–	860
Pithouse 3	5.21	7.92	0.32	130	510
Semi-Subterranean 1	15.18	14.76	0.25	180	1400
Rectangular 1	9.85	12.95	0.1	–	-
Rectangular 2	22.96	20.66	0.15-0.2	–	-

Jisk'a Iru Muqu Structure Images

Pithouse 1

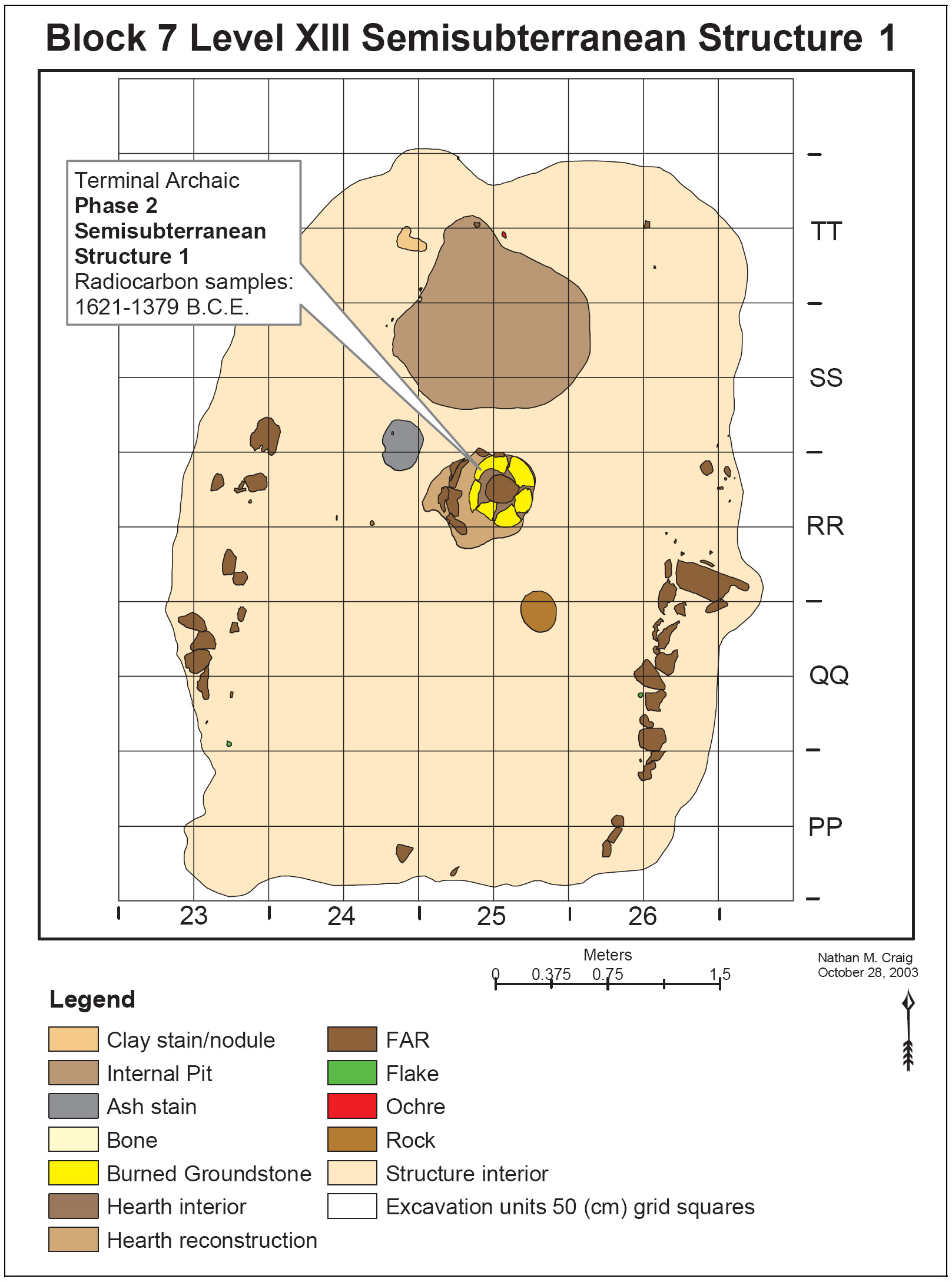
Semi Subterranean Structure 1

Rectangular Structure 1

=== Organization of space ===
The patterns of genetic relatedness and resource sharing are important variables for understanding the social structure of a village. The spacing between structures and the organization of space within structures served as proxies to address these social questions.

Ethnoarchaeological research shows that among use labor of subsistence based economies, as space between structures increases there is a decrease in the level of genetic relatedness and sharing between occupants of the structures. Among mobile peoples, increased formality in the internal organization of space tends to be correlated with longer term residential occupations. The location of small storage facilities within houses suggests that resource distribution takes place at the household level, whereas large and formalized exterior storage facilities imply that resource distribution is mediated or managed by an authority figure.

The excavators of Jiskairumoko defined three types of structures each of which showed differences in the spacing between like structure, the internal organization of space, and storage. These variations imply shifts in social relations during the occupation of the site. Pithouses 1-3 had the lowest distance between structures, this implies "high relatedness" and sharing between structure occupants. These pithouses all contained small yet numerous internal alcoves. These were interpreted as storage facilities. The numerous small alcoves suggest that storage was limited, and that resource distribution was a household affair that was not mediated by an individual with supra-household authority like a headman. None of the pithouses contained kitchen rocks. (Large stones used to support containers or serving as work surfaces.)

Semi-Subterranean structures were spaced considerably further apart. This suggests a decline in the level of genetic relatedness between structure occupants and indicates that sharing between structure occupants also declined. Storage in the deepest occupational levels of Semi-subterranean Structure 1 was composed of a single large pit in the floor. These lower occupational layers were not associated with kitchen rocks. Internal storage features were not present in later occupational levels of Semi-Subterranean Structure 1. However, kitchen rocks were used during the later occupations of Semi-Subterranean Structure 1. Rectangular Structures were spaced further apart than the pithouses, but were not spaced as far apart as Semi-Subterranean structures. No recognizable internal storage features were encountered in either Rectangular Structure 1 or 2. This implies that either storage was practiced in a form that did not leave a recognizable archaeological signature, or all storage was exterior. Both of the Rectangular Structures contained kitchen rocks.

At the Archaic village of Jiskairumoko, it appears that over time genetic relatedness and sharing decreased. Storage appears to have become more centralized within structures and the use of internal storage pits was eventually abandoned. About this same time the occupants of the structures began using kitchen rocks. This suggests that processing or serving activities took on greater importance within residential architecture.

=== Ritual preparations ===
In the sense used by Émile Durkheim, the Late and Terminal Archaic residents of Jiskairumoko exhibited a simple cultural pattern. This does not imply the residents were simple, it indicates that components of culture (economic practices, political structures, spiritual practice) were embedded rather than strongly differentiated. At Jiskairumoko, the earliest pithouse, radiocarbon dated to ca. 3200 cal BC, appears to have served as a place of ritual preparation. Evidence for this comes in the form of thermal processing of ochre for use as a mineral pigment. At Jiskairumoko, these same ochre pigments were found sprinkled at the base of graves found outside some of the other pithouses While rituals appear to have taken place within the site's oldest pithouse, regular domestic activities were also performed in this dwelling. Therefore, ritual and domestic activities were embedded spatially within the same architecture. During later periods of time in Andean Pre-Columbian history cultures became much more complex, and often ritual architecture is separated from domestic structures.

=== Development of regular trade routes ===
Excavations at Jiskairumoko recovered sixty eight obsidian tools. Elemental characterization of these fingers was performed by X-ray fluorescence (XRF), at the Berkeley XRF laboratory under the direction of Steven Shackley and by portable XRF by Jeff Speakman and Rachel Popelka-Filcoff from the Archaeometry Laboratory at the University of Missouri Research Reactor MURR. This research constitutes the largest sourcing program of Andean Archaic Period obsidian. Results eyes that all but two of the 68 obsidian fingers (97%) could be assigned to the Chivay obsidian source. The other two artifacts were assigned to the Alca obsidian source. Both sources are located in the Arequipa Region. The Chivay obsidian source is linked to the Colca Canyon, and the Alca obsidian source is located at the Cotahuasi Valley.

=== Archaeobotany ===
The remains of potato and Phaseolus were identified from starch grains recovered from grinding tools found at the site.

== See also ==
- Excavation
- GIS in archaeology
- Soro Mik'aya Patjxa
