= Ilave =

Ilave Illawi
- Town
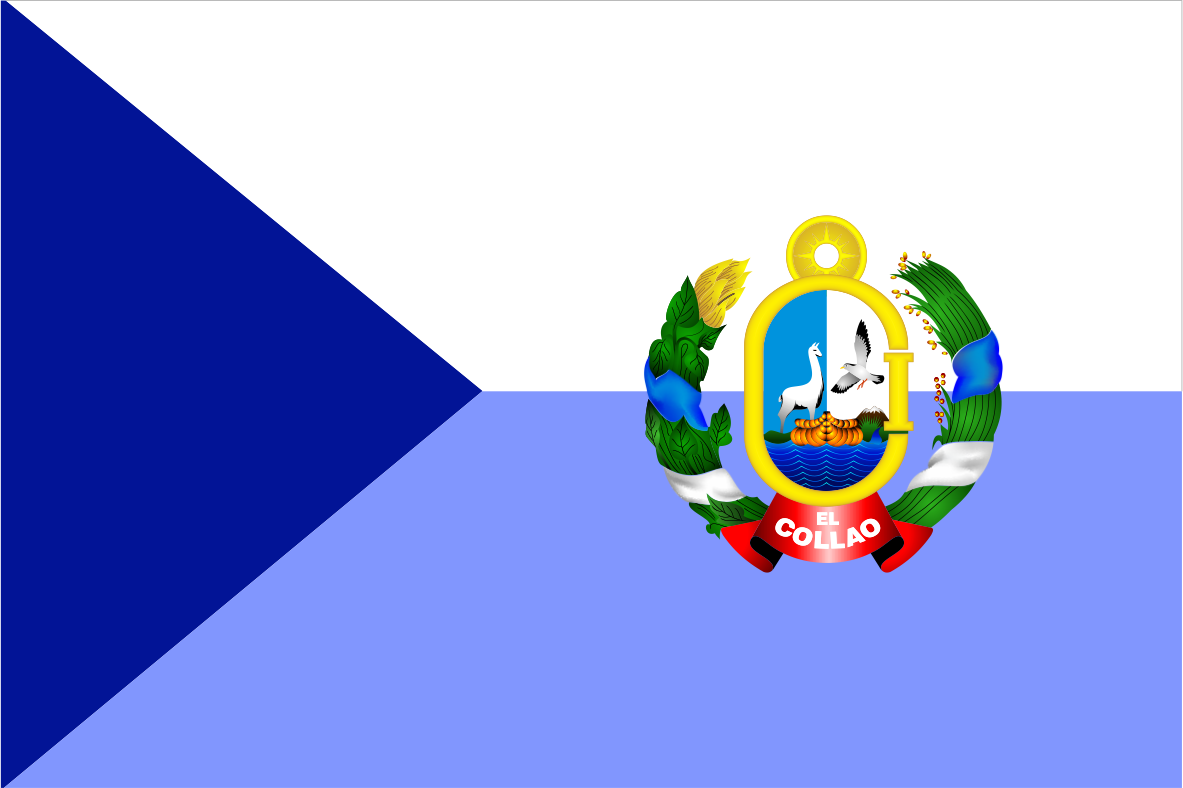
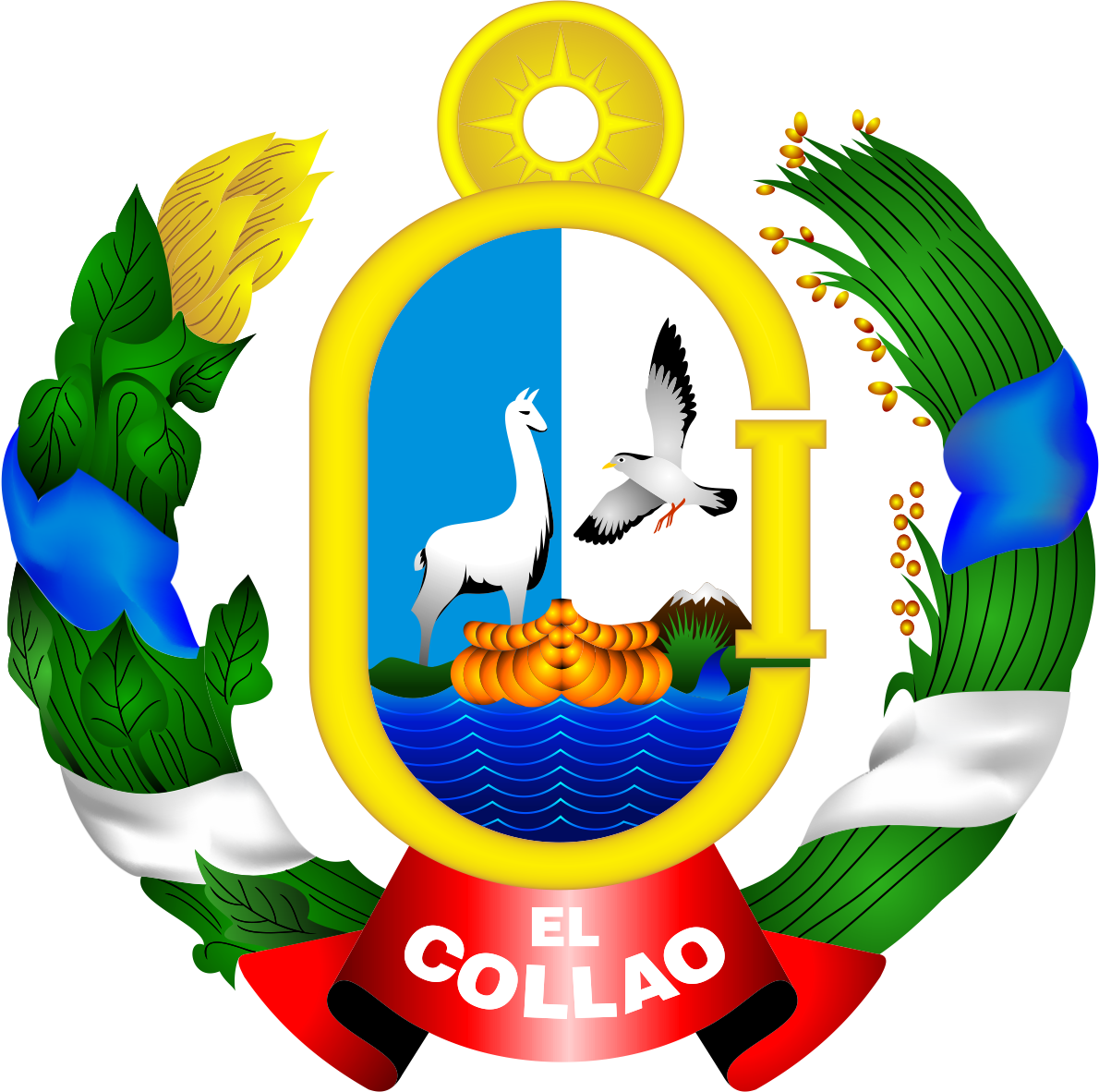
- Flag Coat of arms

- Location within Peru
- Coordinates: 16°05′01″S 69°38′18″W
- Country: Peru
- Region: Puno
- Province: El Collao
- District: Ilave
- Founded: 1782
- Elevation: 3,862 m (12,671 ft)

Population
  - Estimate (2015): 28,483
- Website: municollao.gob.pe

Ilave, also known as Illawi, is the capital city of the Ilave District in El Collao Province, in the Puno Region of Peru. According to the projection of the 2012 census, it has 57,366 inhabitants. It is located on the Ilave River and west from Lake Titicaca.

== Climate ==
Climate data for Ilave, elevation 3,874 m (12,710 ft), (1991–2020)
Month	Jan	Feb	Mar	Apr	May	Jun	Jul	Aug	Sep	Oct	Nov	Dec	Year
Mean daily maximum °C (°F)	15.0 (59.0)	15.1 (59.2)	15.1 (59.2)	15.3 (59.5)	15.0 (59.0)	14.2 (57.6)	14.1 (57.4)	14.8 (58.6)	15.5 (59.9)	16.4 (61.5)	17.0 (62.6)	16.4 (61.5)	15.3 (59.6)
Mean daily minimum °C (°F)	4.9 (40.8)	5.1 (41.2)	4.6 (40.3)	2.6 (36.7)	−0.6 (30.9)	−2.6 (27.3)	−3.0 (26.6)	−1.7 (28.9)	0.4 (32.7)	2.3 (36.1)	3.4 (38.1)	4.5 (40.1)	1.7 (35.0)
Average precipitation mm (inches)	164.6 (6.48)	136.4 (5.37)	110.3 (4.34)	41.3 (1.63)	10.1 (0.40)	4.8 (0.19)	7.2 (0.28)	12.6 (0.50)	22.6 (0.89)	36.3 (1.43)	39.4 (1.55)	95.8 (3.77)	681.4 (26.83)
Source: National Meteorology and Hydrology Service of Peru

== See also ==
- Ilave River
