= Jisk'a Mawruma =

Mountain in Peru

- Location within Peru

Highest point
- Elevation: 5,000 m (16,000 ft)
- Coordinates: 16°38′45″S 69°57′16″W

Geography
- Location: Peru, Puno Region
- Parent range: Andes

Jisk'a Mawruma (Aymara jisk'a little, mawri a little fish which lives in the Altiplano, uma water, Mawruma the name of a neighboring mountain, "little mawri water(s)" or "little Mawruma", Hispanicized spelling Jiscamauroma) is a mountain in the Peruvian Andes, about 5,000 metres (16,404 ft) high. It is situated in the Puno Region, El Collao Province, Santa Rosa District. It lies northeast of the mountains Mawruma and Chuqi Quta. South of Jisk'a Mawruma an intermittent stream named Mawrini ("the one with mawri", Maurini) originates. It flows to the northeast.
