= Ilave District =

Ilave
- District
- Interactive map of Ilave
- Coordinates: 16°6′10″S 69°36′22″W
- Country: Peru
- Region: Puno
- Province: El Collao
- Capital: Ilave

Government
  - Mayor: Mario Huanca Flores

Area
  - Total: 874.57 km^{2} (337.67 sq mi)
- Elevation: 3,847 m (12,621 ft)

Population (2007 census)
  - Total: 54,138
  - Density: 61.902/km^{2} (160.33/sq mi)
- Time zone: UTC-5 (PET)
- UBIGEO: 210501

Ilave District is one of five districts of the province El Collao in Puno Region, Peru.

== Ethnic groups ==
The people in the district are mainly indigenous citizens of Aymara descent. Aymara is the language which the majority of the population (73.26%) learnt to speak in childhood, 25.76% of the residents started speaking using the Spanish language (2007 Peru Census).

== Climate ==
Climate data for Ilave, elevation 3,874 m (12,710 ft), (1991–2020)
Month	Jan	Feb	Mar	Apr	May	Jun	Jul	Aug	Sep	Oct	Nov	Dec	Year
Mean daily maximum °C (°F)	15.0 (59.0)	15.1 (59.2)	15.1 (59.2)	15.3 (59.5)	15.0 (59.0)	14.2 (57.6)	14.1 (57.4)	14.8 (58.6)	15.5 (59.9)	16.4 (61.5)	17.0 (62.6)	16.4 (61.5)	15.3 (59.6)
Mean daily minimum °C (°F)	4.9 (40.8)	5.1 (41.2)	4.6 (40.3)	2.6 (36.7)	−0.6 (30.9)	−2.6 (27.3)	−3.0 (26.6)	−1.7 (28.9)	0.4 (32.7)	2.3 (36.1)	3.4 (38.1)	4.5 (40.1)	1.7 (35.0)
Average precipitation mm (inches)	164.6 (6.48)	136.4 (5.37)	110.3 (4.34)	41.3 (1.63)	10.1 (0.40)	4.8 (0.19)	7.2 (0.28)	12.6 (0.50)	22.6 (0.89)	36.3 (1.43)	39.4 (1.55)	95.8 (3.77)	681.4 (26.83)
Source: National Meteorology and Hydrology Service of Peru
