= Ilave River =

Tributary of Lake Titicaca, Peru

Coordinates: 15°59′59″S 69°26′39″W

Ilave River or Río Ilave is a stream in Peru, located in the Puno Region, on the Titicaca slope. It flows into Lake Titicaca.

It has an elevation of 3,815 metres.

Iiave River has a hydrographic basin that covers 7705 km^{2}. It has a length of 163 km.

Río Ilave is situated nearby the localities Jullani and Huayllata.

When it overflow, it effects massive hectares of crops. In recent years (2016-2023), its contamination has become an environmental challenge, in addition to health issue.

== See also ==
- Ilave
