= Panti Usu =

Mountain in Peru

- Location within Peru

Highest point
- Elevation: 5,500 m (18,000 ft)
- Coordinates: 16°58′15″S 70°7′12″W

Geography
- Location: Peru, Puno Region, El Collao Province, Tacna Region, Candarave Province
- Parent range: Andes

Panti Usu (Aymara panti a type of flower, usu illness, Hispanicized spelling Pantiuso) is a mountain in the Andes of southern Peru, about 5,500 metres (18,045 ft) high. It lies on a high ridge southeast of Lake Wisk'acha and southwest of the lake Lurisquta. Panti Usu is situated in the Puno Region, El Collao Province, Santa Rosa District, and in the Tacna Region, Candarave Province, Candarave District.
