= El Collao province =

Coordinates: 16.085278°S 69.637041°W

El Collao Qullaw
- Province
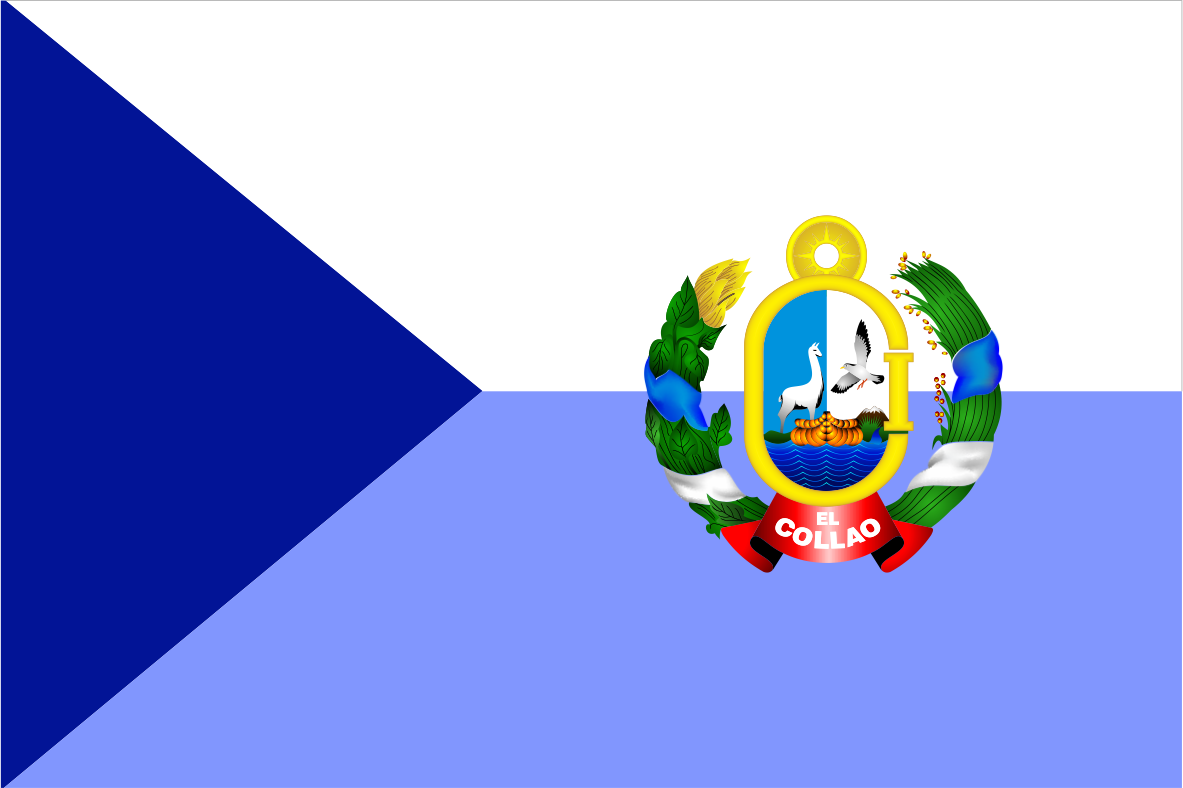
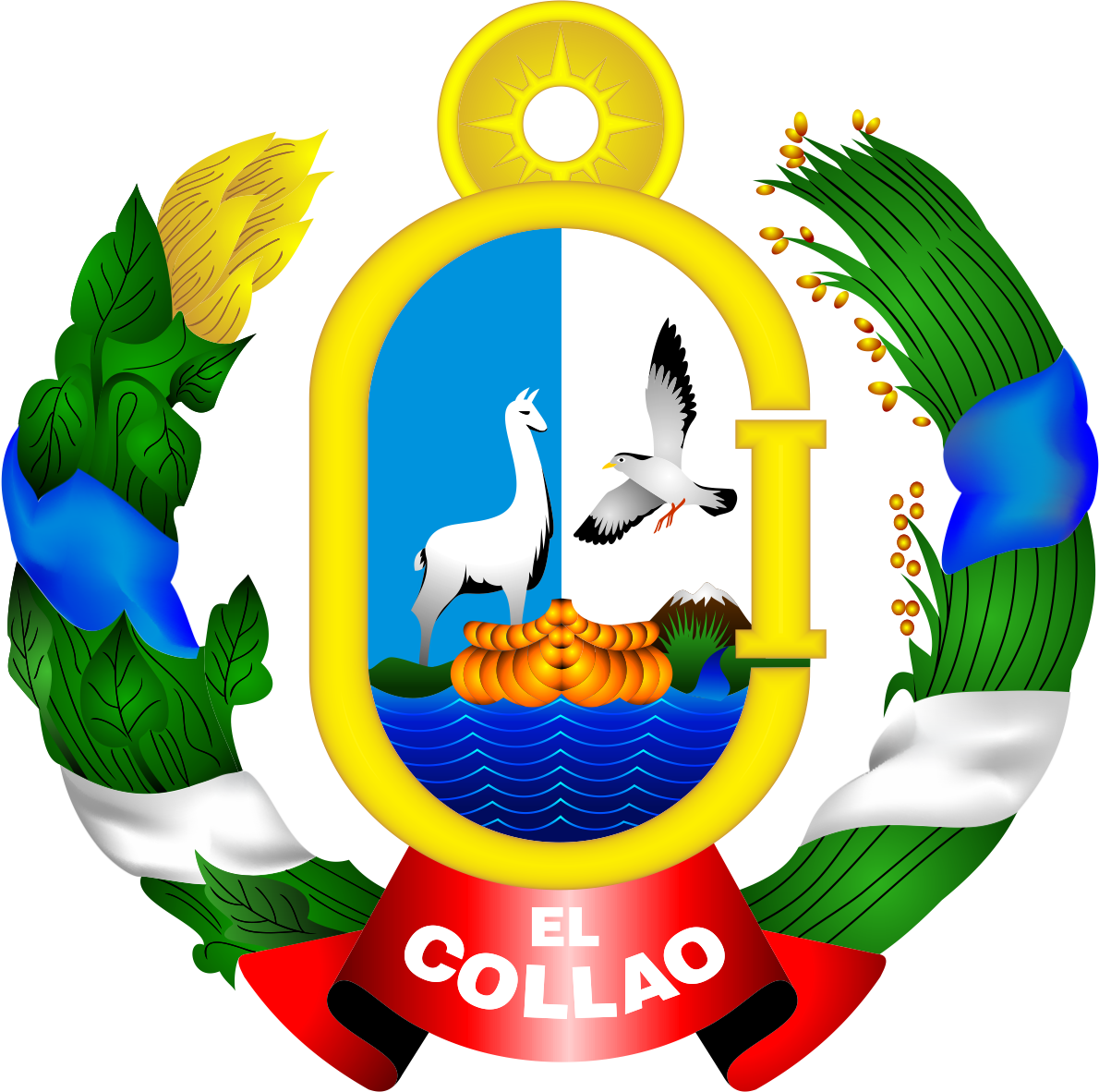
- Flag Coat of arms

- Location of El Collao in the Puno Region
- Country: Peru
- Region: Puno
- Founded: 1992
- Capital: Ilave

Area
  - Total: 5,600.51 km^{2} (2,162.37 sq mi)

Population
  - Total: 76,749
  - Density: 13.704/km^{2} (35.493/sq mi)
- UBIGEO: 2105

El Collao is a province of the Puno Region in Peru, created in 1992. The capital of the province is the city of Ilave.

== Political division ==
The province measures 5,600.51 square kilometres (2,162.37 sq mi) and is divided into five districts:

District	Mayor	Capital	Ubigeo
Capazo	Eulario Modesto Mayta Ccollo	Capazo	210502
Conduriri	Pedro Montalico Quenta	Conduriri	210505
Ilave	Fortunato Calli Incacutipa	Ilave	210501
Pilcuyo	Isidro Lupaca Ticona	Pilcuyo	210503
Santa Rosa	Ismael Acero Mamani	Mazocruz	210504

== Geography ==
Some of the highest peaks of the province are Panti Usu and Suri. Other mountains are listed below:

- Arichuwa
- Atapalluni
- Chuqi Luk'anani
- Chuqi Quta
- Chuqu Chuquni
- Chuta Kunka
- Ch'iyar Jaqhi
- Illimani
- Jach'a K'uchu
- Janq'u Qachi
- Janq'u Q'awa
- Jisk'a Larqanku
- Jisk'a Mawruma
- Jiwaña
- Kuntur Wawachawi
- K'awchini
- Laramani
- Larqanku
- Llallawa
- Llust'a K'uchu
- Mawruma
- Milluma
- Parwayuni
- Pata Jaqhi
- Phaq'u Q'awa
- Qallu Larqanku
- Qarwa P'iq'iña
- Qiwña Milluku
- Qiwña Mulluq'u
- Q'ulini
- Sukata Laq'a
- Sura Wiqu
- Tanka
- Tanka Tankani
- Titi Uta
- Tuma Tumani
- Uma Jalsu
- Waka P'iq'iña
- Wanqani
- Wanq'uri
- Warawarani
- Wari Kunka
- Wila Chunkara
- Wila Kunka
- Wila Purakani
- Wilantani
- Wiluyu

== Ethnic groups ==
The people in the province are mainly indigenous citizens of Aymara descent. Aymara is the language which the majority of the population (76.51%) learnt to speak in childhood, 22.57% of the residents started speaking using the Spanish language and 0.65% using Quechua (2007 Peru Census).

== See also ==
- Lurisquta
- Qillqatani
- Q'axilu
