= Lake Loriscota =

Lake in Peru

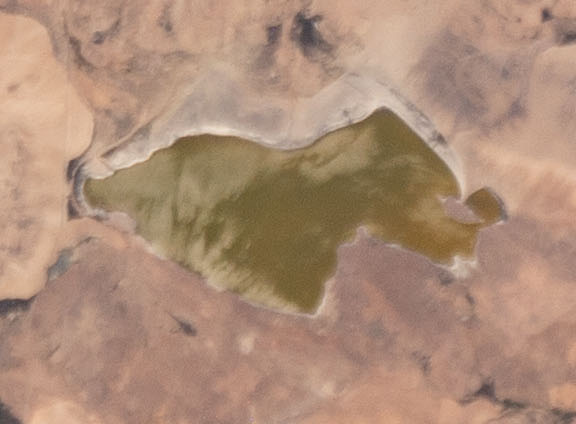
- Lake Loriscota seen from the ISS

- Location within Peru
- Location: Puno Region
- Coordinates: 16.866667°S 70.033333°W
- Basin countries: Peru

Lake Loriscota or Lake Lorisccota (possibly from Aymara lurisa inflorescence of the totora, name of a river (Loriza) connected with the lake and of a village (Loriza) northeast of the lake, quta lake,) is a lake in Peru. It is situated in the Puno Region, El Collao Province, Santa Rosa District.

== See also ==
- List of lakes in Peru
