= Yunkani =

Mountain in Peru

- Location within Peru

Highest point
- Elevation: 4,943 m (16,217 ft)
- Coordinates: 16°51′38″S 70°14′41″W

Geography
- Location: Peru, Moquegua Region, Tacna Region
- Parent range: Andes

Yunkani (Aymara yunka warm or temperate Andes or earth, -ni a suffix to indicate ownership, 'the one with a warm valley', Hispanicized spelling Yuncane) is a 4,943-metre-high (16,217 ft) mountain in the Andes of southern Peru. It is situated in the Moquegua Region, Mariscal Nieto Province, Carumas District, and in the Tacna Region, Candarave Province, Candarave District. Yunkani lies southwest of the mountain Paxsi Awki and northwest of the mountain Wisk'acha and Wisk'acha Lake.
