= Qupa Phuju =

Mountain in Peru

- Location within Peru

Highest point
- Elevation: 5,400 m (17,700 ft)
- Coordinates: 16°55′17″S 70°08′54″W

Geography
- Location: Peru, Moquegua Region, Tacna Region
- Parent range: Andes

Qupa Phuju (Aymara qupa green, phuju spring of water, "green spring", Hispanicized spelling Copapujo) is a 5,400-metre-high (17,717 ft) mountain in the Andes of southern Peru. It is located in the Moquegua Region, Mariscal Nieto Province, Carumas District, and in the Tacna Region, Candarave Province, Candarave District. Qupa Phuju lies southwest of the lake Lurisquta, southeast of Wisk'acha Lake and the mountain Wisk'acha and east of Iru Uma.
