= Wila Wilani (Moquegua-Tacna) =

Mountain in Peru

- Ch'ankha Qullu
- Location within Peru

Highest point
- Elevation: 4,900 m (16,100 ft)
- Coordinates: 16°46′29″S 70°15′54″W

Geography
- Location: Peru, Moquegua Region, Tacna Region
- Parent range: Andes

Wila Wilani (Aymara wila 'blood, blood-red'; the reduplication indicates a group or a complex of something, 'the one with a complex of red color', Hispanicized and possibly erroneous spellings Velaveiane, Velarelane) or Ch'ankha Qullu ('wool cord mountain', Chancacollo) is a mountain in the Andes of southern Peru, about 4,900 metres (16,076 ft) high. It is located in the Moquegua Region, Mariscal Nieto Province, Carumas District, and in the Tacna Region, Candarave Province, Candarave District. It lies west of a lake named Aqhuya Ch'alla (Ajuachaya, Pasto Grande), northwest of Paxsi Awki and east of Churi Laq'a, Ch'alluma and Ch'ankhani.
