= Waytiri =

Mountain in Peru

- Location within Peru

Highest point
- Elevation: 5,000 m (16,000 ft)
- Coordinates: 16°49′48″S 70°24′29″W

Geography
- Location: Peru, Moquegua Region, Tacna Region
- Parent range: Andes

Waytiri (Aymara, possibly composed of wayta flower, -iri a suffix, Hispanicized spelling Huaitire, Huaytire) is a mountain in the Andes of southern Peru, about 5,000 metres (16,404 ft) high. It is situated in the Moquegua Region, Mariscal Nieto Province, Carumas District, and in the Tacna Region, Candarave Province, Candarave District. Waytiri lies northeast of the mountain Warintapani.

Waytiri (Huaitire) is also the name of a river near the mountain. Along the village of Waytiri (Huaitire, Huaytiri) it flows to Such'i Lake (Waytiri Lake) in the south.

== See also ==
- Churi Laq'a
- Ch'alluma
