= Zuripujo =

Mountain in Peru

- Location within Peru

Highest point
- Elevation: 5,095 m (16,716 ft)
- Coordinates: 17°02′20″S 70°20′54″W

Geography
- Location: Peru, Tacna Region
- Parent range: Andes

Zuripujo (possibly from Aymara suri rhea, phuju spring of water, "rhea spring") is a 5,095-metre-high (16,716 ft) mountain in the Andes of southern Peru. It is situated in the Tacna Region, Candarave Province, Candarave District. It is southeast of the Tutupaca volcano.

Zuripujo is also the name of an intermittent stream which originates north of the mountain. It flows to the east.
