= Choreveco (Tacna) =

Mountain in Peru

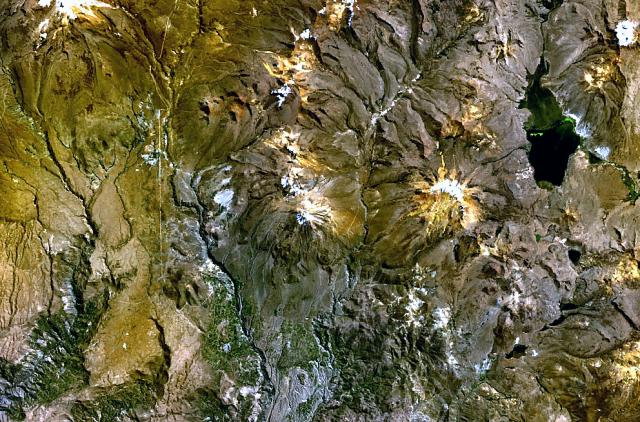
- The volcano Yucamane (center), Chiarjaque (the first snow-covered peak north of it above the river valley), the lake Vilacota and Choreveco (west of the lake) as seen from above (NASA Landsat7 image)

Highest point
- Elevation: 5,000 m (16,000 ft)
- Coordinates: 17°7′33″S 70°5′50″W

Geography
- Location within Peru
- Location: Peru, Tacna Region, Candarave Province, Tarata Province
- Parent range: Andes

Choreveco (possibly from Aymara churi dull yellow, wiqu a corner in a house, a mountain cove) is a mountain in the Andes of southern Peru, about 5,000 metres (16,404 ft) high. It is located in the Tacna Region, Candarave Province, Candarave District, and in the Tarata Province, Susapaya District. Choreveco lies northeast of the volcano Yucamane. It is situated between the mountain Chiarjaque in the west and the lake Vilacota in the east.
