= K'ara K'ara =

Mountain in Peru

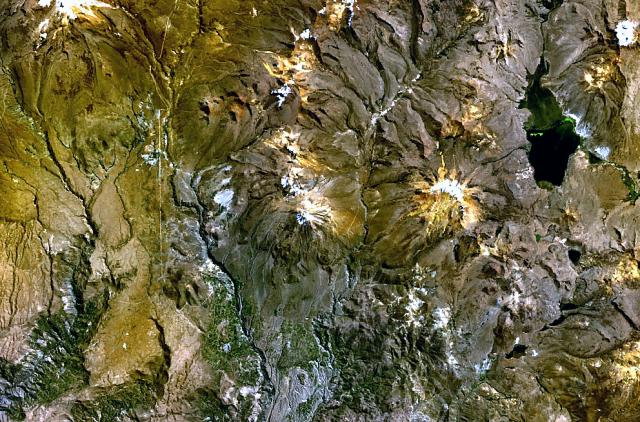
- The Yukamani volcano (center) and K'ara K'ara (upper center) as seen from above (NASA Landsat7 image)

Highest point
- Elevation: 5,200 m (17,100 ft)
- Coordinates: 17°02′47″S 70°09′14″W

Geography
- Location within Peru
- Location: Peru, Puno Region, El Collao Province, Tacna Region, Candarave Province
- Parent range: Andes

K'ara K'ara (Aymara for crest, Hispanicized spelling Caracara) is a mountain in the Andes of southern Peru, about 5,200 m (17,100 ft) high . It is located in the Tacna Region, Candarave Province, Candarave District. K'ara K'ara lies southwest of K'ank'awi.

K'ara K'ara is also the name of an intermittent stream which originates west of the mountain. It flows to the west.
