= Ichocollo (Tacna) =

Mountain in Peru

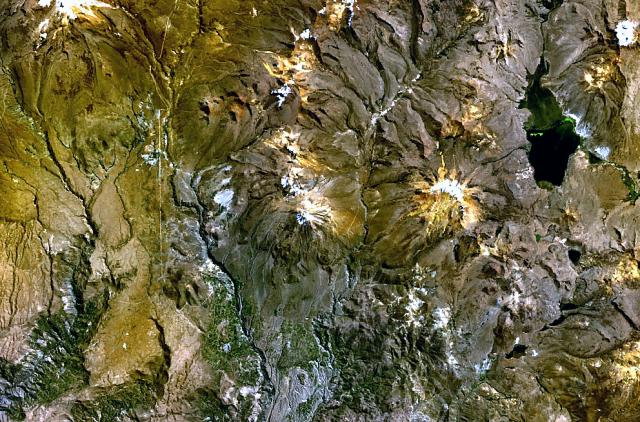
- The lake named Vilacota (on the right) and Ichocollo southwest of it as seen from above (NASA Landsat7 image)

Highest point
- Elevation: 4,400 m (14,400 ft)
- Coordinates: 17°14′14″S 70°06′54″W

Geography
- Location within Peru
- Location: Peru, Tacna Region, Candarave Province, Tarata Province
- Parent range: Andes

Ichocollo (possibly from Aymara jichu ichu, Peruvian feather grass, qullu mountain, "ichu mountain") is a mountain in the Andes of southern Peru which reaches a height of approximately 4,400 m (14,400 ft). It is located in the Tacna Region, Candarave Province, Candarave District, and in the Tarata Province, Susapaya District. Ichocollo lies southwest of Chillihua.
