= Wariri =

Mountain in Peru

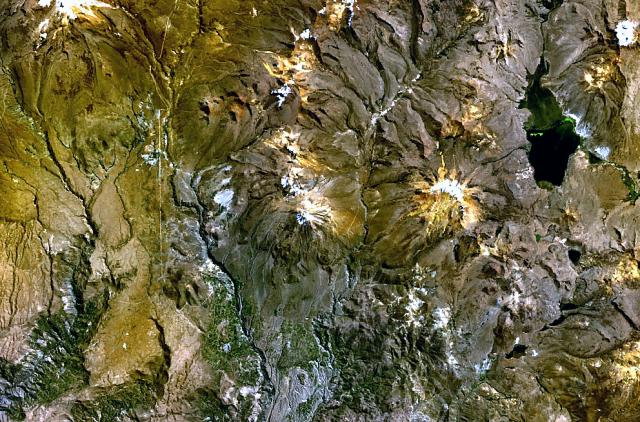
- The lake Wilaquta (on the right) and Wariri south of it as seen from above (NASA Landsat7 image)

Highest point
- Elevation: 4,800 m (15,700 ft)
- Coordinates: 17°10′55″S 70°01′25″W

Geography
- Location within Peru
- Location: Peru, Tacna Region, Tarata Province
- Parent range: Andes

Wariri (Aymara wari vicuña, -(i)ri a suffix, Hispanicized spelling Huarire, also Huairire) is a mountain in the Andes of southern Peru, about 4,800 metres (15,748 ft) high. It is located in the Tacna Region, Tarata Province, Susapaya District. Wariri lies between the lake Wilaquta in the north and Ñiq'i Quta ("mud lake") in the south.

== See also ==
- Churi Qullu
