= Candarave (disambiguation) =

Candarave may refer to several places:

- Candarave, a city in southern Peru
- Candarave District, a district in the Candarave Province
- Candarave Province, a province in the Tacna Region of Peru
