= Nasa Parqu =

Mountain in Peru

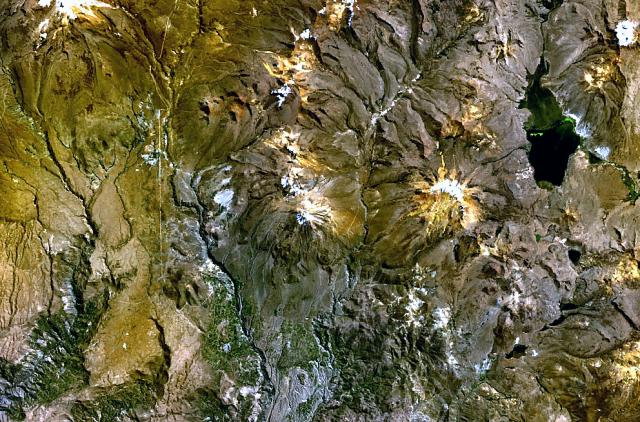
- The volcano Yukamani (center) and Nasa Parqu northwest of it as seen from above (NASA Landsat7 image)

Highest point
- Elevation: 4,939 m (16,204 ft)
- Coordinates: 17°06′57″S 70°15′45″W

Geography
- Location within Peru
- Location: Peru, Tacna Region, Candarave Province
- Parent range: Andes

Nasa Parqu (Aymara nasa nose, parqu something twisted, "twisted nose", Hispanicized spelling Nazaparco) is a 4,939-metre-high (16,204 ft) mountain in the Andes of southern Peru. It is situated in the Tacna Region, Candarave Province, Candarave District. Nasa Parqu lies northwest of the volcano Yukamani and southwest of the mountain Ch'iyar Jaqhi.
