= Titini =

Mountain in Peru

- Location within Peru

Highest point
- Elevation: 4,800 m (15,700 ft)
- Coordinates: 16°56′00″S 70°27′22″W

Geography
- Location: Peru, Moquegua Region, Tacna Region
- Parent range: Andes

Titini (Aymara titi Andean mountain cat; lead, -ni a suffix to indicate ownership, "the one with the Andean cat" or "the one with lead", also spelled Titine) is a mountain in the Andes of southern Peru, about 4,800 metres (15,748 ft) high. It is located in the Moquegua Region, Mariscal Nieto Province, Carumas District, and in the Tacna Region, Candarave Province, Candarave District. Titini is situated south of the mountains Warintapani, Arichuwa, Puma and Misa Qalani which all lie on the border of the two regions.
