= Lake Paracota (Tarata) =

Lake in Peru

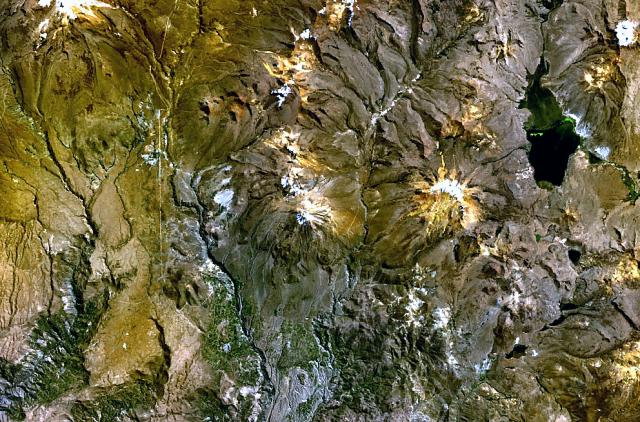
- Lake Vilacota, the large lake on the right as seen from above, and Lake Paracota south of it (NASA Landsat7 image)

- Location within Peru
- Location: Peru; Tacna Region
- Coordinates: 17°11′48″S 70°02′45″W
- Surface elevation: 4,522 m (14,836 ft)

Lake Paracota (possibly from Aymara phara dry, quta lake, "dry lake") is a lake in Peru located in the Tacna Region, Tarata Province, Susapaya District. It is situated at a height of about 4,522 metres (14,836 ft). Paracota lies south of the larger Lake Vilacota.
