= Sallajaque =

Mountain in Peru

- Location within Peru

Highest point
- Elevation: 5,180.1 m (16,995 ft)
- Coordinates: 16°59′40″S 70°25′36″W

Geography
- Location: Peru, Tacna Region, Candarave Province
- Parent range: Andes

Sallajaque (possibly from Aymara salla rock, cliff, jaqhi cliff, "rock cliff") is a mountain in the Andes of southern Peru, about 5,180.1 metres (16,995 ft) high. It is situated in the Tacna Region, Candarave Province, on the border of the districts Camilaca and Candarave. Sallajaque lies south-west of the volcano Tutupaca and west of the mountain Huilacollo.
