= Camilaca District =

Coordinates: 17.2684°S 70.3803°W

Camilaca
- District
- Interactive map of Camilaca
- Country: Peru
- Region: Tacna
- Province: Candarave
- Founded: September 6, 1988
- Capital: Camilaca

Government
  - Mayor: Ramon Paulino Esquia Flores

Area
  - Total: 518.65 km^{2} (200.25 sq mi)
- Elevation: 3,350 m (10,990 ft)

Population (2005 census)
  - Total: 1,896
  - Density: 3.656/km^{2} (9.468/sq mi)
- Time zone: UTC-5 (PET)
- UBIGEO: 230203

Camilaca District is one of six districts of the province Candarave in Peru.

== Geography ==
The highest mountain in the district is the Tutupaka volcano at 5,815 m (19,078 ft). Other mountains are listed below:

- Apachita Limani
- Chinchillani
- Chuqi Ananta
- Ch'alla Q'awa
- Jichu Qullu
- Kuntur Ikiña
- Limani
- Salla Jaqhi
- Taypi Sirka
- Tutupaka (Moquegua-Tacna)
- Wañuma
- Wila Qullu
