= Iru Uma =

Mountain in Peru

- Location within Peru

Highest point
- Elevation: 5,055 m (16,585 ft)
- Coordinates: 16°55′30″S 70°10′52″W

Geography
- Location: Peru, Moquegua Region, Tacna Region
- Parent range: Andes

Iru Uma (Aymara iru spiny Peruvian feather grass, uma water, 'feather grass water', Hispanicized spelling Irohuma, Irouma) is a 5,055-metre-high (16,585 ft) mountain in the Andes of southern Peru. It is situated in the Moquegua Region, Mariscal Nieto Province, Carumas District, and in the Tacna Region, Candarave Province, Candarave District. Iru Uma lies southeast of Wisk'acha Lake and southwest of the mountain Wisk'acha.
