= Lake Paracota (Candarave) =

Lake in Peru

Lake Paracota (Parinacota)
- Laguna Parinacota
- Parincota (Spanish)
- Location within Peru
- Location: Peru; Tacna Region
- Coordinates: 16°53′52″S 70°30′24″W

Lake Paracota (possibly from Aymara phara dry, quta lake) or Laguna Parinacota is a lake in Peru located in the Tacna Region, Candarave Province, Candarave District. It is situated at a height of about 4,512 metres (14,803 ft). Lake Paracota lies between the larger Lake Suches in the northwest and the volcano Tutupaca in the south.
