= Huilacollo (Tacna) =

Mountain in Peru

- Location within Peru

Highest point
- Elevation: 5,000 m (16,000 ft)
- Coordinates: 16°59′30″S 70°23′55″W

Geography
- Location: Peru, Tacna Region, Candarave Province
- Parent range: Andes

Huilacollo (possibly from Aymara wila blood, blood-red, qullu mountain, "red mountain") is a mountain in the Andes of southern Peru which reaches a height of approximately 5,000 m (16,000 ft). It is located in the Tacna Region, Candarave Province, on the border of the districts of Camilaca and Candarave. Huilacollo lies southwest of the Tutupaca volcano and east of Sallajaque.
