= Huanuara District =

Coordinates: 17.3136°S 70.3222°W

Huanuara
- District
- Interactive map of Huanuara
- Country: Peru
- Region: Tacna
- Province: Candarave
- Founded: January 5, 1945
- Capital: Huanuara

Government
  - Mayor: Josue Angel Rios Calizaya

Area
  - Total: 95.61 km^{2} (36.92 sq mi)
- Elevation: 3,250 m (10,660 ft)

Population (2005 census)
  - Total: 735
  - Density: 7.69/km^{2} (19.9/sq mi)
- Time zone: UTC-5 (PET)
- UBIGEO: 230205

Huanuara District is one of six districts of the Candarave Province in the Tacna Region in Peru.
