= Sasawini =

Mountain in Peru

- Location within Peru

Highest point
- Elevation: 5,000 m (16,000 ft)
- Coordinates: 16°57′30″S 70°20′34″W

Geography
- Location: Peru, Tacna Region
- Parent range: Andes

Sasawini (sasawi (hispaniziced spelling sasahui) local name for Leucheria daucifolia, -ni an Aymara suffix to indicate ownership, "the one with the sasawi", hispanicized spellings Sasahuine, Sasahuini) is a mountain in the Andes of southern Peru, about 5,000 m (16,000 ft) high. It is located in the Tacna Region, Candarave Province, Candarave District. It lies southeast of a lake named Such'i (Suches). Jichu Qullu is south of it.
