= Susapaya District =

Coordinates: 17.3532°S 70.1327°W

Susapaya
- District
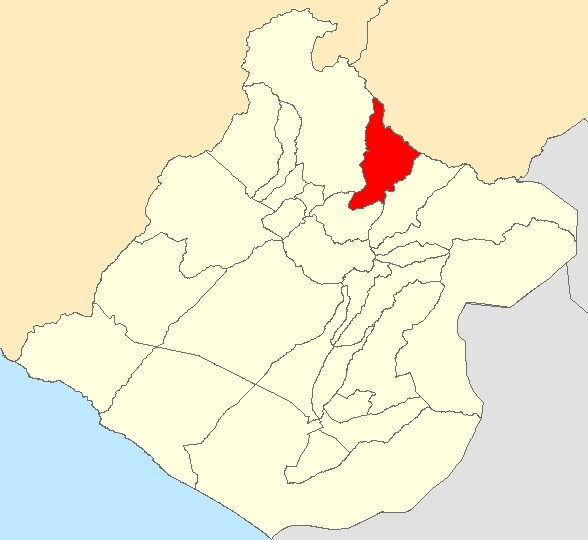
- Map of the Tacna regions with the Susapaya district highlighted in red
- Interactive map of Susapaya
- Country: Peru
- Region: Tacna
- Province: Tarata
- Founded: October 26, 1954
- Capital: Susapaya

Government
  - Mayor: Raul Rufo Cutipa Cruz

Area
  - Total: 373.21 km^{2} (144.10 sq mi)
- Elevation: 3,390 m (11,120 ft)

Population (2005 census)
  - Total: 747
  - Density: 2.00/km^{2} (5.18/sq mi)
- Time zone: UTC-5 (PET)
- UBIGEO: 230406

Susapaya District is one of eight districts of the province Tarata in Peru.

== Geography ==
Some of the highest mountains of the district are listed below:

- Chunkarani
- Churi Nasa
- Churi Qullu
- Churi Wiqu
- Ch'illiwa
- Jach'a T'aja Sirka
- Janq'u Laq'a
- Janq'u Qullu
- Jaruma
- Jichu Qullu
- Lluqu Lluquni
- Ñuñun Qala
- Q'ipinaña
- Taypi Qullu
- Wañuma
- Wariri
- Yana K'achi
- Yarita Pampa

== Climate ==
Climate data for Susapaya, elevation 3,468 m (11,378 ft), (1991–2020)
Month	Jan	Feb	Mar	Apr	May	Jun	Jul	Aug	Sep	Oct	Nov	Dec	Year
Mean daily maximum °C (°F)	17.3 (63.1)	16.8 (62.2)	17.2 (63.0)	17.6 (63.7)	17.3 (63.1)	17.0 (62.6)	16.9 (62.4)	17.3 (63.1)	17.7 (63.9)	18.0 (64.4)	18.3 (64.9)	17.8 (64.0)	17.4 (63.4)
Mean daily minimum °C (°F)	5.6 (42.1)	5.8 (42.4)	5.3 (41.5)	4.5 (40.1)	3.3 (37.9)	2.7 (36.9)	2.3 (36.1)	3.2 (37.8)	4.0 (39.2)	4.0 (39.2)	4.1 (39.4)	4.9 (40.8)	4.1 (39.4)
Average precipitation mm (inches)	71.6 (2.82)	85.4 (3.36)	34.2 (1.35)	1.7 (0.07)	0.7 (0.03)	0.7 (0.03)	1.8 (0.07)	1.3 (0.05)	1.7 (0.07)	0.6 (0.02)	0.7 (0.03)	14.0 (0.55)	214.4 (8.45)
Source: National Meteorology and Hydrology Service of Peru

Climate data for Lake Vilacota, Susapaya, elevation 4,390 m (14,400 ft), (1991–2020)
Month	Jan	Feb	Mar	Apr	May	Jun	Jul	Aug	Sep	Oct	Nov	Dec	Year
Mean daily maximum °C (°F)	12.6 (54.7)	12.5 (54.5)	12.9 (55.2)	12.8 (55.0)	11.8 (53.2)	11.3 (52.3)	10.8 (51.4)	11.9 (53.4)	12.9 (55.2)	14.1 (57.4)	14.8 (58.6)	14.3 (57.7)	12.7 (54.9)
Mean daily minimum °C (°F)	−3.5 (25.7)	−3.2 (26.2)	−4.3 (24.3)	−7.3 (18.9)	−11.3 (11.7)	−13.4 (7.9)	−13.5 (7.7)	−13.3 (8.1)	−10.9 (12.4)	−9.5 (14.9)	−8.2 (17.2)	−5.6 (21.9)	−8.7 (16.4)
Average precipitation mm (inches)	117.9 (4.64)	127.4 (5.02)	79.7 (3.14)	25.1 (0.99)	3.0 (0.12)	2.1 (0.08)	4.4 (0.17)	1.5 (0.06)	4.3 (0.17)	9.2 (0.36)	12.8 (0.50)	60.0 (2.36)	447.4 (17.61)
Source: National Meteorology and Hydrology Service of Peru

== See also ==
- Pharaquta
