= Candarave District =

District of Peru

Coordinates: 17.2682°S 70.2503°W

Candarave
- District
- Interactive map of Candarave
- Country: Peru
- Region: Tacna
- Province: Candarave
- Capital: Candarave

Government
  - Mayor: Mario Genaro Copa Conde

Area
  - Total: 1,111.03 km^{2} (428.97 sq mi)
- Elevation: 3,415 m (11,204 ft)

Population (2005 census)
  - Total: 3,430
  - Density: 3.09/km^{2} (8.00/sq mi)
- Time zone: UTC-5 (PET)
- UBIGEO: 230201

Candarave District is one of six districts of the province Candarave in Peru.

== Etymology ==
Peruvian linguist Rodolfo Cerrón-Palomino speculates that the name comes from kanta-ra-wi, an Aymara word meaning "place of many lodgings".

== Geography ==
Some of the highest mountains of the district are listed below:

- Arichuwa
- Chinchillani
- Churi Laq'a
- Churi Wiqu
- Ch'alluma
- Ch'ankhani
- Ch'iyar Jaqhi
- Iru Uma
- Jichu Pampa
- Jichu Qullu
- Jichurasi
- Jisk'a Larqanku
- Kuntur Ikiña
- K'ank'awi
- K'ara K'ara
- Larqanku
- Nasa Parqu
- Panti Usu
- Paxsi Awki
- Pichaqa
- Puma
- Phaq'u Qullu
- Phaq'u Q'awa
- Pharaquta
- Qina Mich'i
- Qupa Phuju
- Q'ara Qullu
- Salla Jaqhi
- Sasawini
- Suri Phuju
- Tankan
- Tarujani
- Taypi Sirka
- Titini
- Tutupaka
- Urqun Qullu
- Wanqani Wintu
- Wari Kunka
- Warintapani
- Watañani
- Waytiri
- Wila Qullu
- Wila Wilani
- Wisk'acha
- Yukamani
- Yunkani

== Climate ==
Climate data for Candarave, elevation 3,415 m (11,204 ft), (1991–2020)
Month	Jan	Feb	Mar	Apr	May	Jun	Jul	Aug	Sep	Oct	Nov	Dec	Year
Mean daily maximum °C (°F)	16.6 (61.9)	16.2 (61.2)	16.8 (62.2)	17.1 (62.8)	16.6 (61.9)	15.8 (60.4)	15.7 (60.3)	16.6 (61.9)	17.2 (63.0)	17.6 (63.7)	17.7 (63.9)	17.5 (63.5)	16.8 (62.2)
Mean daily minimum °C (°F)	4.9 (40.8)	5.1 (41.2)	4.8 (40.6)	3.7 (38.7)	2.2 (36.0)	1.1 (34.0)	1.0 (33.8)	2.0 (35.6)	2.9 (37.2)	3.2 (37.8)	3.3 (37.9)	4.1 (39.4)	3.2 (37.8)
Average precipitation mm (inches)	60.0 (2.36)	72.3 (2.85)	33.4 (1.31)	3.3 (0.13)	0.5 (0.02)	0.2 (0.01)	1.7 (0.07)	0.7 (0.03)	1.2 (0.05)	0.9 (0.04)	1.1 (0.04)	18.7 (0.74)	194 (7.65)
Source: National Meteorology and Hydrology Service of Peru

== See also ==
- Pharaquta
