= Arichuwa (disambiguation) =

Arichuwa (Aymara or Quechua for a kind of potatoes, Hispanicized spellings Arichoa, Arechua, Arichua) may refer to:

- Arichuwa, a mountain in the Puno Province, Puno Region, Peru
- Arichuwa (El Collao-Chucuito), a mountain on the border of the El Collao Province and the Chucuito Province, Puno Region, Peru
- Arichuwa (Moquegua), a mountain in the Mariscal Nieto Province, Moquegua Region, Peru
- Arichuwa (Moquegua-Tacna), a mountain on the border of the Moquegua Region and the Tacna Region, Peru
