= Curibaya District =

Coordinates: 17.3824°S 70.3354°W

Curibaya
- District
- Interactive map of Curibaya
- Country: Peru
- Region: Tacna
- Province: Candarave
- Founded: February 5, 1875
- Capital: Curibaya

Government
  - Mayor: Che Bardo Mamani Ayala

Area
  - Total: 126.98 km^{2} (49.03 sq mi)
- Elevation: 2,400 m (7,900 ft)

Population (2005 census)
  - Total: 249
  - Density: 1.96/km^{2} (5.08/sq mi)
- Time zone: UTC-5 (PET)
- UBIGEO: 230204

Curibaya District is one of six districts of the province Candarave in Peru.
