= Churi Qullu =

Mountain in Peru

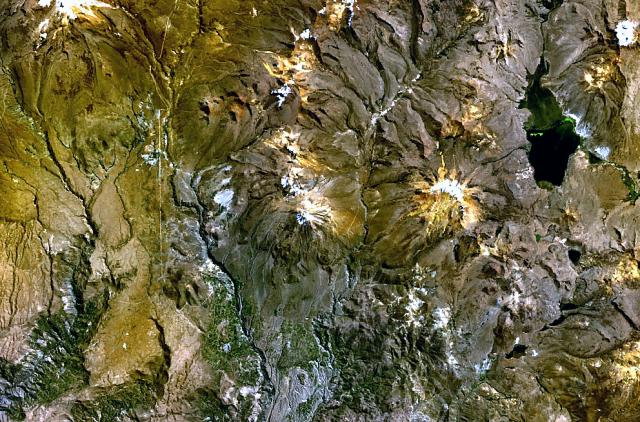
- The volcano Yukamani (center), the lake Wilaquta and Churi Qullu southeast of it as seen from above (NASA Landsat7 image)

Highest point
- Elevation: 4,800 m (15,700 ft)
- Coordinates: 17°12′31″S 69°59′01″W

Geography
- Location within Peru
- Location: Peru, Tacna Region, Tarata Province
- Parent range: Andes

Churi Qullu (Aymara churi dull yellow, qullu mountain, "dull yellow mountain", Hispanicized spelling Choreccollo, Chorecollo) is a mountain in the Andes of southern Peru, about 4,800 metres (15,748 ft) high. It is located in the Tacna Region, Tarata Province, Susapaya District. Churi Qullu lies northwest of P'isaqani and southeast of Wilaquta and Janq'u Qullu.
