= Quilahuani District =

Coordinates: 17.3180°S 70.2585°W

Quilahuani
- District
- Interactive map of Quilahuani
- Country: Peru
- Region: Tacna
- Province: Candarave
- Founded: February 15, 1955
- Capital: Quilahuani

Government
  - Mayor: Luis Cahuana Mamani

Area
  - Total: 37.66 km^{2} (14.54 sq mi)
- Elevation: 3,176 m (10,420 ft)

Population (2005 census)
  - Total: 918
  - Density: 24.4/km^{2} (63.1/sq mi)
- Time zone: UTC-5 (PET)
- UBIGEO: 230206

Quilahuani District is one of six districts of the province Candarave in Peru.

== Climate ==
Climate data for Aricota, Quilahuani, elevation 2,850 m (9,350 ft), (1991–2020)
Month	Jan	Feb	Mar	Apr	May	Jun	Jul	Aug	Sep	Oct	Nov	Dec	Year
Mean daily maximum °C (°F)	18.8 (65.8)	18.4 (65.1)	18.8 (65.8)	19.5 (67.1)	19.4 (66.9)	19.3 (66.7)	19.0 (66.2)	19.6 (67.3)	19.9 (67.8)	19.5 (67.1)	19.3 (66.7)	18.9 (66.0)	19.2 (66.5)
Mean daily minimum °C (°F)	7.6 (45.7)	8.0 (46.4)	6.7 (44.1)	4.6 (40.3)	2.9 (37.2)	2.3 (36.1)	2.1 (35.8)	2.5 (36.5)	3.7 (38.7)	3.9 (39.0)	4.5 (40.1)	6.2 (43.2)	4.6 (40.3)
Average precipitation mm (inches)	42.8 (1.69)	44.6 (1.76)	16.6 (0.65)	1.6 (0.06)	1.0 (0.04)	0.3 (0.01)	0.2 (0.01)	0.1 (0.00)	0.0 (0.0)	0.0 (0.0)	0.2 (0.01)	12.1 (0.48)	119.5 (4.71)
Source: National Meteorology and Hydrology Service of Peru
