= Chillihua =

Mountain in the Andes of southern Peru

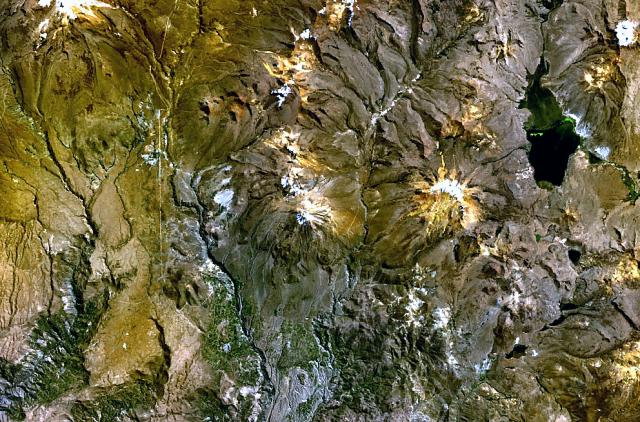
- The lake Lake Vilacota (on the right) and Chillihua southwest of it as seen from above (NASA Landsat7 image)

Highest point
- Elevation: 4,800 m (15,700 ft)
- Coordinates: 17°13′33″S 70°04′35″W

Geography
- Location within Peru
- Location: Peru, Tacna Region, Tarata Province
- Parent range: Andes

Chillihua (possibly from Aymara for a species of grass (Festuca dolichophylla)) is a mountain in the Andes of southern Peru, about 4,800 metres (15,748 ft) high. It is located in the Tacna Region, Tarata Province, Susapaya District. Chillihua lies southwest of the lakes Vilacota and Lake Neque ("mud lake").
