= Kollo =

Kollo may refer to:

== People ==
- Kollo Daniel Sanou (born 1951), Burkinabé film director
- Kristo Kollo (born 1990), Estonian volleyball player
- René Kollo (born 1937), German tenor
- Walter Kollo (1878–1940), German composer

== Places ==
- Churi Kollo or Churi Qullu, Peru
- Kollo, Guiaro, Burkina Faso
- Kollo, Lâ-Todin, Burkina Faso
- Kollo, Tiébélé, Burkina Faso
- Kollo, Cameroon
- Kollo, Niger
