= Qina Mich'i =

Mountain in Peru

- Location within Peru

Highest point
- Elevation: 5,030 m (16,500 ft)
- Coordinates: 16°53′30″S 70°24′52″W

Geography
- Location: Peru, Tacna Region
- Parent range: Andes

Qina Mich'i (Aymara qina, qina qina a musical instrument, mich'i bow, Hispanicized spellings Quenameche, Quinamichi) is a 5,030-metre-high (16,500 ft) mountain in the Andes of southern Peru. It is located in the Tacna Region, Candarave Province, Candarave District. Qina Mich'i lies north of Such'i Lake (Suches). Jichu Qullu is the name of the mountain southwest of it.
