= Miss Peru 2007 =

Due to the restructuring that carried out the Miss Peru Organization split in two one for Miss Peru Universe and another one for Miss World Peru.

Jimena Elías Roca, former Miss Teen Peru 2005 and represented Peru in the Miss Teen International that same year, where she placed as 1st runner-up, was elected Miss Peru Universe on April 16, 2007. She was handpicked by the Corporacion Nacional de la Belleza who was in charge of sending their delegate to Miss Universe and other minor pageants. On May 2, Elías traveled to compete in the Miss Universe 2007 in Mexico City, Mexico. Later Odilia Garcia was appointed to represent Peru in the Miss Earth 2007 in Philippines, when she reach a spot in the Top 8.

== Placements ==
Final Results	Contestant	Result International
Miss Peru Universe 2007	Ica - Jimena Elías Roca	I don't classify
Miss Earth Peru 2007	Junín - Odilia García	Top 8

== 2007 Pageant ==
The Miss Perú 2007 pageant was held on June 15, 2007. That year, 24 candidates were competing for the national crown. The chosen winner represented Peru in the Miss World 2007. The rest of the finalists would enter in different pageants.

Miss Peru 2007
- Date: June 15, 2007
- Presenters: Jorge Beleván & Kenita Larraín
- Venue: Estadio Mansiche
- Broadcaster: Andina de Televisión
- Entrants: 24
- Winner: Cynthia Calderón Ulloa; Tacna

== Placements ==
Final Results	Contestant	Result International
Miss World Perú 2007	Tacna - Cynthia Calderón Ulloa	I don't classify
Miss International Perú 2007	La Libertad - Luisa Fernanda Monteverde	I don't classify
1st runner-up	Arequipa - Jackeline Spoljaric	
Top 5	USA Perú - Melissa Huddleston; Europe Perú - Natalie Doering	
Top 10	Ucayali - Nicole Scekic Schuppli; Cuzco - Lizibel de las Casas; Huánuco - Sofía del Pinho; Ayacucho - Jessica Barrantes; Distrito Capital - Grecia De Martis	

== Special awards ==
- Best Regional Costume: La Libertad - Luisa Fernanda Monteverde
- Most Beautiful Face: Arequipa - Jackeline Spoljaric
- Best Hair: Loreto - Fresia Ortega
- Miss Congeniality: Ucayali - Nicole Scekic Schuppli
- Miss Silhouette: Lima - Grecia De Martis
- Miss Style: Huánuco - Sofía del Pinho
- Miss Smile: Cuzco - Lizibel de las Casas

== Delegates ==
- Amazonas - Grecia Solano
- Áncash - Rocío Carolina Guerrero
- Apurímac - Georgette Cárdenas
- Arequipa - Jackeline Spoljaric
- Ayacucho - Jessica Barrantes
- Cajamarca - Nona Abanto Velásquez
- Callao - Karla Flores
- Cuzco - Lizibel de las Casas
- Distrito Capital - Grecia De Martis
- Europe Perú - Natalie Doering
- Huancavelica - Patricia Ríos
- Huánuco - Sofía de Pinho
- Junín - Leslie Blanco
- La Libertad - Luisa Fernanda Monteverde
- Lambayeque - Luciana León Ferreyro
- Loreto - Fresia Ortega Pérez
- Madre de Dios - Ana Lucía García Urrutia
- Moquegua - Agatha Navarro
- Pasco - Alba Trece
- San Martín - Solange Paredes Díaz
- Tacna - Cinthia Calderón Ulloa
- Tumbes - Gabriela Vásquez
- Ucayali - Nicole Scekic Schuppli
- USA Perú - Melissa Huddleston

== Trivia ==
- Miss Piura, Kathia Aponte Camposano, withdrew Miss Peru 2007 pageant. She accusing the National Organization for Sexual Harassment and Racial Discrimination.

== Background Music ==
- Opening Number: Banda Santa Lucía de Moche - "La Concheperla"
- Special Guests Singer
  - Pepe Alva - "Matarina"
  - Fanny Lu - "No te pido Flores"
