= Cairani District =

Coordinates: 17.2852°S 70.3638°W

Cairani K'ayrani
- District
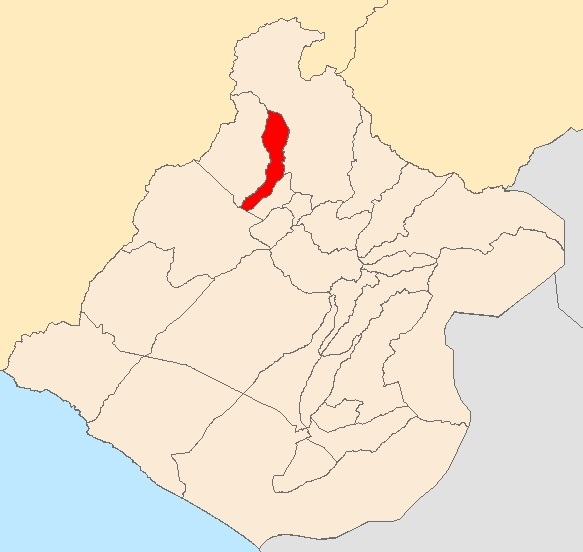
- distrito Cairani
- Interactive map of Cairani
- Country: Peru
- Region: Tacna
- Province: Candarave
- Founded: December 4, 1952
- Capital: Cairani

Government
  - Mayor: Tito Nina Curo

Area
  - Total: 371.17 km^{2} (143.31 sq mi)
- Elevation: 3,400 m (11,200 ft)

Population (2005 census)
  - Total: 1,315
  - Density: 3.543/km^{2} (9.176/sq mi)
- Time zone: UTC-5 (PET)
- UBIGEO: 230202

Cairani (Hispanicized spelling of Aymara K'ayrani, k'ayra frog, -ni a suffix, "the one with the frog (or frogs)") is one of six districts of the Candarave Province in Peru.

== Climate ==
Climate data for Cairani, elevation 3,386 m (11,109 ft), (1991–2020)
Month	Jan	Feb	Mar	Apr	May	Jun	Jul	Aug	Sep	Oct	Nov	Dec	Year
Mean daily maximum °C (°F)	15.6 (60.1)	15.4 (59.7)	16.0 (60.8)	16.5 (61.7)	16.6 (61.9)	16.4 (61.5)	16.1 (61.0)	16.4 (61.5)	16.4 (61.5)	16.6 (61.9)	16.5 (61.7)	16.1 (61.0)	16.2 (61.2)
Mean daily minimum °C (°F)	4.8 (40.6)	5.3 (41.5)	5.0 (41.0)	4.4 (39.9)	3.3 (37.9)	2.0 (35.6)	1.6 (34.9)	1.8 (35.2)	2.8 (37.0)	3.6 (38.5)	3.6 (38.5)	4.1 (39.4)	3.5 (38.3)
Average precipitation mm (inches)	42.7 (1.68)	45.1 (1.78)	20.1 (0.79)	2.1 (0.08)	0.7 (0.03)	0.4 (0.02)	1.1 (0.04)	0.5 (0.02)	1.1 (0.04)	0.2 (0.01)	0.3 (0.01)	10.2 (0.40)	124.5 (4.9)
Source: National Meteorology and Hydrology Service of Peru
