= Pacocollo =

Mountain in Peru

- Chancane
- Location within Peru

Highest point
- Elevation: 5,113 m (16,775 ft)
- Coordinates: 16°46′39″S 70°18′05″W

Geography
- Location: Peru, Moquegua Region, Tacna Region
- Parent range: Andes

Pacocollo also known as Chancane (possibly from Aymara ch'ankha wool cord, -ni a suffix to indicate ownership, "the one with a cord"), is a 5,113-metre-high (16,775 ft) mountain in the Andes of southern Peru. It is located in the Moquegua Region, Mariscal Nieto Province, Carumas District, and in the Tacna Region, Candarave Province, Candarave District. Pacocollo lies west of a lake named Pasto Grande or Ajuachaya and Wila Wilani.
