= Vizcachas (mountain) =

Mountain in Peru

- Location within Peru

Highest point
- Elevation: 5,354 m (17,566 ft)
- Coordinates: 16°54′47″S 70°10′28″W

Geography
- Location: Peru, Moquegua Region, Mariscal Nieto Province, Tacna Region, Candarave Province
- Parent range: Andes

Vizcachas (Aymara and Quechua for viscacha, Hispanicized spelling Vizcachas) is a 5,354-metre-high (17,566 ft) mountain in the Andes of southern Peru. It is situated in the Moquegua Region, Mariscal Nieto Province, Carumas District, and in the Tacna Region, Candarave Province, Candarave District. The mountain lies south-east of Vizcachas Lake.

== See also ==
- Panti Usu
- Paxsi Awki
