= Arichua (Moquegua-Tacna) =

Mountain in Peru

- Location within Peru

Highest point
- Elevation: 4,800 m (15,700 ft)
- Coordinates: 16°51′56″S 70°27′03″W

Geography
- Location: Peru, Moquegua Region, Tacna Region
- Parent range: Andes

Arichua (possibly from Aymara or Quechua for a kind of potatoes) is a mountain in the Andes of southern Peru, about 4,800 metres (15,748 ft) high. It is situated in the Moquegua Region, Mariscal Nieto Province, Carumas District, and in the Tacna Region, Candarave Province, Candarave District. Arichua lies southwest of the mountain Huarintapaña.
