= Warintapani =

Mountain in Peru

- Location within Peru

Highest point
- Elevation: 5,060 m (16,600 ft)
- Coordinates: 16°50′24″S 70°26′5″W

Geography
- Location: Peru, Moquegua Region, Mariscal Nieto Province, Tacna Region, Candarave Province
- Parent range: Andes

Warintapani (Aymara, possibly composed of wari vicuña, tapa nest, -n, -ni suffixes, "the one with a nest of a vicuña", Hispanicized names Huarintapaña, Huarintapani, Hurintapaña) is a 5,060-metre-high (16,601 ft) mountain in the Andes of southern Peru. It is situated in the Moquegua Region, Mariscal Nieto Province, Carumas District, and in the Tacna Region, Candarave Province, Candarave District.

== See also ==
- Churi Laq'a
- Ch'alluma
