= Chiarjaque =

Mountain in Peru

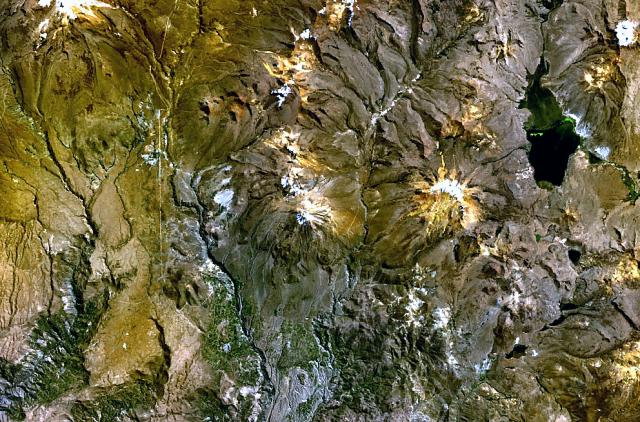
- The volcano Yucamane (center), Chiarjaque (the first snow-covered peak north of it above the river valley) and Lake Vilacota (on the right) as seen from above (NASA Landsat7 image)

Highest point
- Elevation: 5,300 m (17,400 ft)
- Coordinates: 17°6′32″S 70°12′46″W

Geography
- Location within Peru
- Location: Peru, Tacna Region, Candarave Province
- Parent range: Andes

Chiarjaque (possibly from Aymara ch'iyara black, jaqhi precipice, cliff) is a mountain in the Andes of southern Peru, about 5,300 metres (17,388 ft) high. It is in the Tacna Region, Candarave Province, Candarave District. Chiarjaque is north of Yucamane volcano.
