= K'ank'awi =

Mountain in Peru

- Location within Peru

Highest point
- Elevation: 5,300 m (17,400 ft)
- Coordinates: 17°01′40″S 70°08′25″W

Geography
- Location: Peru, Puno Region, El Collao Province, Tacna Region, Candarave Province
- Parent range: Andes

K'ank'awi (Aymara k'ank'a opening, gap; crevice, -wi a nominalizing suffix to indicate a place, "a place of crevices", Hispanicized spelling Cancave) is a mountain in the Andes of southern Peru, about 5,300 m (17,400 ft) high . It is located in the Tacna Region, Candarave Province, Candarave District. K'ank'awi lies southwest of Larqanku and Jisk'a Larqanku.
