= Candarave province =

Province of Peru

Coordinates: 17.270150°S 70.251625°W

Candarave
- Province
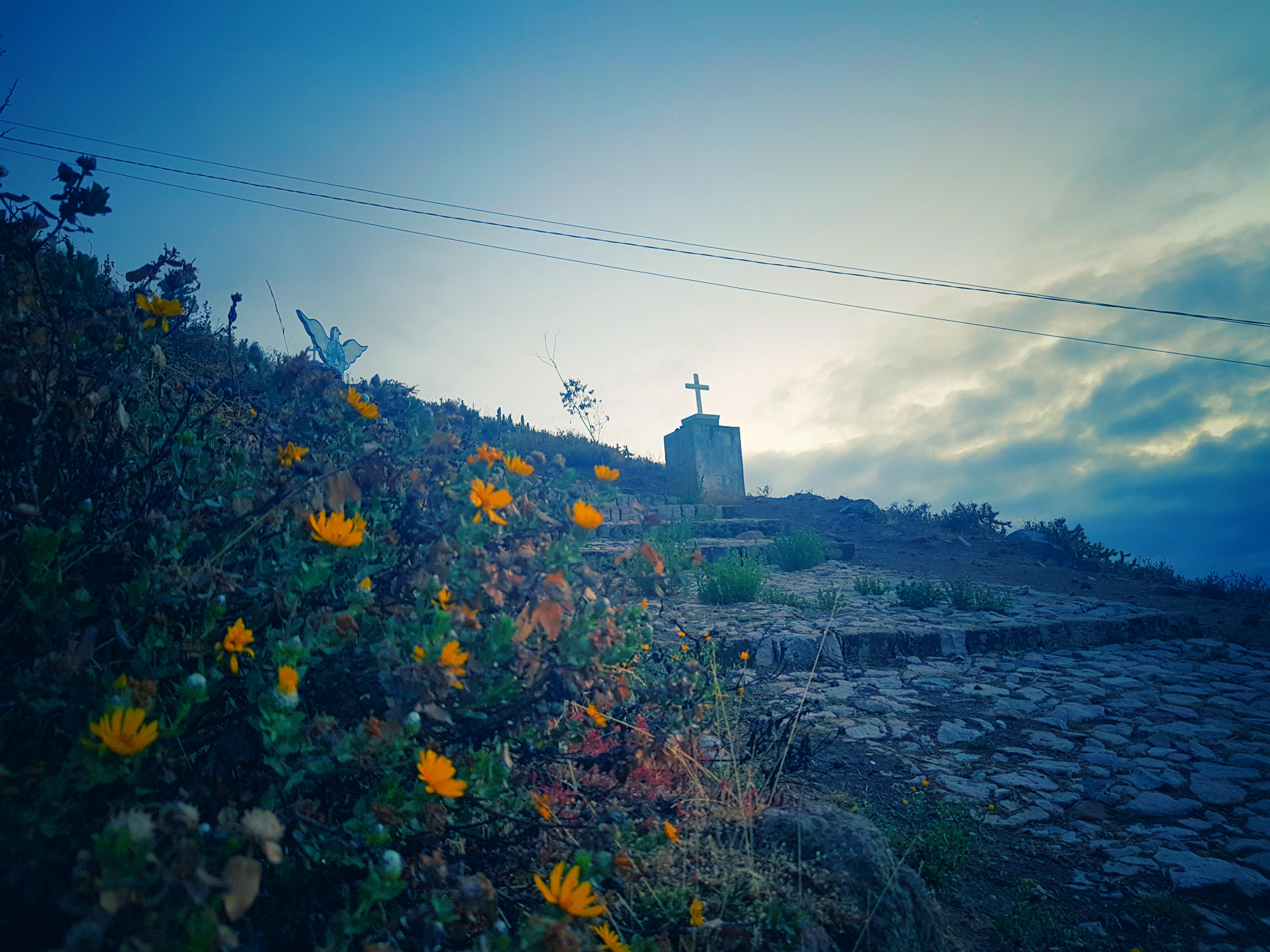
- Viewpoint in Candarave

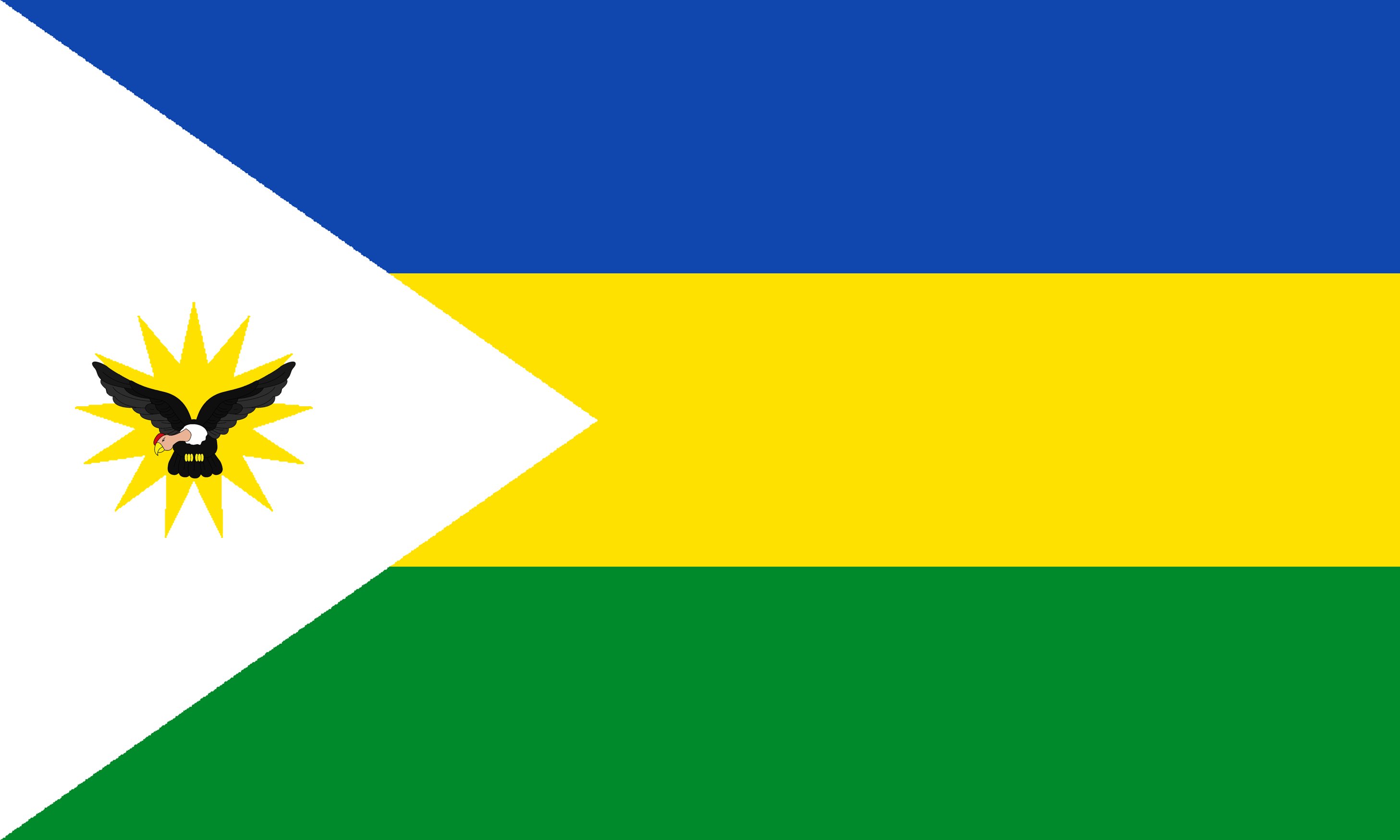
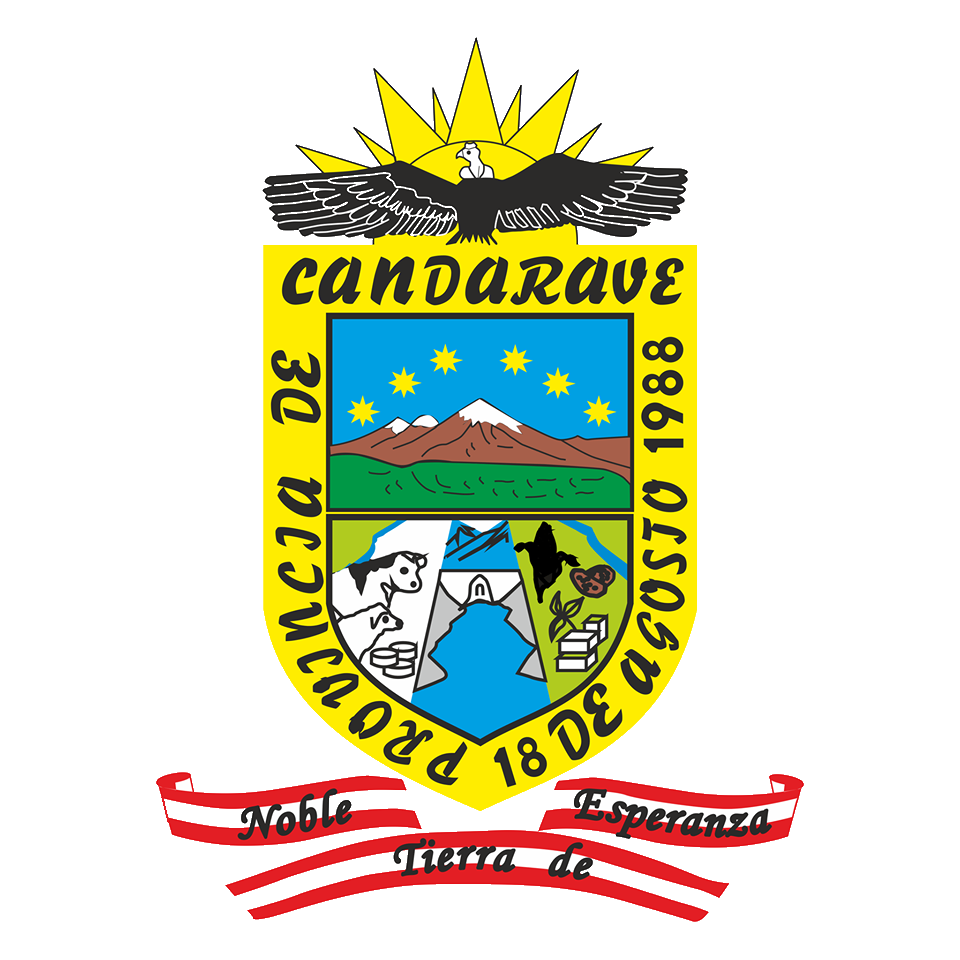
- Flag Coat of arms

- Location of Candarave in Peru
- Country: Peru
- Department: Tacna
- Founded: 1821
- Capital: Candarave
- Districts: List: Candarave; Cairani; Camilaca; Curibaya; Huanuara; Quilahuani

Government
  - Mayor: Rafael Vega Paniagua

Area
  - Total: 2,261.10 km^{2} (873.02 sq mi)
- Elevation: 3,415 m (11,204 ft)

Population
  - Total: 8,543
  - Density: 3.778/km^{2} (9.786/sq mi)
- UBIGEO: 2302
- Website: www.municandarave.gob.pe

Candarave is a province of the department of Tacna, Peru. Located in the department's northernmost border, it is the smallest of its provinces. Its capital is Candarave.

== Etymology ==
Peruvian linguist Rodolfo Cerrón-Palomino speculates that the name comes from kanta-ra-wi, an Aymara word meaning "place of many lodgings".

== History ==
The first inhabitants descended from the Protocollahuas, the Aymara, and the Tiwanaku peoples. Candarave is a town that originated from Aymara-descended Ayllus.

After Manco Inca's uprising in 1536, Pedro Pizarro pacified the territories of Chucuito, Moquegua, Tacna, and Tarapacá. In 1540, the encomienda system was established in favor of the conquistador Hernán Rodríguez de San Juan, who was required to pay tribute with basic products such as poultry, sheep, pigs, corn, wheat, eggs, and firewood. The cacicazgos, and the Bishop of Arequipa, Manuel Abad Illana, from Valladolid, established their boundaries in 1776.

Later, Candarave was established as a district during the Independence period. By decree of June 25, 1855, it became part of the province of Tacna. By law of November 11, 1874, it became part of the province of Tarata. In 1875, Curibaya and Huanuara were separated to form the district of Curibaya. During its Chilean administration (1880–1929), Candarave served as the provisional capital of the province of Tarata.

The province was created by Law No. 24887, of August 18, 1988, prior to which its territory had belonged to Tacna province.

== Politics ==
The province is administered by a municipal government that also administers Candarave District. The Catholic Church in Peru administers the province as part of the Roman Catholic Diocese of Tacna and Moquegua since 1944.

=== List of mayors ===
Since 2023, the incumbent mayor is Rafael Bernardo Vega Paniagua.

Mayor	Party	Term	
Mayor	Party	Begin	End
Hernán Napoleón Silva Tellería	APRA	1990	1992
Apolinario Quispe Acero	Lista Independiente N.º 5	1993	1995
Apolinario Quispe Acero	Lista Independiente N.º 3	1996	1998
Apolinario Quispe Acero	L. I. de Trabajo para Candarave	1999	2002
Tomás Laqui Villegas	Tacna Heroica	2003	2006
Mario Copa Conde	L. I. Alianza por Tacna	2007	2010
Gerardo Marón Laque	L. I. Banderas Tacneñistas	2011	2014
Juan Quispe Mamani	Movimiento Cívico Peruano	2015	2018
Rodolfo Esteban Nina Yufra	M. I. R. Fuerza Tacna	2019	2022
Rafael Bernardo Vega Paniagua	Siempre Tacna	2023	Incumbent

=== Subdivisions ===
The province is divided into six districts (Spanish: distritos, singular: distrito), each of which is headed by a mayor (alcalde):

- Candarave
- Cairani
- Camilaca
- Curibaya
- Huanuara
- Quilahuani

== Geography ==
Some of the highest peaks of the province are Tutupaka and Yukamani, both are active volcanoes. Other mountains are listed below:

- Apachita Limani
- Arichuwa
- Chinchillani
- Chuqi Ananta
- Churi Laq'a
- Churi Wiqu
- Ch'alla Q'awa
- Ch'alluma
- Ch'ankha Qullu
- Ch'ankhani
- Ch'iyar Jaqhi
- Iru Uma
- Jichu Qullu
- Jisk'a Larqanku
- Kuntur Ikiña
- K'ank'awi
- K'ara K'ara
- Larqanku
- Nasa Parqu
- Panti Usu
- Paxsi Awki
- Phaq'u Muqu
- Phaq'u Q'awa
- Pharaquta
- Qina Mich'i
- Qupa Phuju
- Qura Jawi
- Salla Jaqhi
- Sasawini
- Taypi Sirka
- Titini
- Tutupaka (Moquegua-Tacna)
- Wañuma
- Warintapani
- Watañani
- Waytiri
- Wila Qullu
- Wila Wilani
- Wisk'acha
- Yunkani

=== Boundaries ===
- North: Mariscal Nieto Province in the Moquegua Region
- East: El Collao Province in the Puno Region
- Southeast: Tarata Province
- Southwest: Jorge Basadre Province

== Demographics ==
The province is inhabited by indigenous citizens of Aymara descent. Spanish, however, is the language which the majority of the population (78.17%) learnt to speak in childhood, 20.94% of the residents started speaking using the Aymara language (2007 Peru Census).

== See also ==
- Administrative divisions of Peru
