= Yucamane =

Volcano in Peru

- Yucamani
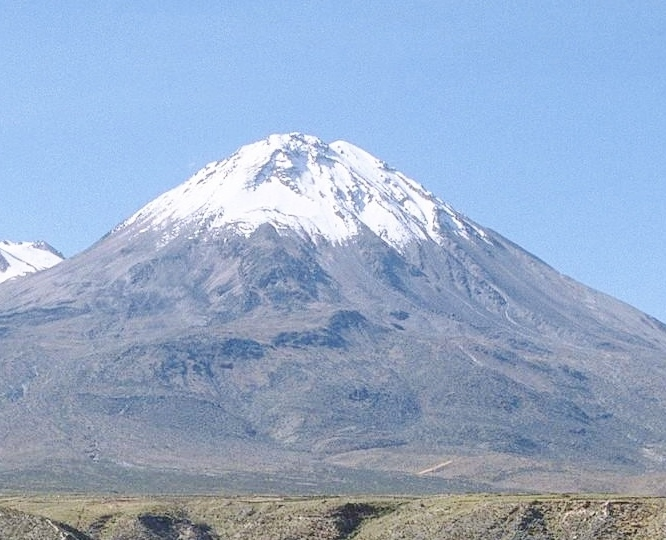
- Yucamane as seen from the southwest.

Highest point
- Coordinates: 17°11′02″S 70°11′46″W

Geography
- Location within Peru
- Location: Peru, Tacna Region

Geology
- Mountain type: Stratovolcanoes
- Last eruption: 1,320 BCE

Yucamane, Yucamani or Yucumane is an andesitic stratovolcano in the Tacna Region of southern Peru. It is part of the Peruvian segment of the Central Volcanic Zone, one of the three volcanic belts of the Andes generated by the subduction of the Nazca plate beneath the South America plate. Peru's active volcanoes Ubinas, Sabancaya and El Misti are also part of the Central Volcanic Zone.

Yucamane, together with the volcanoes Yucamane Chico and Calientes farther north, forms a Pleistocene volcanic group. Yucamane is constructed mainly by lava flows with subordinate pyroclastic deposits, and it has a well preserved summit crater with fumarolic activity.

The volcanic group was active in the Pleistocene epoch, with the Holocene featuring several explosive eruptions occurring at Yucamane proper and effusive eruptions at Calientes. The last dated eruption of Yucamane occurred 1,320 BCE; whether there were historical eruptions is unclear as some eruptions attributed to Yucamane probably took place at Tutupaca.

== Geography and geomorphology ==
Yucamane lies in the Tacna Region, Candarave Province, Candarave District of Peru, west of lake Vilacota. The town of Candarave lies 7 kilometres (4.3 mi)-11 kilometres (6.8 mi) southwest from the volcano and the city of Tacna 90 kilometres (56 mi) south. A number of mostly agricultural towns exist on its slopes, such as Aricota, Cairani, Camilaca, Cucachi, Huanuara, Morjani, Pallata, Susapaya, Tarata, Ticaco, Totora and Yucamane Pampa, as well as irrigation infrastructure and major roads. Sulfur was mined on the volcano in the past.

The area of Yucamane is accessible by a number of roads including the international Ilo-Desaguadero highway, and a road leads up the northwestern flank of Yucamane to a point close to the mountain pass between Yucamane and Calientes. The edifice of the volcano and surrounding region are part of the Vilacota-Maure protected area.

=== Regional ===
The Andes are the longest mountain range on Earth, extending 9,000 kilometres (5,600 mi) from the Tierra del Fuego archipelago in southernmost South America to Venezuela in the north. In southern Peru, the Andes consist of several mountain chains including the Western Cordillera and the Eastern Cordillera, with elevations of up to 4,000–5,000 metres (13,000–16,000 ft), which are separated from each other by the Altiplano.

More than 2,000 volcanoes exist in the Andes, mainly in the countries of Argentina, Bolivia, Chile, Colombia, Ecuador and Peru. Seven volcanoes have been active in Peru since the arrival of the Spaniards, but volcanic activity is typically poorly recorded in Peru, owing to the remote nature of the region and the scarce population.

Yucamane is part of the Central Volcanic Zone, one of the three major volcanic belts in the Andes, which spans the countries of Peru, Bolivia, Chile and Argentina. In Peru about four hundred heavily eroded volcanoes make up the volcanically active area along with the active volcanoes El Misti, Sabancaya and Ubinas; the volcanoes Andagua volcanic field, Casiri, Chachani, Coropuna, Firura, Huaynaputina, Tutupaca and Yucamane may have been active in recent history. The largest historical eruption in Peru occurred in 1600 at Huaynaputina and caused 1,500 fatalities and severe economic damage. Other major eruptions occurred 2,000 years before present at El Misti volcano, 1,000 years before present at Ubinas and two centuries ago at Tutupaca. Finally, the three volcanoes Ampato, Chachani and Coropuna have heights exceeding 6,000 metres (20,000 ft).

=== Local ===
Yucamane is a mountain whose height is variously given as 5,495-metre (18,028 ft), 5,500-metre (18,000 ft) or 5,508-metre (18,071 ft). It is a high compound volcano, with an about 800-metre (2,600 ft) wide summit crater; this depression in turn has a smaller crater with a diameter of 300 metres (980 ft) and a depth of about 120 metres (390 ft) nested within. The summit crater has a young appearance, and due to the youth of the volcano there is little trace of glaciation. Yucamane has a conical shape and is formed primarily by lava flows with some block and ash flows and pyroclastic flows. Lava flows are 20–50 metres (66–164 ft) thick and often show characteristic flow ridges. They are especially prevalent on the upper western and upper southern flanks of the volcano, while the eastern flank has a higher proportion of pyroclastic flows, as does the far southern flank. Based on slope angle, a "Yucamane I" volcano, which forms the lower part of the volcano and has a more gentle slope, has been distinguished from a "Yucamane II", which sits atop "Yucamane I" and has steeper slopes. The lower part of the volcano bears traces of glaciation, presumably from the last glacial maximum. The edifice rises on a gently sloping plain between the Callazas and Calientes rivers. On the southeastern flank a secondary volcanic centre, 4,200-metre (13,800 ft) high Mal Paso, can be found. This cone is 1.5 kilometres (0.93 mi) wide and has a partially destroyed crater.

Several other volcanoes lie north of Yucamane, such as the 5,025 metres (16,486 ft), 5,310-metre (17,420 ft) or 5,355-metre (17,569 ft) high Yucamane Chico and the 5,368-metre (17,612 ft), 5,358-metre (17,579 ft) or 4,980 metres (16,340 ft) high Calientes, which form a 11-kilometre (6.8 mi) long north-south volcanic chain with Yucamane. Calientes and Yucamane are considered to be a paired volcano with a volume of 20–25 cubic kilometres (4.8–6.0 cu mi) and a base area of 58–60 square kilometres (22–23 sq mi). Other volcanoes in the area include San Pedro, López Extraña and the much older Nazaparco. Nazaparco consists of andesitic rocks and rhyolitic block and ash flows, while Yucamane Chico and Calientes are surrounded by radially extending lava flows like Yucamane proper and Calientes has produced a 8–12 cubic kilometres (1.9–2.9 cu mi) ignimbrite south of Yucamane. Calientes has a 1 kilometre (0.62 mi) wide summit crater with a lava dome complex and a 1 kilometre (0.62 mi) long presumably glacial valley filled with the most recent lava domes. While its upper sector is well preserved, the lower flanks like the older volcanoes are eroded. The older volcanoes show evidence of sector collapses and have been glaciated, which has left moraines at elevations of about 4,300 metres (14,100 ft) and glacial deposits with a volume of about 0.5–1 cubic kilometre (0.12–0.24 cu mi). This volcanic complex is part of the Cordillera del Barroso mountain chain in southern Peru.

A series of northwest-southeast trending normal faults runs along the Andes close to Yucamane. The Yucamane fault runs in a north-south direction across the volcanoes, and another fault that runs northwest-southeast is named the Yucamane Chico fault; the Yucamane Chico volcano roughly coincides with the intersection of these faults.

=== Hydrology ===
The slopes of the volcano drain westward, eastward and southward towards the Calientes and Callazas rivers in the east and west of Yucamane, respectively. Both rivers flow southward and ultimately join to form the Locumba river, which ends in the Pacific Ocean. The water in these rivers contains large quantities of arsenic derived from volcanic rocks, including Yucamane's volcanic rocks; arsenic in drinking water is linked to internal organ damage and cancer.

== Geology ==
Off the western coast of South America, the Nazca Plate subducts beneath the South America Plate at a rate of about 4.6 centimetres per year (1.8 in/year). This subduction process is responsible for the volcanic activity in the Andes. The subducting slab releases fluids which induce the formation of melts which are then erupted on the surface as volcanism. The subduction process is not uniform along the plate margin; variations in the dip of the subducting Nazca plate occur along its length, and volcanic activity is concentrated in three belts (Northern Volcanic Zone, Central Volcanic Zone and Southern Volcanic Zone) where the angle of subduction is steep enough.

Volcanism in the region has been active since the Jurassic, with remnants of the oldest volcanic arc recognizable in the Peruvian Coastal Cordillera. During the Miocene epoch, volcanic activity occurred along the entire length of Peru; Pliocene-Pleistocene activity on the other hand is confined to southern Peru as part of the Central Volcanic Zone, with volcanic centres concentrated in the Western Cordillera. Volcanoes in Peru were first catalogued in 1962 and 1966, with a major compilation being published in 1991 by De Silva and Francis. These volcanoes include composite volcanoes, ignimbrites, lava domes and lava flow fields.

Yucamane is constructed on a basement formed by the Paleozoic Tacaza Group (lavas of the lower Tacaza formation), the Jurassic Yura Group (sediments of the Hualhuani formation), the Neogene volcanic Huaylillas formation and the 10-1 million years old Barroso Group; parts of this basement crop out on the southern side of Yucamane. This basement in turn consists of two major tectonic blocks, the southern Arequipa terrane and the northern Paracas massif; both are formed by igneous and metamorphic rocks such as gneiss and are covered by Mesozoic sedimentary and Cenozoic volcanic rocks. A large ring-shaped volcanic intrusion appears to underlie Yucamane.

=== Petrology ===
Yucamane has erupted andesite, basaltic andesite, trachyandesite and dacite, which define a potassium-rich calc-alkaline suite. The andesites make up the bulk of the outcropping edifice. These andesitic rocks contain phenocrysts of amphibole, biotite, hornblende, oxides, plagioclase and quartz. Calientes has produced a similar rock suite but with a dominance of dacite instead of basaltic andesite and andesite as in Yucamane. The magmas formed through the assimilation of crustal material and fractionation of amphibole. Arsenic in volcanic rocks causes water pollution in rivers around Yucamane.

== Climate and natural features ==
The region has a dry tropical climate, with precipitation on Yucamane amounting to about 200–180 millimetres per year (7.9–7.1 in/year). Most of it falls during the summer months, and the amount of precipitation decreases southwestward towards the coast and away from the mountains. After precipitation events the mountain is sometimes covered with snow. Because of the scarcity of precipitation, the volcanoes are relatively uneroded. Above 4,500 metres (14,800 ft) elevation temperatures are almost always freezing, and while at 3,800–4,500 metres (12,500–14,800 ft) elevation daily temperatures can reach 5 °C (41 °F) night frosts are normal.

Vegetation around the volcano includes a humid tundra with overall low vegetation density on its upper slopes, and paramo and montane steppe vegetation east/west and south of the volcano on its lower slopes, respectively. Quenoa woods have been observed on its flanks, which are otherwise covered by pastures lower on the volcano. The volcano is part of the Vilacota Maure Regional Conservation Area. The scorpion species Brachistosternus ninapo is named after the volcano; the term ninapo is a portmanteau of the Quechua word for "fire-spitting mountain". This scorpion was discovered on the sides of the volcanoes Yucamane and El Misti.

== Eruptive history ==
Yucamane Chico has produced rocks dated to 6.14 ± 0.11 and 5.47 ± 0.09 million years ago. Nazaparco was dated to 6.23 ± 0.1 million years ago, while dates of 540,000 ± 270,000, 486,000 ± 11,000, 200,000 - 150,000 (for the ignimbrite. Its eruption probably reached a volcanic explosivity index of 6 and may have produced a now-buried caldera), 126,000 ± 3,000, 95,600 ± 16,700, 133,400 ± 13,500, 102,000 ± 6,000 and 3,000 ± 3,000 years ago. Yucamane itself has an undated first stage, lava flows dated at 380,000 ± 300,000, 23,000 ± 1,000, 7,100 ± 1,000 and 3,000 ± 2,000 years before present. The activity of Calientes and Yucamane overlapped in time, and both have generated lava flows which lie above moraines.

Tephrochronology has shown the occurrence of an eruption 44,000 ± 2,130/2,910 years ago; another one occurred 36,450 ± 250 years ago and generated a lateral blast that emplaced a block-and-ash deposit on the western and southern flanks. Other events occurred 29,200 + 170/−160, forming the Honda block-and-ash flow deposit, and 3,270 ± 50/3,085 ± 35 years before present; during the course of this eruption Yucamane expelled at least 7,000,000 cubic metres (250,000,000 cu ft) of material in the form of pumice, lapilli and tephra. This eruption had a volcanic explosivity index of 5; fallout deposits reached the Quelccaya Ice Cap and influenced the chemistry of lakes close to the ice cap. Activity during the late Pleistocene and Holocene epochs was mainly explosive with Vulcanian eruptions and phreatomagmatic eruptions among others, which generated volcanic ash falls, block and ash flows, pyroclastic flows and pyroclastic surges. In total, about 4-5 explosive eruptions occurred in post-glacial time and left tephra deposits over the southern and southeastern flanks of the edifice.

=== Historical activity ===
Eruptions reported in 1787, 1802, 1862 and 1902 in the region have also been attributed to Yucamane, although some may actually have occurred at Tutupaca. (Note: Candarave inhabitants call Tutupaca the "bad mountain" and Yucamane the "good mountain", which may refer to volcanic activity at the former. Volcanic activity at Tutupaca was attributed to Yucamane in part because Tutupaca is more heavily eroded.) The 1787 and 1902 events involved the emission of ash; an 1874 edition of the Arequipa-based El Deber newspaper states that Yucamane was "bursting" and "steaming" in 1787. There does not appear to be any volcanic material more recent than the 3,270 ± 50/3,085 ± 35 eruption, however. Overall, historical records are fragmentary and scarce, and the Global Volcanism Program recognizes the 1,320 BCE eruption as the most recent event.

Yucamane is fumarolically active in its summit crater, the fumaroles are most recognizable after precipitation and are not very intense. Presently, Yucamane is considered to be a dormant volcano. Thermal anomalies of about 3 °C (5.4 °F) of uncertain origin have been observed on Yucamane by satellite imagery. The Caliente geothermal field east of Yucamane, which includes geysers and hot springs, appears to be unrelated to Yucamane.

=== Hazards ===
As of 2021, the volcano is monitored with seismometers, detectors of tilt and cameras. The Peruvian geological agency INGEMMET considers Yucamane a "moderately hazardous" volcano; it has published ash fall, lava flow and pyroclastic flow hazard maps for Yucamane, and additional hazard maps are available on its website. According to these the western, eastern and southern flanks could be threatened by lava flows, whereas the older volcanoes protect much of the northern flank. Hazards from pyroclastic flows extend farther, down to the Laguna Aricota lake southwest of the volcano. Hazards from lava flows derive from their ability to bury land and to ignite flammable materials, as well as the possible creation of lava dams on rivers and outburst floods when they break, while the high speed and temperatures of pyroclastic flows threatens people with asphyxiation, burial and burns. More than 9,000 people live in the danger zone.

Ash fall from an eruption could extend southeastward to the border with Chile and affect the towns of Candarave, Ilabaya, Pachia, Palca and Tarata. Volcanic earthquakes like the 1999 Ticsani earthquakes at a volcano farther north and volcanic gases constitute additional dangers.

== See also ==
- Chiarjaque
- Choreveco
