= Challuma =

Mountain in Peru

- Location within Peru

Highest point
- Elevation: 5,187 m (17,018 ft)
- Coordinates: 16°47′03″S 70°20′04″W

Geography
- Location: Peru, Moquegua Region, Mariscal Nieto Province, Tacna Region, Candarave Province
- Parent range: Andes

Challuma (possibly from Aymara ch'alla sand, uma water, "sand water") is a 5,187-metre-high (17,018 ft) mountain in the Andes of southern Peru near a lake of the same name. It is situated in the Moquegua Region, Mariscal Nieto Province, Carumas District, and in the Tacna Region, Candarave Province, Candarave District. It lies northeast of the mountain Churilaca.

Challuma is also the name of the valley on the south side of the mountain. Its intermittent stream flows to a small lake named Challuma which lies in the Candarave District at 16°49′27″S 70°19′44″W.
