= Paxsi Awki =

Mountain in Peru

- Location within Peru

Highest point
- Elevation: 5,344 m (17,533 ft)
- Coordinates: 16°49′7″S 70°10′57″W

Geography
- Location: Peru, Moquegua Region, Mariscal Nieto Province, Tacna Region, Candarave Province
- Parent range: Andes

Paxsi Awki (Aymara paxsi moon, awki father / mister, sir, lord, "moon father" or moon lord", Hispanicized spellings Pacsiauqui, Pacchiauqui) is a mountain in the Andes of southern Peru, about 5,344 metres (17,533 ft) high. It is situated in the Moquegua Region, Mariscal Nieto Province, Carumas District, and in the Tacna Region, Candarave Province, Candarave District.
