= Churilaca =

Mountain in Peru

- Location within Peru

Highest point
- Elevation: 5,260 m (17,260 ft)
- Coordinates: 16°47′23″S 70°21′15″W

Geography
- Location: Peru, Moquegua Region, Mariscal Nieto Province, Tacna Region, Candarave Province
- Parent range: Andes

Churilaca (possibly from Aymara churi dull yellow, laq'a earth (soil), "dull yellow earth") is a 5,260-metre-high (17,257 ft) mountain in the Andes of southern Peru. It is situated in the Moquegua Region, Mariscal Nieto Province, Carumas District, and in the Tacna Region, Candarave Province, Candarave District. Churilaca lies south-west of the mountain Challuma.
