= Candarave =

Town in Peru

- Town
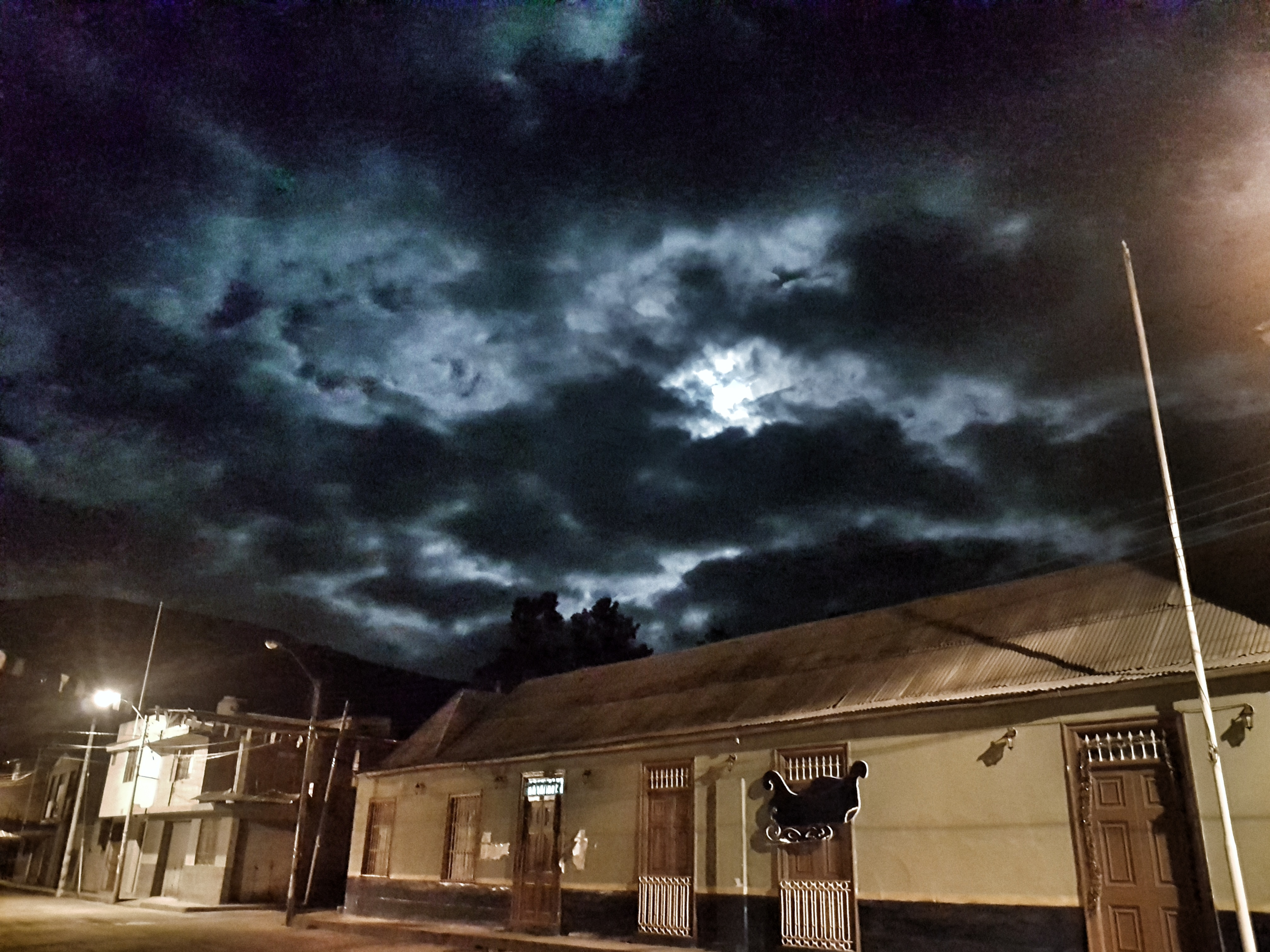
- Nighttime at the Main Square

- Location within Peru
- Coordinates: 17°16′15″S 70°15′06″W
- Country: Peru
- Region: Tacna
- Province: Candarave
- District: Candarave

Government
  - Mayor: Mario Genaro Copa Conde
- Time zone: UTC-5 (PET)

Candarave is a town in southern Peru. It is the capital of the province of the same name in the department of Tacna.

== Etymology ==
Peruvian linguist Rodolfo Cerrón-Palomino speculates that the name comes from kanta-ra-wi, an Aymara word meaning "place of many lodgings".

== Geography ==
=== Climate ===
Climate data for Candarave, elevation 3,415 m (11,204 ft), (1991–2020)
Month	Jan	Feb	Mar	Apr	May	Jun	Jul	Aug	Sep	Oct	Nov	Dec	Year
Mean daily maximum °C (°F)	16.6 (61.9)	16.2 (61.2)	16.8 (62.2)	17.1 (62.8)	16.6 (61.9)	15.8 (60.4)	15.7 (60.3)	16.6 (61.9)	17.2 (63.0)	17.6 (63.7)	17.7 (63.9)	17.5 (63.5)	16.8 (62.2)
Mean daily minimum °C (°F)	4.9 (40.8)	5.1 (41.2)	4.8 (40.6)	3.7 (38.7)	2.2 (36.0)	1.1 (34.0)	1.0 (33.8)	2.0 (35.6)	2.9 (37.2)	3.2 (37.8)	3.3 (37.9)	4.1 (39.4)	3.2 (37.8)
Average precipitation mm (inches)	60.0 (2.36)	72.3 (2.85)	33.4 (1.31)	3.3 (0.13)	0.5 (0.02)	0.2 (0.01)	1.7 (0.07)	0.7 (0.03)	1.2 (0.05)	0.9 (0.04)	1.1 (0.04)	18.7 (0.74)	194 (7.65)
Source: National Meteorology and Hydrology Service of Peru
