= Lake Vizcacha =

Lake in Peru

Lake Vizcacha Laguna Vizcacha
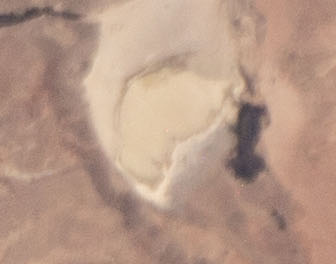
- Lake Vizcacha seen from the ISS

- Location within Peru
- Location: Moquegua Region
- Coordinates: 16.883448°S 70.222974°W
- Basin countries: Peru

Lake Vizcacha (Laguna Vizcacha) is a lake in the Moquegua Region of Peru.

== See also ==
- List of lakes in Peru
