= Tutupaca =

Volcano in Peru

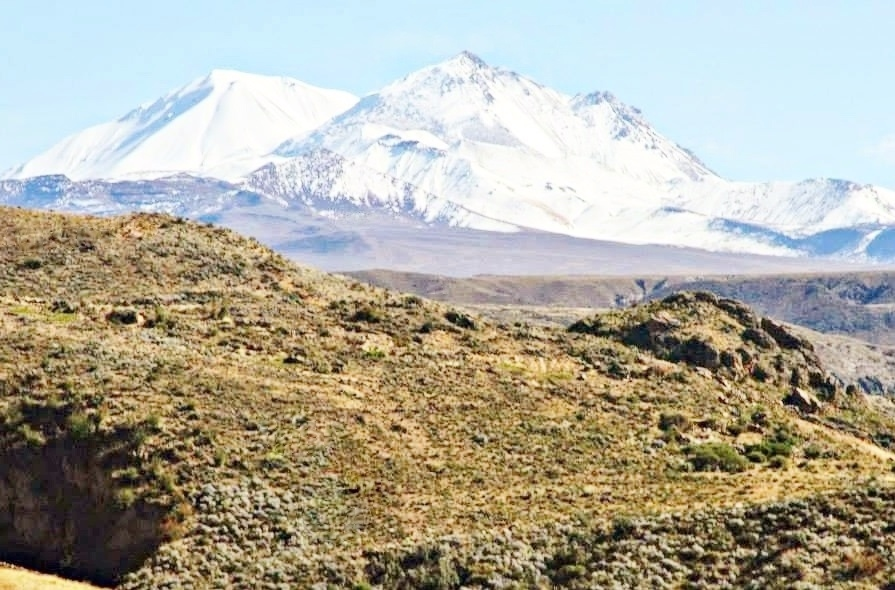
- Tutupaca viewed from a southern direction.

Highest point
- Elevation: 5,815 m (19,078 ft)
- Coordinates: 17.026°S 70.372°W

Geography
- Location within Peru

Geology
- Mountain type: Stratovolcanoes
- Volcanic arc: Andean Volcanic Belt
- Last eruption: 1802

Tutupaca is a volcano in the region of Tacna in Peru. It is part of the Peruvian segment of the Central Volcanic Zone, one of several volcanic belts in the Andes. Tutupaca consists of three overlapping volcanoes formed by lava flows and lava domes made out of andesite and dacite, which grew on top of older volcanic rocks. The highest of these is usually reported to be 5,815 metres (19,078 ft) tall and was glaciated in the past.

Several volcanoes in Peru have been active in recent times, including Tutupaca. Their volcanism is caused by the subduction of the Nazca Plate beneath the South America Plate. One of these volcanoes collapsed in historical time, probably in 1802, generating a large debris avalanche with a volume likely exceeding 0.6–0.8 cubic kilometres (0.14–0.19 cu mi) and a pyroclastic flow. The associated eruption was among the largest in Peru for which there are historical records. The volcano became active about 700,000 years ago, and activity continued into the Holocene, but whether there were historical eruptions was initially unclear; some eruptions were instead attributed to the less eroded Yucamane volcano. The Peruvian government plans to monitor the volcano for future activity. Tutupaca features geothermal manifestations with fumaroles and hot springs.

== Oral tradition ==
The people in Candarave considered Tutupaca to be a "bad" mountain, while Yucamane was the "good" one; this may reflect that Tutupaca had recent volcanic eruptions. The Peruvian geographer Mateo Paz Soldán dedicated an ode to Tutupaca.

== Geology and geomorphology ==
Tutupaca is 25–30 kilometres (16–19 mi) north of the town of Candarave in the eponymous district of the Tacna Region in Peru. Lake Suches and Laguna Paracota lie north of the volcano, and two rivers flow nearby: the Callazas River, flowing eastward to the north of the volcano, and then southward past Tutupaca's eastern flank, and the Tacalaya River, which flows south along Tutupaca's western flank. (Note: The course of both rivers is influenced by tectonic lineaments.) The local climate is cold, and the terrain is stony, with little vegetation. During the wet season, the mountain is snow-covered, and meltwater from Tutupaca and other regional mountains is an important source of water for the rivers in the region. Neighbouring towns include Sorijani, Tolaveco, Cala Circa, Huajañani, Humapalca, Turun Turun, Huaylani, Pocucho, Quilcata and Tacalaya. Several roads pass around the volcano, while the volcano itself is largely unaffected by human activity.

Tutupaca consists of two (Note: One source gives three: Basal Tutupaca, West Tutupaca and Recent Tutupaca) volcanic complexes: an older complex that is highly eroded, and two northerly peaks which formed more recently. Of these, the western peak ("western Tutupaca") consists of lava domes, lava flows and Plinian eruption deposits of Pleistocene age, and reaches a height of 5,815 metres (19,078 ft). The eastern peak ("eastern Tutupaca") consists of seven presumably Holocene lava domes and is 5,790 metres (19,000 ft) high. (Note: These heights are from a 2015 source.) The Global Volcanism Program gives heights of 5,753 metres (18,875 ft) for the eastern and 5,801 metres (19,032 ft) for the western summit. The western peak is the highest summit of Tutupaca.

The base that Tutupaca rises from lies at elevations ranging from 4,400 metres (14,400 ft) to 4,600 metres (15,100 ft) and the volcano covers a surface area of about 150–170 square kilometres (58–66 sq mi). The older complex is formed mainly by lava flows, which during the Pleistocene were eroded by glaciers forming up to 100 metres (330 ft) thick moraines and U-shaped glacial valleys. Cirques and moraines are also found on the western summit, and tephra layers extend west of the volcano. The older complex, which includes lava domes in the form of small hills on its southern part, was the source of ignimbrite that covers the western and southern parts of the volcano. Postglacial lava flows emanating from a vent located between the two peaks have been identified. One 2024 map indicated that there are still glaciers on Tutupaca. Proglacial processes like frost shattering have altered young volcanic products.

=== Composition ===
The older complex and western Tutupaca have erupted andesite and dacite, while eastern Tutupaca has only produced dacite. Trachyandesite and trachyte also occur. The volcanic rocks erupted during the Holocene define a potassium-rich calc-alkaline suite. Dacites from eastern Tutupaca contain amphibole, apatite, biotite, clinopyroxene, iron-titanium oxides, orthopyroxene, plagioclase, quartz, and sphene. Mafic (Note: A volcanic rock relatively rich in iron and magnesium, relative to silicium.) rock fragments are rarely found embedded in Tutupaca rocks. The basal volcanic rocks have suffered hydrothermal alteration, forming clays. Elemental sulfur deposits have been identified at Tutupaca and a 1996 map of the volcano shows a sulfur mine on its southeastern flank.

=== Sector collapse ===
A 1 kilometre (0.62 mi) wide amphitheater in eastern Tutupaca, open to the northeast, was formed by a major collapse of the volcano. Lava domes from the younger Tutupaca, as well as highly altered lavas from the older complex, are exposed within the collapse scar, which is the origin of a 6–8-kilometre (3.7–5.0 mi) long debris avalanche deposit. The deposit is mostly found within glacial valleys and is interlaid by the Paipatja pyroclastic flow which divides the debris into two units. The pyroclastic flow reaches both Lake Suches north of the volcano and the Callazas River east of it.

The two units of the debris avalanche are distinguished by their appearance. One features 100–200-metre (330–660 ft) long hummock-like hills, as is typical for volcanic debris avalanches, and the other has ridges which vary in length from 100 to 150 metres (330 to 490 ft). The ridges range from only a few meters to more than 0.5 metres (1 ft 8 in) in height, and from 10 to 30 metres (33 to 98 ft) in height. Such ridges have been observed in other collapse deposits such as at Shiveluch volcano in Russia, and have been explained by sorting processes that take place within granular flows. The differences between the two units appear to be because the first unit was formed from the basal part of Tutupaca, while the second unit was formed by the more recent lava domes of the eastern volcano and formed a granular flow.

The collapse possibly started in the hydrothermal system of the volcano and progressed to affect a growing lava dome, with a total volume probably exceeding 0.6–0.8 cubic kilometres (0.14–0.19 cu mi). The total surface area covered by the collapse is about 12–13 square kilometres (4.6–5.0 sq mi). This collapse was not the first in the history of Tutupaca: collapses on the southeast-east flanks of the volcano occurred 6,000–7,500 years ago and delivered debris through glacial valleys on the eastern and southeastern side of the volcano, and on the western side of the volcano a collapse took place before 17,000–25,000 years ago. Such large collapses of volcanoes took place in historical time at Mount Bandai in 1888 and Mount St. Helens in 1980; they can produce large avalanches of debris.

=== Geologic context ===
Off the coast of Peru, the Nazca Plate subducts at 5–6 centimetres per year (2.0–2.4 in/year) beneath the South America Plate, causing volcanism in three of the four volcanic belts in the Andes, including the Central Volcanic Zone where Tutupaca is located. (Note: The Central Volcanic Zone is one of four volcanic belts in the Andes, together with the Northern Volcanic Zone, the Southern Volcanic Zone and the Austral Volcanic Zone.) Other Peruvian volcanoes include Sara Sara, Solimana, Coropuna, the Andagua volcanic field, Ampato–Sabancaya–Hualca Hualca, Chachani, El Misti, Ubinas, Huaynaputina, Ticsani, Yucamane, Purupuruni and Casiri. During historical times, major eruptions took place in Peru at El Misti 2,000 years ago and at Huaynaputina in 1600, the latter of which claimed 1,500 fatalities and disrupted the climate of Earth.

The basement of the region consists of folded Mesozoic sediments, and Cenozoic volcanic and sedimentary cover which overlies the Mesozoic rocks. There are many tectonic lineaments and faults which were active in the Tertiary; one of these crosses Tutupaca from north to south, and others influence the positions of geothermal features. The Huaylillas ignimbrite complex (Note: The Huaylillas ignimbrites were emplaced between 24 and 12 million years ago.) underlies some of the volcanic centres, which include a first set of eroded volcanoes that were active between 8.4–5 and 4–2 million years ago, principally erupting lava flows. These were followed by a second set of volcanoes which were also mainly active with lava flows, such as Casiri, Tutupaca, and Yucamane. A third phase formed dacitic lava domes such as Purupuruni about 100,000 years ago. Other, older stratovolcanoes are found at Tutupaca and are heavily eroded by glaciers.

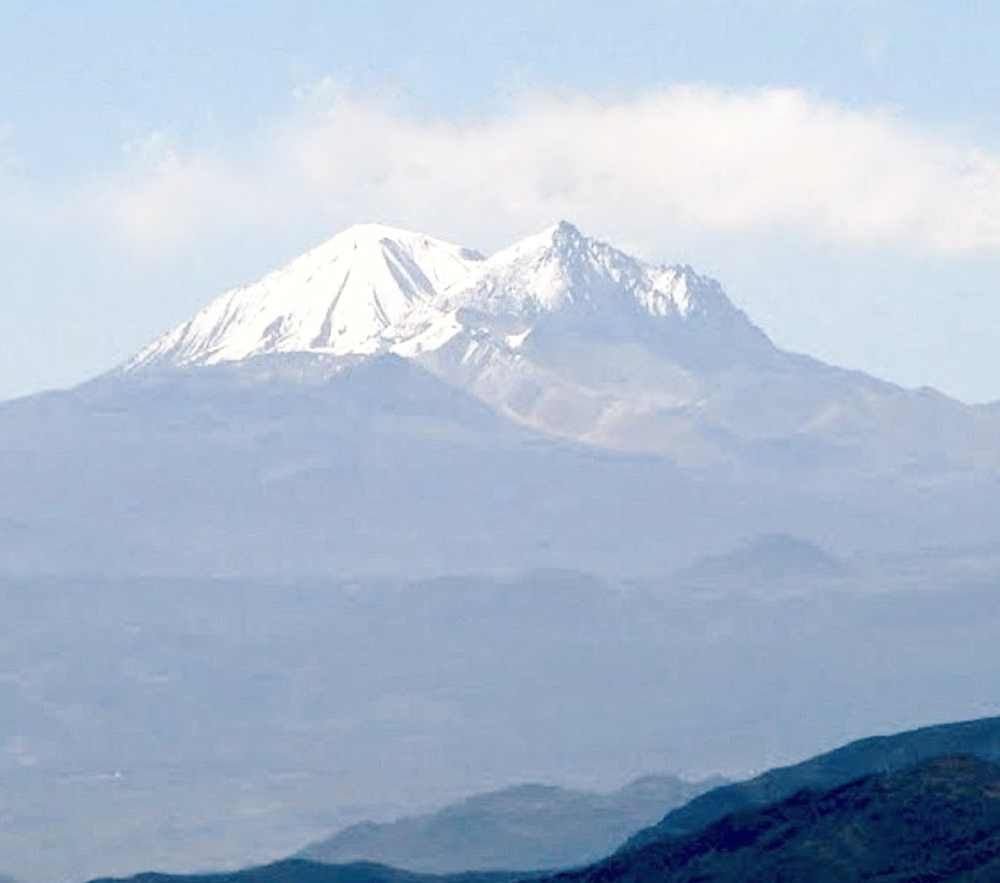
Tutupaca volcano

== Climate and vegetation ==
Most of the volcanoes in the Central Volcanic Zone are located at over 4,000 metres (13,000 ft) elevation where the climate is cold with frequent freezes. Most precipitation falls between January and March, at Tutupaca it amounts to 200–560 millimetres per year (7.9–22.0 in/year). In the Western Cordillera, altitudes between 3,500–3,900 metres (11,500–12,800 ft) are dominated by vegetation such as cacti, herbs, Peruvian feather grass, and yareta, but also lichens and mosses. Wetlands, called bofedales, display a diverse plant life. Above 4,000 metres (13,000 ft) elevation plant life diminishes and in 2003–2012 by 5,800 metres (19,000 ft) there was perpetual snow. The volcano is part of the Vilacota Maure Regional Conservation Area.

== Eruption history ==
The oldest volcanic rocks of Tutupaca are 1,135,000 ± 17,000 years old. The older complex was active at first with lava flows and then with a major explosive eruption; a pumice-and-ash flow forms the "Callazas" deposit and may have been produced either by the older complex or by western Tutupaca. A long hiatus separated the activity of the older complex from that of western and eastern Tutupaca. The small lava domes on the older complex have been dated to 260,000 ± 200,000 while more recent domes are 33,000±5,000 years old. Volcanic activity continued into the Holocene, and the volcano is considered to be potentially active. Today, fumaroles occur on the summit of Tutupaca and a north-northwest trending line away from it, and seismic activity has been recorded.

There are reports of eruptions in 1780, 1787, 1802, 1862 and 1902, supported by dates obtained through radiocarbon dating showing there were eruptions during this period. Some authors believed that Yucamane volcano was a more likely source for these eruptions, but Samaniego 2015 et al. showed that Yucumane last erupted 3,000 years ago, implying that the reported eruptions, especially the 1802 and 1787 events, most likely occurred at Tutupaca. Tutupaca is a possible source of the AD 400–720 Khonkho tephra in the Altiplano.

The sector collapse of eastern Tutupaca was accompanied by an eruption that was among the largest in Peruvian history, reaching a volcanic explosivity index of 3 or 4. Contemporaneous chronicles document ashfall as far as 165 kilometres (103 mi) to the south in Arica. The collapse has been dated to 1731–1802 with high probability (Note: The uncalibrated radiocarbon age of the samples is 218±14 years before present, with 95% confidence; the calibrated age consists of two ranges, with an 85% probability that the date lies between 1731 and 1802.) and is thought to be associated with the 1802 eruption. The eruption was probably triggered by the entry of fresh, hot magma into a dacitic magma chamber. Shortly before the collapse, (Note: Stratigraphic relations imply that this pyroclastic flow predates the main collapse, but radiocarbon dating does not have sufficient resolution to separate the two events in time.) a pyroclastic flow erupted from the volcano probably as a consequence of the collapse of a lava dome. It formed a deposit on the east flank of Tutupaca, which reaches a thickness of 6 metres (20 ft). The previous eruption may have destabilized the volcano and triggered the main collapse, which also generated the Paipatja pyroclastic flow. The area was thinly inhabited at the time, and thus the impact of the eruption was small.

=== Hazards ===
Based on the history of Tutupaca, a future eruption can be envisaged where renewed activity causes another collapse of the volcano. In this case, about 8,000–10,000 people, as well as neighboring geothermal power and mining infrastructure, would be in danger. Several small towns, diversion dams, irrigation canals, and the two roads Ilo–Desaguadero and Tacna–Tarata–Candarave would also be vulnerable. Other dangers are ballistic rocks, pyroclastic flows, scoria avalanches, ash and pumice rains, volcanic gas and lahars. Tutupaca along with Ubinas and Huaynaputina is one of the three volcanoes in Peru to have produced large explosive eruptions.

The Peruvian Instituto Geológico, Minero y Metalúrgico (Note: A public agency which is among other things responsible for monitoring volcanoes in Peru.) (INGEMMET) has published a volcano hazard map for Tutupaca. In 2017, Tutupaca was identified as one of the volcanoes to be monitored by the future Peruvian Southern Volcano Observatory. This would entail surveillance of earthquake activity, changes in the composition of fumarole gases and deformation of the volcanoes, and real-time video. This project, budgeted to cost 18,500,000 Peruvian sols (4768041 US dollars) and involves the construction of thirty monitoring stations and the main observatory in the Sachaca District, became active in 2019. Publication of regular activity reports began in May 2019. The volcano is classified as "moderately dangerous".

=== Geothermal activity ===
Tutupaca is also the name of a geothermal field in the neighborhood of the volcano, which includes the areas of Aychullo, Azufre Chico, Azufre Grande, Callazas River, Pampa Turun Turun, and Tacalaya River (there are some discrepancies between sources on their naming and identity); they are part of the same geothermal system whose temperature at depth is higher than 200 °C (392 °F). The fields feature fumaroles, geysers, mud pots and occurrences of sulfur, both solid and in the form of hydrogen sulfide gas, as well as siliceous sinter and travertine deposits. Hot springs at the foot of the Tutupaca volcano and in its valleys discharge water into the rivers.

Tutupaca has been mentioned as a potential site for geothermal power generation. In 2013, Canada's Alterra Power and the Philippine Energy Development Corporation developed a joint venture to work on a geothermal prospect at Tutupaca, although work at Tutupaca had not begun by October 2014. The estimated geothermal potential (in megawatts electricity) in 2024 was as a minimum 50 megawatt.
