= Lake Vilacota =

Lake in Tacna, Peru

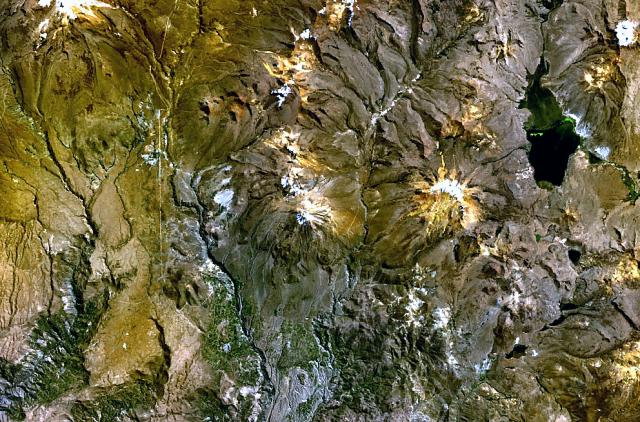
- Lake Vilacota (on the right) (NASA Landsat7 image)

- Location within Peru
- Location: Tacna Region
- Coordinates: 17°09′S 70°02′W
- Primary inflows: Quillvire River
- Primary outflows: Unnamed stream to Lake Ancocota Evaporation
- Catchment area: 1,440 square kilometres (556 sq mi)
- Basin countries: Peru
- Surface elevation: 4,390 metres (14,403 ft)

Lake Vilacota (possibly from Aymara wila red / blood, quta lake, "red lake") is a lake in the region of Tacna, in Peru. More precisely, it belongs to Tarata Province, Susapaya District, along the border with the Santa Rosa District of El Collao Province in the neighboring region of Puno. It has a surface elevation of 4,390 metres (14,403 ft) above sea level and a catchment area of 1,440 square kilometres (556 sq mi).

Yucamane volcano lies west of the lake. To the east of Lake Vilacota there is a smaller lake named Ancocota (possibly Aymara for "white lake"); both lakes being connected by a short river. Moreover, both lakes are the headwaters of Mauri River.

== See also ==
- List of lakes in Peru
