= Department of Tacna =

Department of Peru

Tacna Taqna (Aymara and Quechua)
- Department
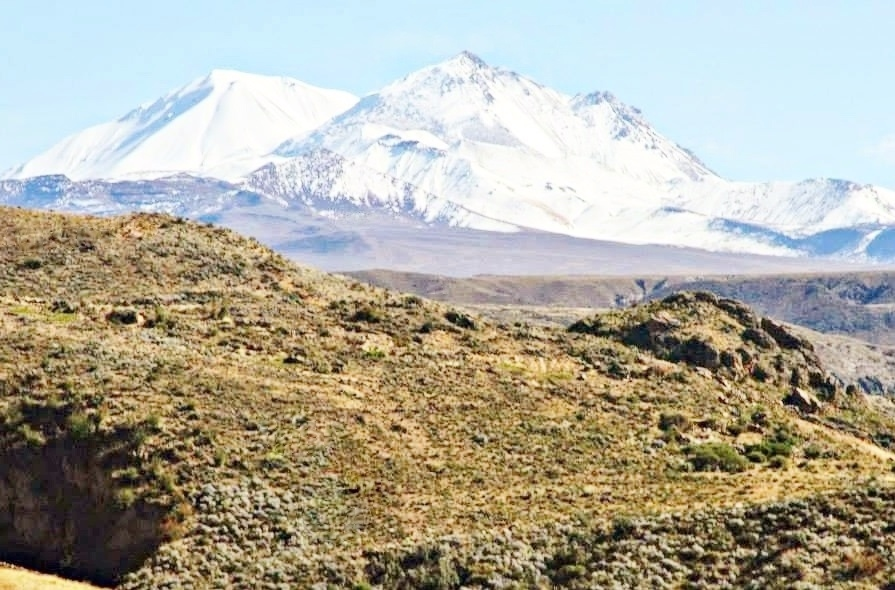
- Tutupaca Volcano in the Andes

- Flag Coat of arms

- Location of Tacna within Peru
- Coordinates: 17.6°S 70.2°W
- Country: Peru
- Established: June 25, 1875
- Capital: Tacna
- Provinces: List: Candarave; Jorge Basadre; Tacna; Tarata

Government
  - Type: Regional Government
  - Governor: Juan Tonconi Quispe

Area
  - Total: 16,075.89 km^{2} (6,206.94 sq mi)
- Elevation (Capital): 562 m (1,844 ft)
- Highest elevation: 3,415 m (11,204 ft)
- Lowest elevation: 0 m (0 ft)

Population (2025 census)
  - Total: 389,302
  - Density: 24.2165/km^{2} (62.7205/sq mi)
- Demonym: tacneño/a
- UBIGEO: 23
- Dialing code: 052
- ISO 3166 code: PE-TAC
- Principal resources: Grapevine, cotton, copper.
- Poverty rate: 32.8%
- Percentage of Peru's GDP: 1.7%
- Website: www.regiontacna.gob.pe

Tacna (Spanish pronunciation: [ˈtaɣna]; Aymara and Quechua: Taqna) is a department of Peru. It is the southernmost department of the country, bordering Chile and Bolivia. It is administered by a regional government. Its capital city is Tacna.

== Etymology ==
The term Tacna is derived from two Quechua words: Taka, meaning 'to hit', and na, which means 'place'. Thus, the full name means "I hit this place" or "I rule this place".

During the country's territorial dispute with Chile, the department and province both took the official name of "Free Tacna" (Spanish: Tacna Libre), as opposed to "Unredeemed Tacna" (Spanish: Tacna Irredenta), a name that applied to the area under Chilean administration.

== History ==
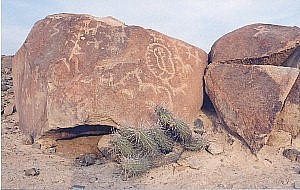
Miculla Petroglyphs in Pachía District.

There is evidence of the presence of a very early culture that goes back almost 10,000 years. The archaeological investigations in the region have proven that a civilization dwelt in this zone in the Stone Age. The Toquepala Caves (7630 BC) and Abrigo de Caru (6240 BC) belong to this age. There are other sites such as Girata Complex, Mullini, and Queñavichinca, where investigations have not been concluded.

=== Spanish period ===
The first groups of Spanish conquerors arrived in the region in 1535. These groups were formed by members of the Almagro expedition, organised to conquer Chile. During this time, the city of Tacna was called Villa San Pedro de Tacna. In 1615 and 1784 Tacna experienced violent earthquakes, and many towns were reduced to ruins. However, they were rebuilt in the same locations as before.

=== Republican period ===
Tacna has a seat of honour in the emancipation process. In 1811, Francisco Antonio de Zela made the first declarations in favour of a libertarian administration from Tacna. Once the Peruvian independence struggle was well under way, the heroism of this city was honoured by the revolutionary government's proclamation to promote it to the rank of villa in 1823. On 26 May 1828, President José de La Mar promulgated a law passed by Congress by which the city of Tacna was given the title of Ciudad Heroica (Heroic City).

On June 25, 1875, the department of Tacna was created by law. It included the provinces of Tacna, Arica and Tarata. This was the last administrative change prior to the War of the Pacific, which began in 1879.

Province	Seat	Districts
Tacna	Tacna	Tacna, Pachía, Calana, Sama, Locumba, Ilabaya
Tarata	Tarata	Tarata, Estique, Tarucachi, Ticaco, Candarave
Arica	Arica	Arica, Codpa, Livilcar, Lluta, Socoroma

The first Peruvian territory to be occupied by the Chilean Army during the war was the port of Pisagua, whose occupation took place on November 2 of that year. The Chilean campaign was successful, and led to the military occupation of the provinces of Iquique and Tarapacá following the Peruvian retreat despite a military success at the battle of Tarapacá.

The first Peruvian troops that left Tarapacá arrived to the city of Arica on December 17. The following year, the Chilean Navy carried out an amphibious landing at the port city of Ilo on February 26, and the bombardment of Arica began the following day. The army continued to the south until it reached the city of Tacna on May 26, after which a battle was fought at Intiorko Hill, located on the outskirts of the city. The Chilean Army subsequently occupied the city and Bolivia withdrew from the conflict. On June 7, the Chilean advance reached and conquered Arica.

Following another campaign that reached the capital, the government of Miguel Iglesias signed the Treaty of Ancón on October 20, 1883. Under the terms of the agreement, Peru ceded its department of Tarapacá, while the provinces of Tacna and Arica would be subject to Chilean control, after which a plebiscite would be held. This never came to pass.

Prior to the war, the department had a total area of around 33,000 square kilometres (13,000 sq mi).

=== Chilean period ===
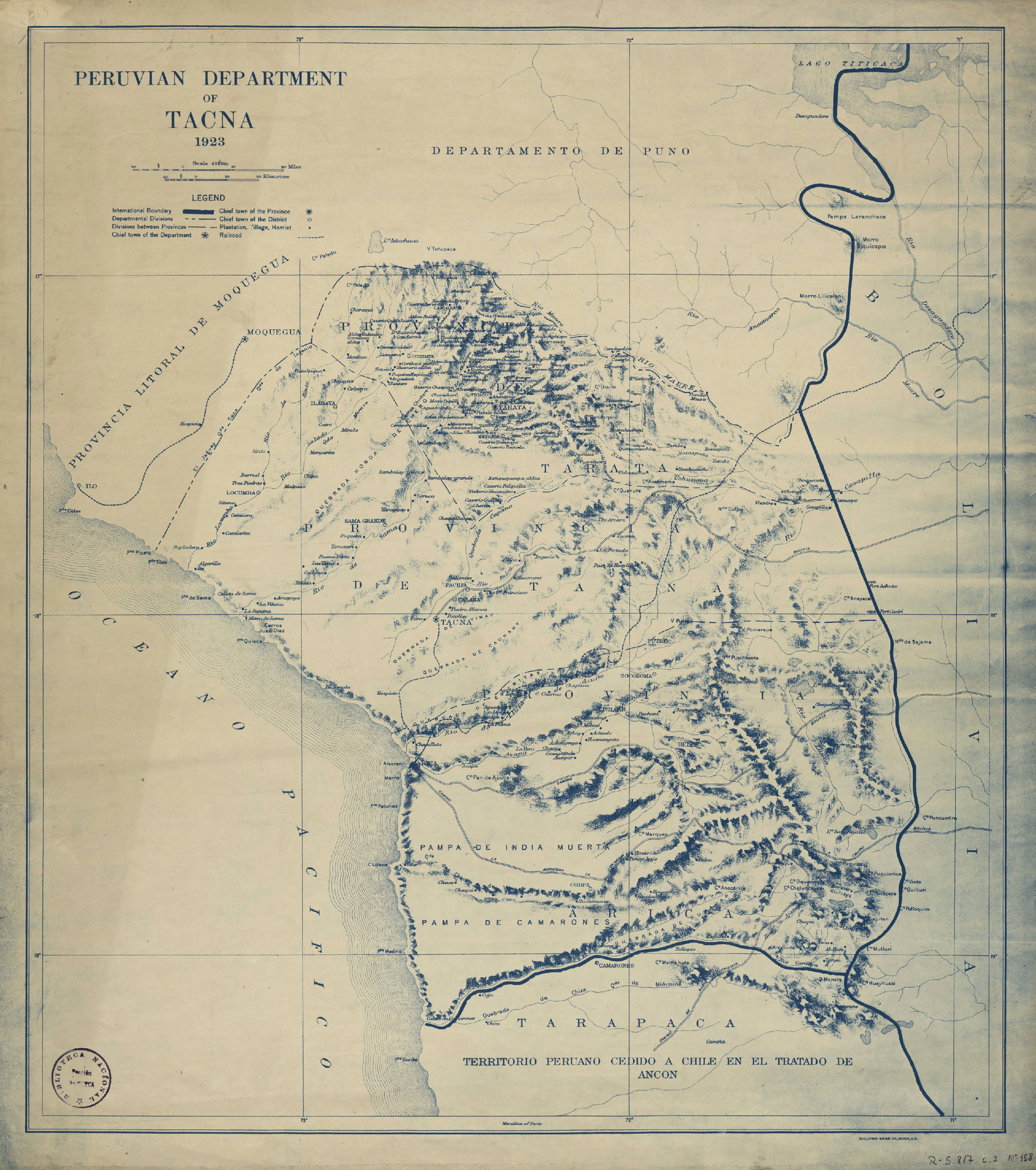
De jure map of Tacna in 1923.

From 1880 to 1929, the provinces of Arica and Tacna were central to the 46-year dispute between both Peru and Chile. Tacna was divided into an area administered by Chile, and another one administered by Peru. Both territories were divided by the quebrada Honda, a ravine of the Sama River.

On April 1, 1884, Miguel Iglesias created the department of Moquegua, incorporating the districts of Locumba and Ilabaya. On October 31 of the same year, the Chilean government established its own province of Tacna, subjecting the territory to a process of forced acculturation. Meanwhile, three years after Moquegua's creation, Andrés Avelino Cáceres declared its law null and void, with the districts returning to their original jurisdiction.

The Supreme Resolution of April 18, 1887, designated the towns of Ilabaya and Candarave as provincial seats of the sub-prefects of Tacna and Tarata. On January 10, 1890, a Supreme Resultion designated the town of Locumba as the capital of the province and department of Free Tacna (Spanish: Tacna Libre), a name that would apply to the non-occupied area for the remainder of the dispute. At the time, the town had a population of 300 inhabitants. The same document established the parliamentary representation of one senator and two deputies representing Tacna and Tarata.

In 1921, the department's de jure 32,618 square kilometres (12,594 sq mi) area was distributed as follows:

- Arica: 13,445 square kilometres (5,191 sq mi), with a population of 15,104 inhabitants.
- Tacna: 14,195 square kilometres (5,481 sq mi), with a population of 20,887 inhabitants.
- Tarata: 4,978 square kilometres (1,922 sq mi), with a population of 14,458 inhabitants.

In 1929, the dispute came to an end with the signing of the Treaty of Lima. Peru agreed to keep the province of Tacna, while that of Arica would be incorporated into Chile. Peru also received a $6 million indemnity and other concessions. During this period, notable people who resided in the area were later politician Salvador Allende and his family, and Peruvian historian Jorge Basadre.

=== Contemporary period ===
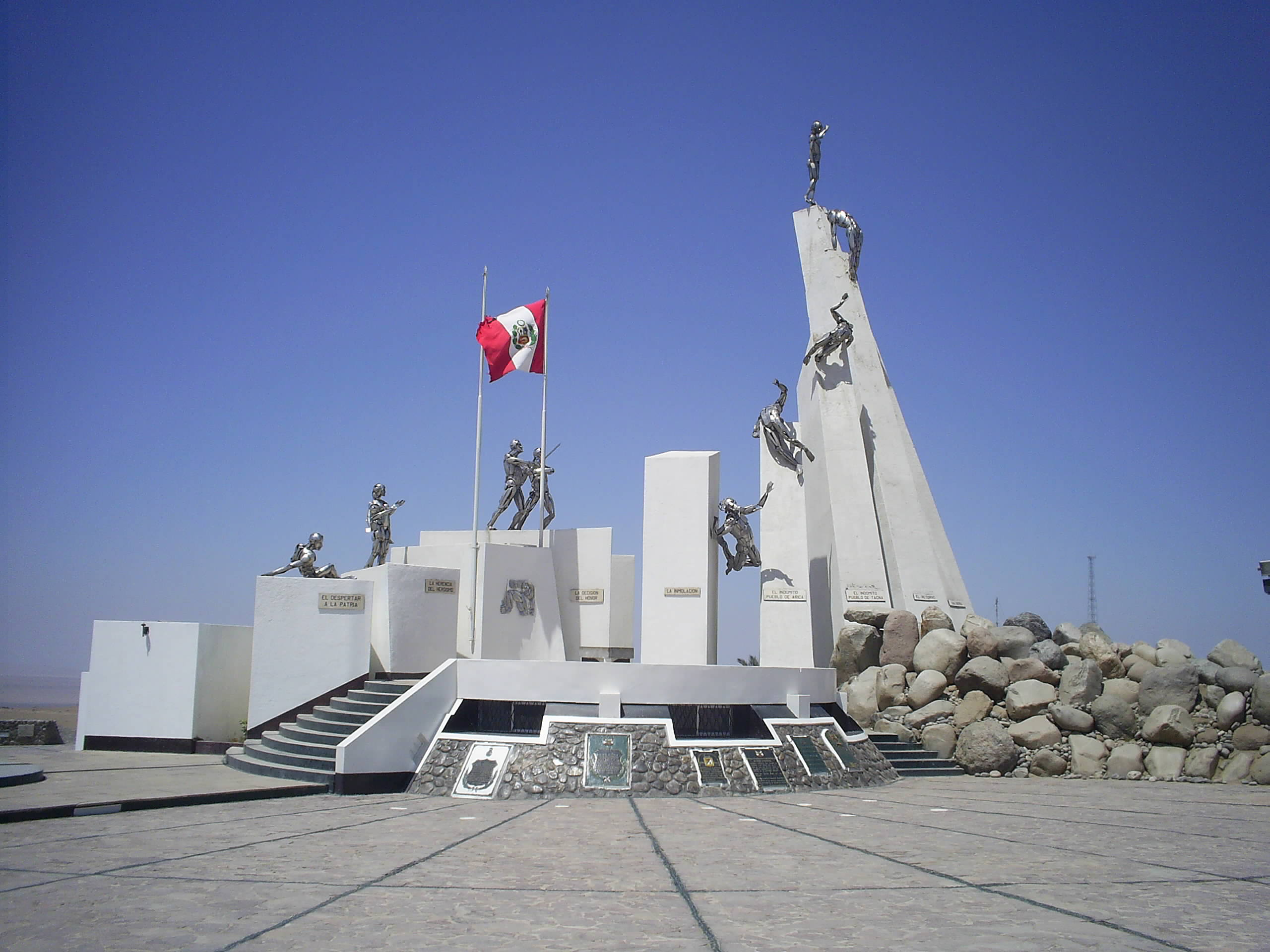
Alto de la Alianza Museum in Tacna.

On 26 January 2007, Peru's government issued a protest against Chile's demarcation of the coastal frontier that the two countries share. Peruvian President Alan García recalled his ambassador to Chile, Hugo Otero, to Lima to consult about the controversy over the maritime boundary the two countries share. According to the Peruvian Foreign Ministry, the Chilean legislatures endorsed a plan regarding the Arica and Parinacota region which did not comply with the established demarcation of the border. They alleged that the proposed Chilean law included an assertion of sovereignty over 19,000 square metres of land in Peru's Department of Tacna.

According to the Peruvian Foreign Ministry, Chile had defined a new region "without respecting the Concordia demarcation." The Peruvian government maintained that the dispute over the Chilean plan is part of an ongoing maritime dispute whereby Chile had tried to use the demarcation process to extend its maritime frontier. Over the past 50 years, Peru has maintained claims over roughly 40,000 square kilometers of ocean territory. The Chilean government asserted that the region in dispute is not a coastal site named Concordia, but instead refers to boundary stone No. 1, which is located to the northeast and 200 meters inland.

Given that the proposed Chilean law did not recognize the borderline established by both nations in the 1929 agreement, Peru lodged diplomatic protests with Chile. In the complex territorial dispute, Chile was asserting the border near the Pacific Ocean to fit in the geographical parallel, which Lima asserted would cut off at least 19,000 square metres of the Peruvian territory.

A possible border dispute was averted when the Chilean Constitutional Court ruled on the issue on 26 January 2007, striking down the legislation. Whilst agreeing with the court's ruling, the Chilean government reiterated its stance that the maritime borders between the two nations were not in question and had been formally approved by the international community.

On 28 January 2007, Peru's leading newspaper El Comercio reported that the President of the Cabinet of Ministers (Consejo de Ministros del Perú), Jorge del Castillo, expressed his grave concern over the pending maritime dispute with Chile.

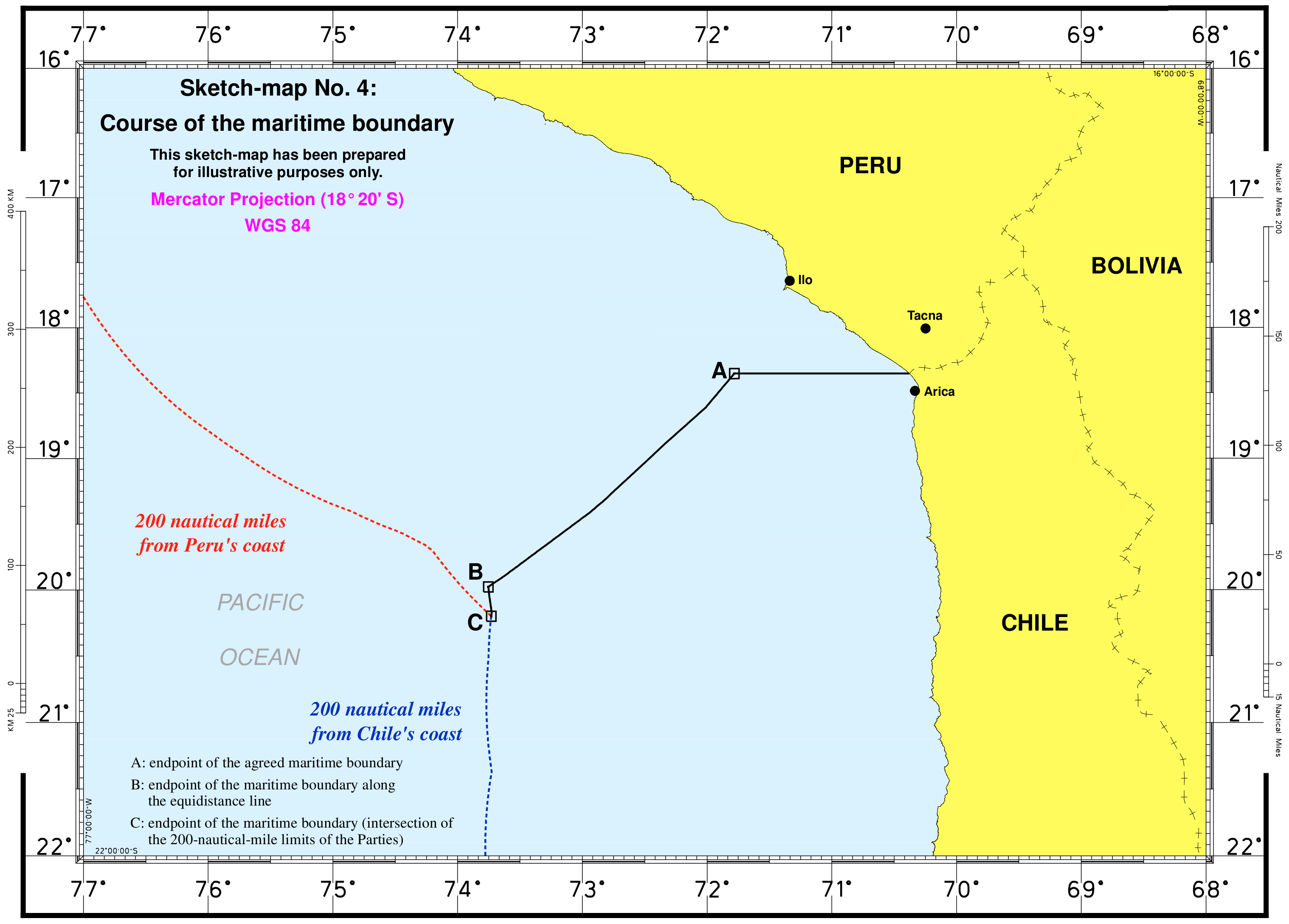
The maritime boundary between Chile and Peru as defined by the International Court of Justice on 27 January 2014

On 27 January 2014, in the final ruling of the International Court of Justice located in The Hague, Peru gained some maritime territory. The maritime boundary extends only to 80 nautical miles (150 km) off of the coast. From that point, the new border runs in a southwesterly direction to a point that is 200 nmi (370 km) equidistant from the coast of the two countries. Under the ruling, Chile lost control over part of its formerly claimed maritime territory and gave additional maritime territory to Peru.

From the 27 January 2014 court press release:

The Court concludes that the maritime boundary between the Parties starts at the intersection of the parallel of latitude passing through Boundary Marker No. 1 with the low-water line, and extends for 80 nmi (150 km) along that parallel of latitude to Point A. From this point, the maritime boundary runs along the equidistance line to Point B, and then along the 200 nmi (370 km) limit measured from the Chilean baselines to Point C. In view of the circumstances of the case, the Court has defined the course of the maritime boundary between the Parties without determining the precise geographical co-ordinates.

== Geography ==
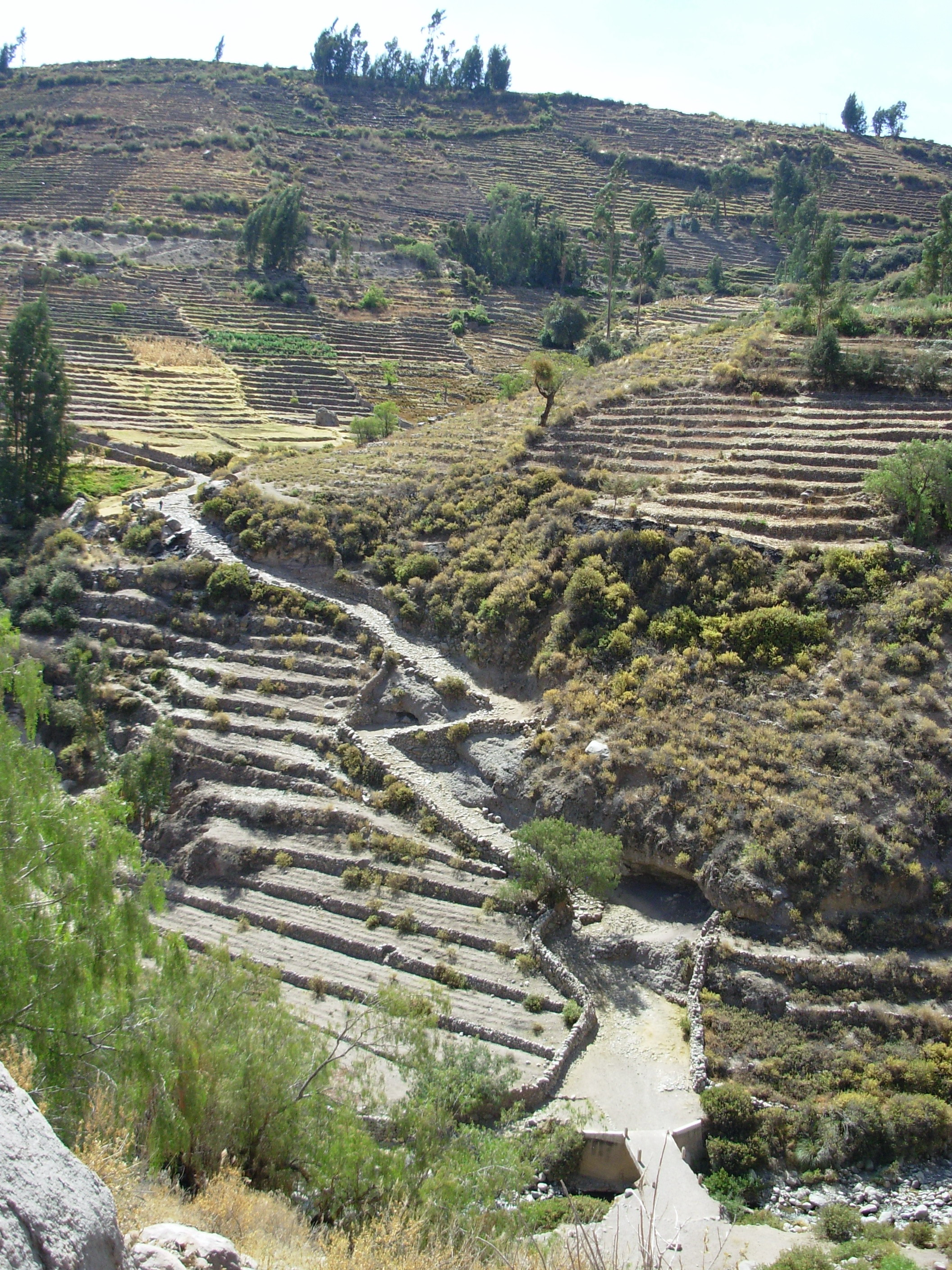
Inca Trail and terraces in Tarata

The department of Tacna has borders with the Pacific Ocean on the west, the department of Moquegua on the north, the department of Puno on the northeast, the Bolivian La Paz Department on the east, and the Arica-Parinacota Region of Chile on the south. The border between the Tacna Region and Chile is known as La Línea de la Concordia.

The region is located below the Titicaca plateau and has a diverse geography, including volcanoes, deserts, and mountainous zones, from which arise rivers that cross over the punas and the plateaus, thus forming the hydrographical system of this zone. The region is small in size but has a significant mining and agriculture potential. It has various climates and diverse production.

=== Climate ===
This area has a high level of sunshine year round due to its stable descending air and high pressure. According to the Köppen Climate Classification system, Tacna has a desert climate, abbreviated "Bwh" on climate maps.

== Politics ==
=== Subdivisions ===
Map of provinces

The department is divided into four provinces, themselves constituted by a total of 26 districts. These provinces (and their capitals) are as follows:

- Candarave (Candarave)
- Jorge Basadre (Locumba)
- Tacna (Tacna)
- Tarata (Tarata)

== Economy ==
Tacna's primary income earner is copper mining. Agriculturally, Tacna produces 53.15% of the whole olive crop in Peru. It also produces maize, potatoes, wheat, cotton, oregano, alfalfa, and grapevine (for the production of wine and pisco). It also has a sizable herd of dairy cattle and lamb.

In addition to mining and agriculture, fishing is also important, as Tacna's offshore region is abundant in fish resources.

== Culture ==
=== Gastronomy ===
Tacna offers visitors colorful dishes exquisitely combined and abundantly served. The picante a la Tacneña and patazca Tacneña belong to this region. Corn and cheese, chicharrones with toasted corn, cuy, or guinea pig chactado, corn cake with peanuts and raisins, baked pork, grilled lamb, are also local specialties. To drink, Tacna has macerated Brussels apricot, frutilla or tumbo, and wines produced in the local vineyards.

=== Festivities ===
Carnivals. They are celebrated in different towns and villages with typical local dances that can go on for entire days and nights.

- April – the Corn and Potato Festival in Tacna.
- 26 May – the Anniversary of the Battle of Alto de la Alianza.
- 7 June – the Anniversary of the Battle of Arica.
- 20 June – Day to remember the tacneño patriot Francisco Antonio de Zela.
- 23 June – Night of San Juan.
- 28 August – Procesión de la Bandera. A civic procession act in which women of Tacna carry the red and white Peruvian flag through the streets of the city. Later, various associations, groups of students, and the armed and police forces take part in a parade that ends in the main square, where the Arch of the Heroes is located. It is part of a week that celebrates the reincorporation of Tacna into Peruvian territory. Simultaneously, a fair for farm and livestock products, industrial goods, and handicrafts takes place.
