= Basilica and Convent of San Francisco, Arequipa =

Cultural heritage site in Peru

Basilica and Convent of San Francisco de Arequipa
- Basílica y Convento de San Francisco de Arequipa
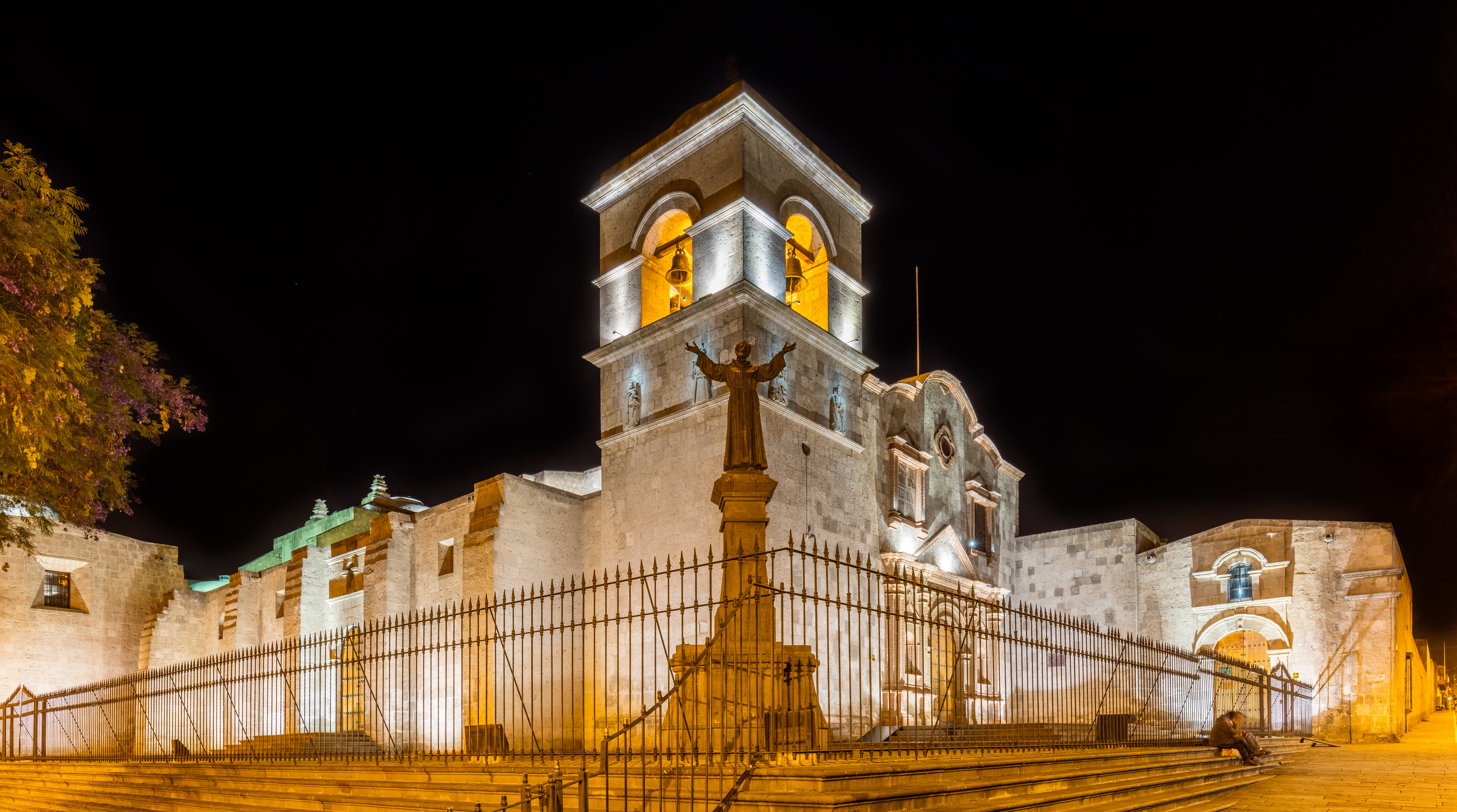
- Basilica and Convent of San Francisco de Arequipa
- 16°23′43.00″S 71°32′05.00″W
- Location: Arequipa, Peru
- Denomination: Catholic

History
- Status: Basilica
- Dedication: Saint Francis

Architecture
- Groundbreaking: 1569
- Completed: Late 16th century

UNESCO World Heritage Site
- Part of: Historic Centre of Arequipa
- Criteria: Cultural: i, iv
- Reference: 1016
- Inscription: 2000 (24th Session)
- Area: Latin America and the Caribbean

Cultural Heritage of Peru
- Official name: Iglesia y Convento de San Francisco
- Type: Immovable tangible
- Criteria: Monument
- Designated: 16 April 1958; 68 years ago
- Legal basis: R.S. Nº 132-1958-ED

The Basilica and Convent of San Francisco is a church and heritage site in the historic center of Arequipa, Peru.

It is characterized by its tuff walls and brick vault with a single nave, in addition to its Andean Baroque style.

The church of San Francisco is one of the largest in the city of Arequipa.

It has a site museum, interesting art gallery and a library with more than 20 thousand volumes.

== History ==
The Franciscan fathers arrived in Arequipa in 1551. The following year they founded their convent on the land donated by the rich encomendero and merchant Don Lucas Martínez Begazo, with Father Fraile Alfonso Rincón taking charge of the work. The church stands poorly and provisionally, since the refectory used to be in the place of the first church. The residents of Arequipa request the construction of a temple for the Franciscans, for which they offer donations and alms. In 1569 a contract is signed with the architect Gaspar Báez and the work begins immediately, its walls are made of tuff and its brick vaults of a single nave like all the churches of Arequipa, later the presbytery is added and finally the collateral naves at the expense of the canon Don Ignacio Gregorio de Adriazola.

== Gallery ==
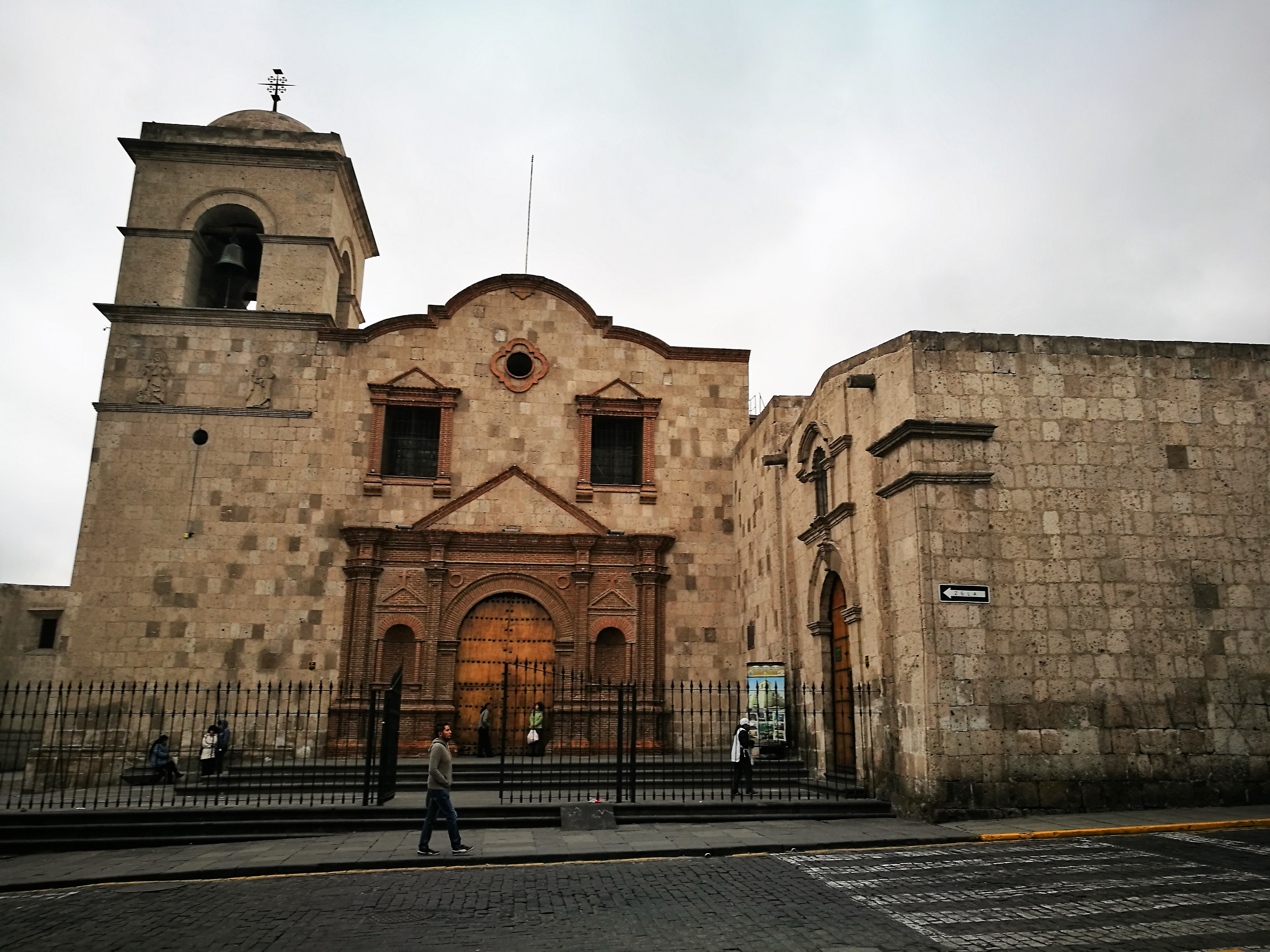
Main portal

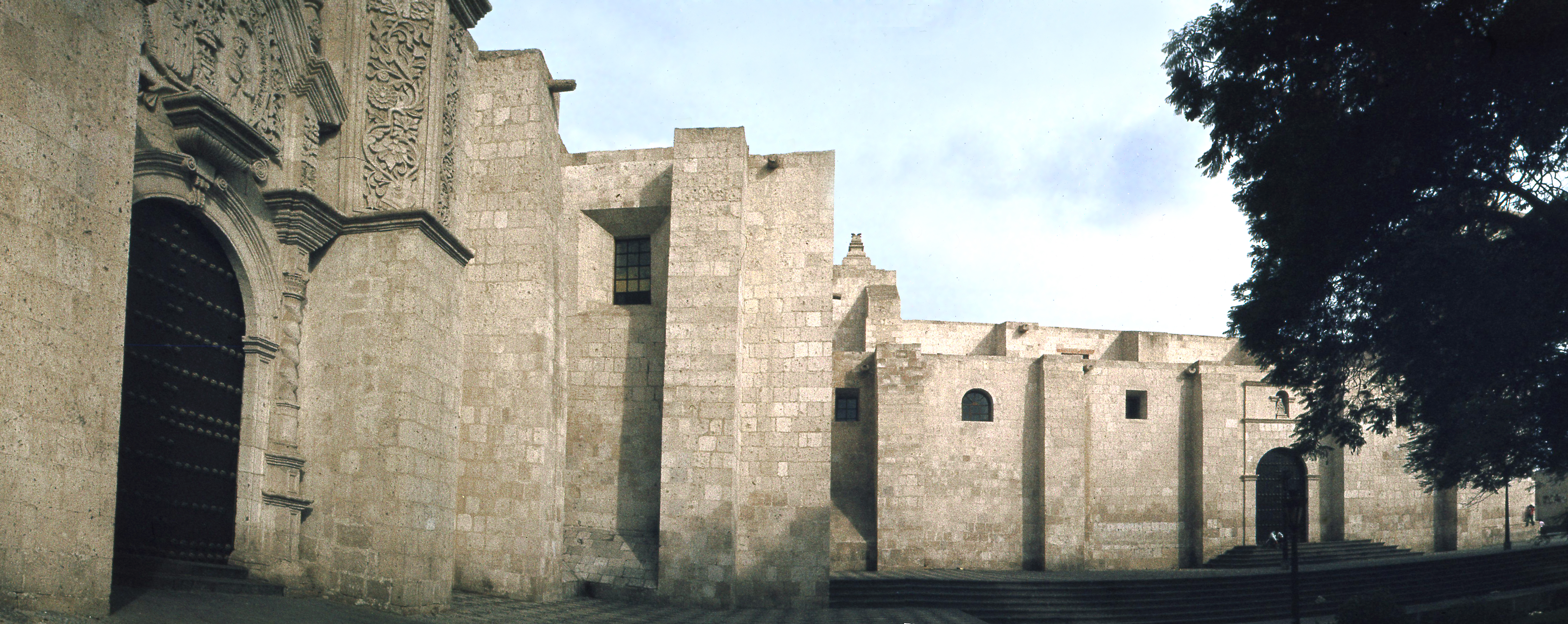
Side portals

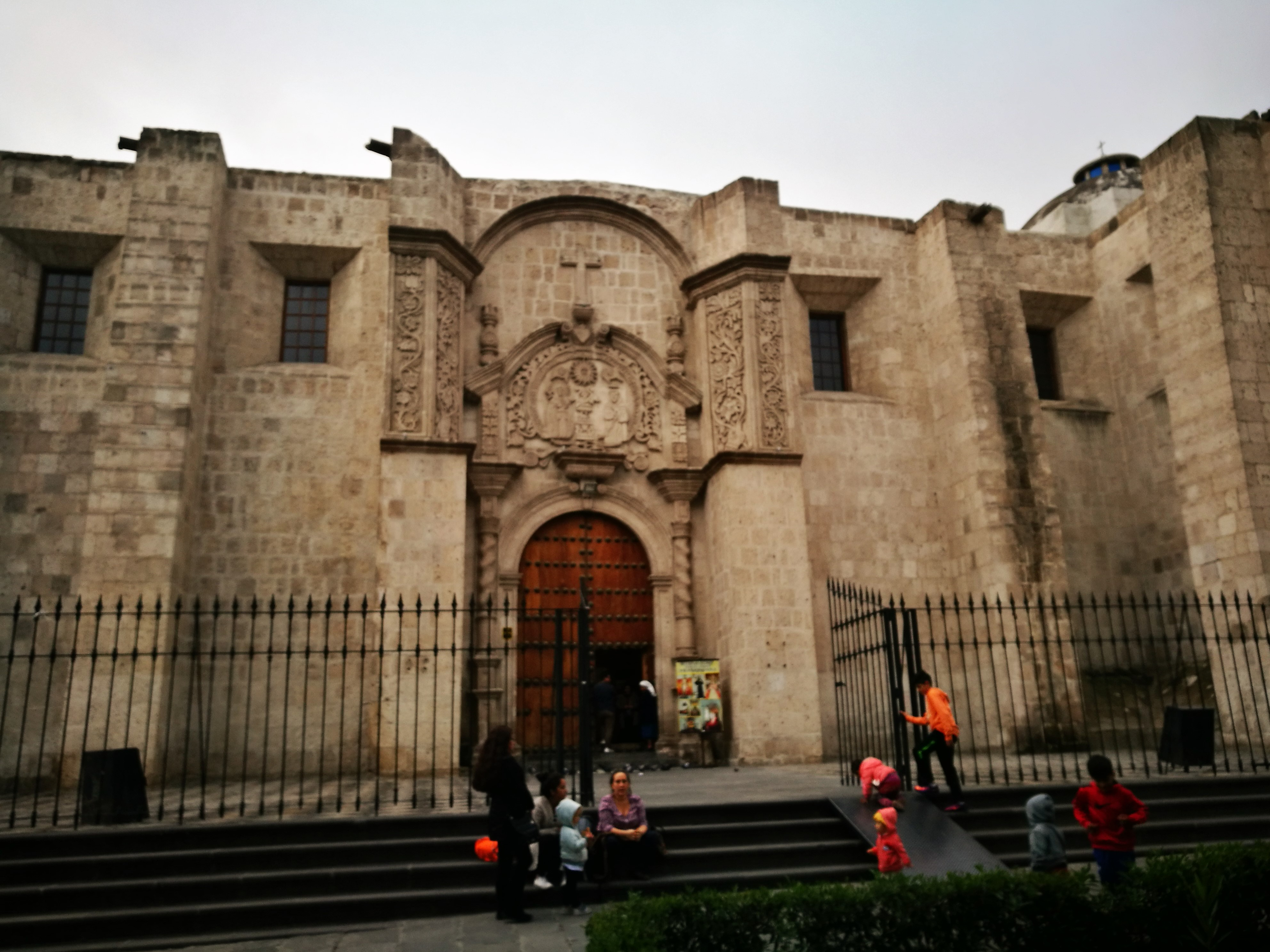
Side portal

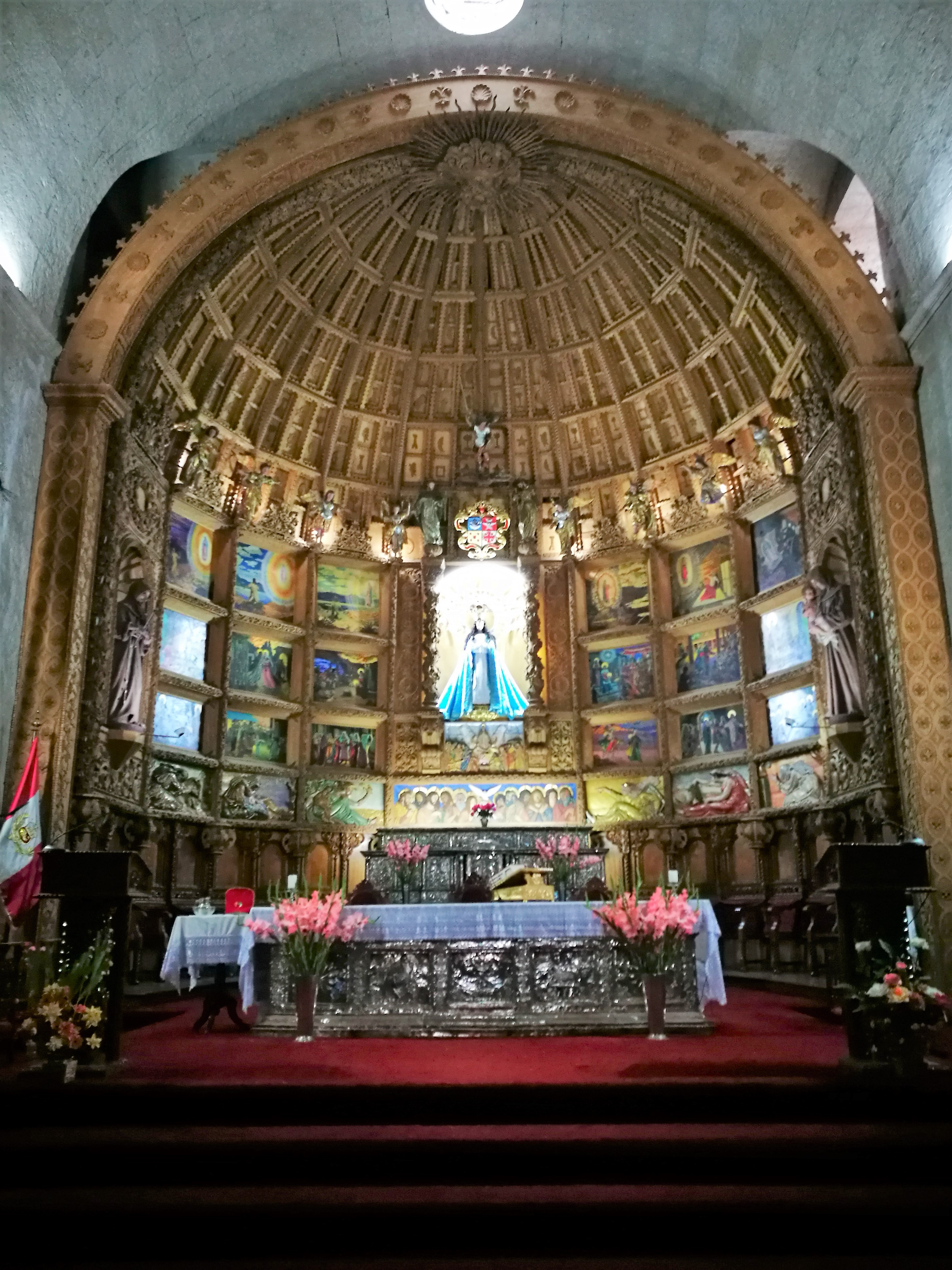
Main altar

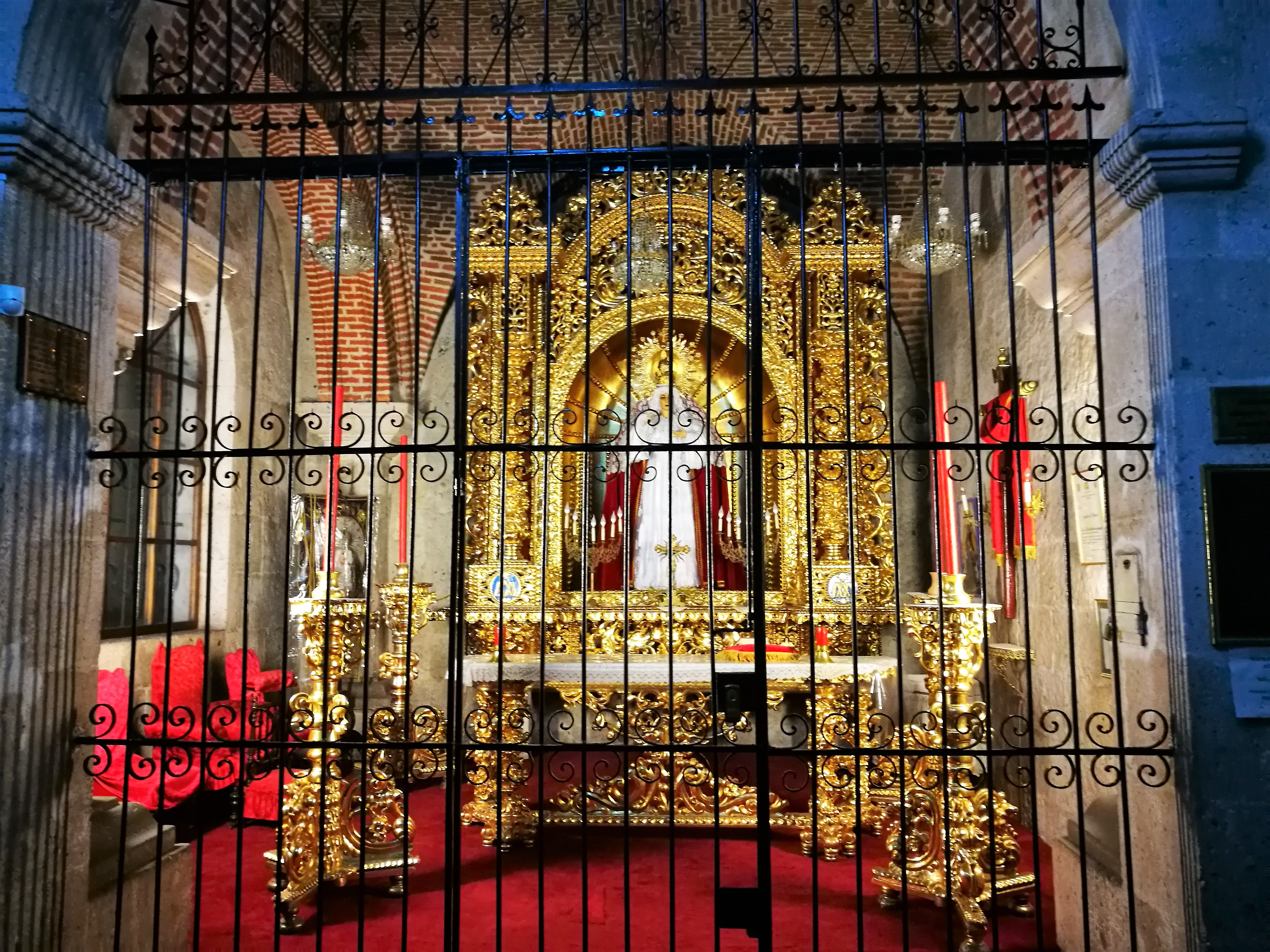
Side chapel

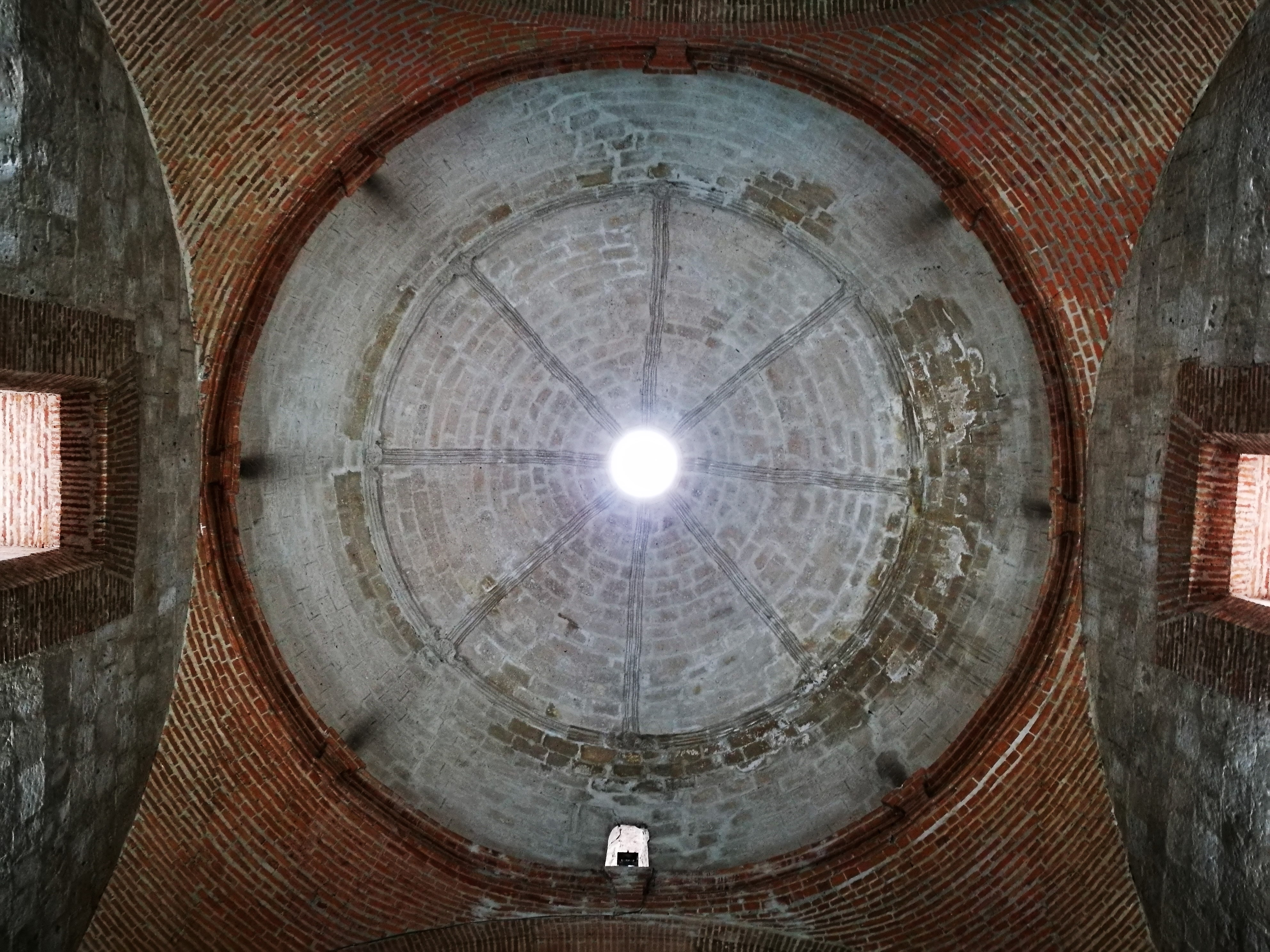
Dome

== See also ==
- List of colonial buildings in Arequipa
