= Andean Baroque =

Artistic and architectural movement

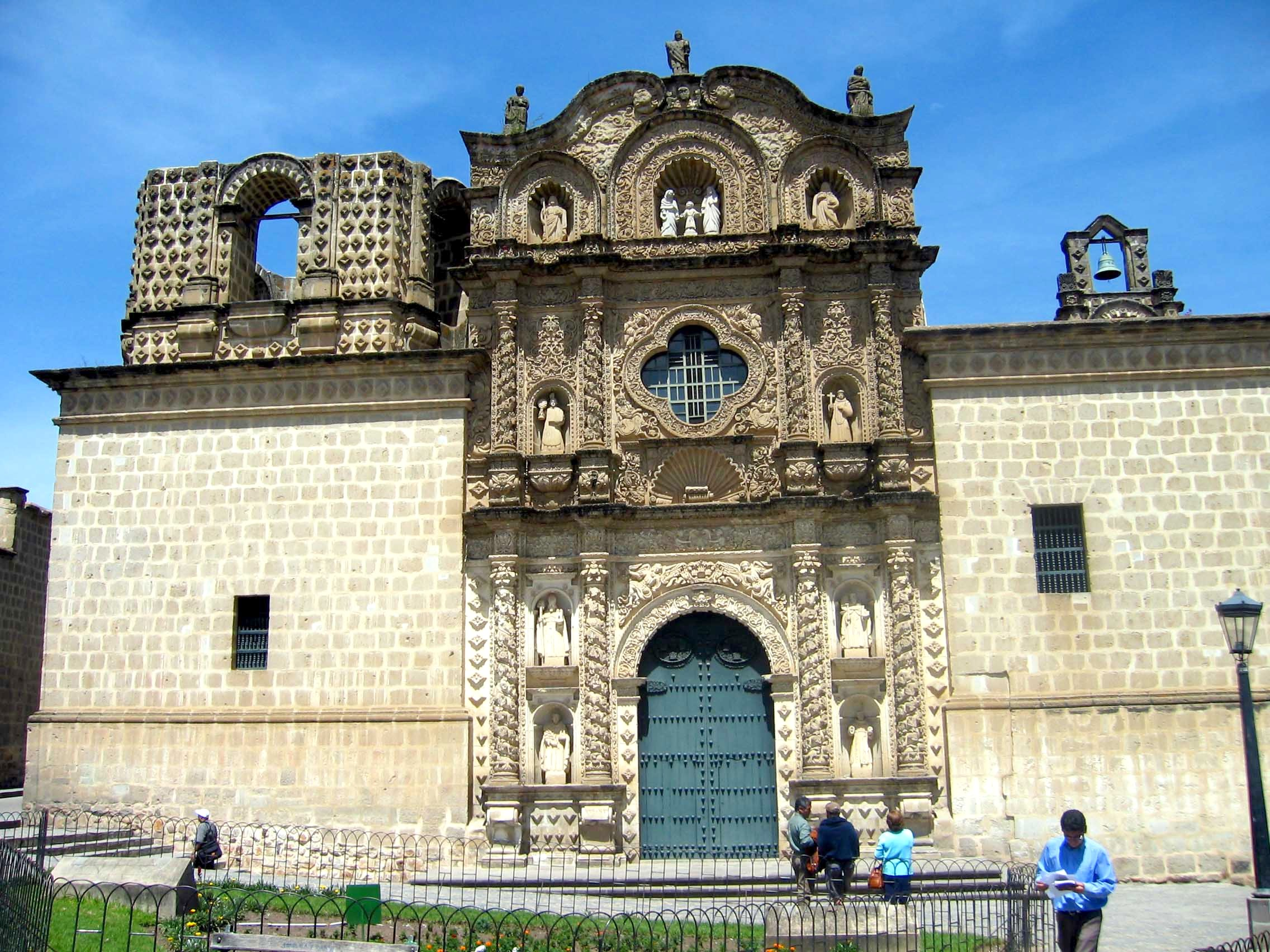
Iglesia Belén. Baroque Architecture of Cajamarca

Andean Baroque (Spanish: Barroco andino or arquitectura mestiza) is an artistic movement that appeared in colonial Peru between 1680 and 1780. It is located geographically between Arequipa and Lake Titicaca in what is now Peru, where rules over the highlands and spreads over the entire altiplano. From the Portuguese word barrueco meaning impure, mottled, flamboyant, daring, the most striking example of Andean Baroque art is in religious architecture, where criollo and indigenous craftsmen together gave it a unique character, as happened in the New Spanish Baroque.

== Origin ==
The first of the Baroque architecture in the Viceroyalty of Peru in 1630 and developed on the Spanish model until the late 17th century. From 1690 differences appear in some regions.

== Decorative elements ==
The originality of this style lies in the varied decoration, and whose motives respond to four basic types:

- tropical flora and fauna
- Manneristic motifs as sirens, masks, etc.
- American motifs: sun, moon, mountain lions, etc.
- Pre-Renaissance Christian elements

The mermaid appears in the churches bordering the Lake Titicaca and although it is an item from the classical antiquity, remember the Indigenous tradition of two fishes women who seduced the god Tunupa.

== Regional variants ==
=== Arequipa ===
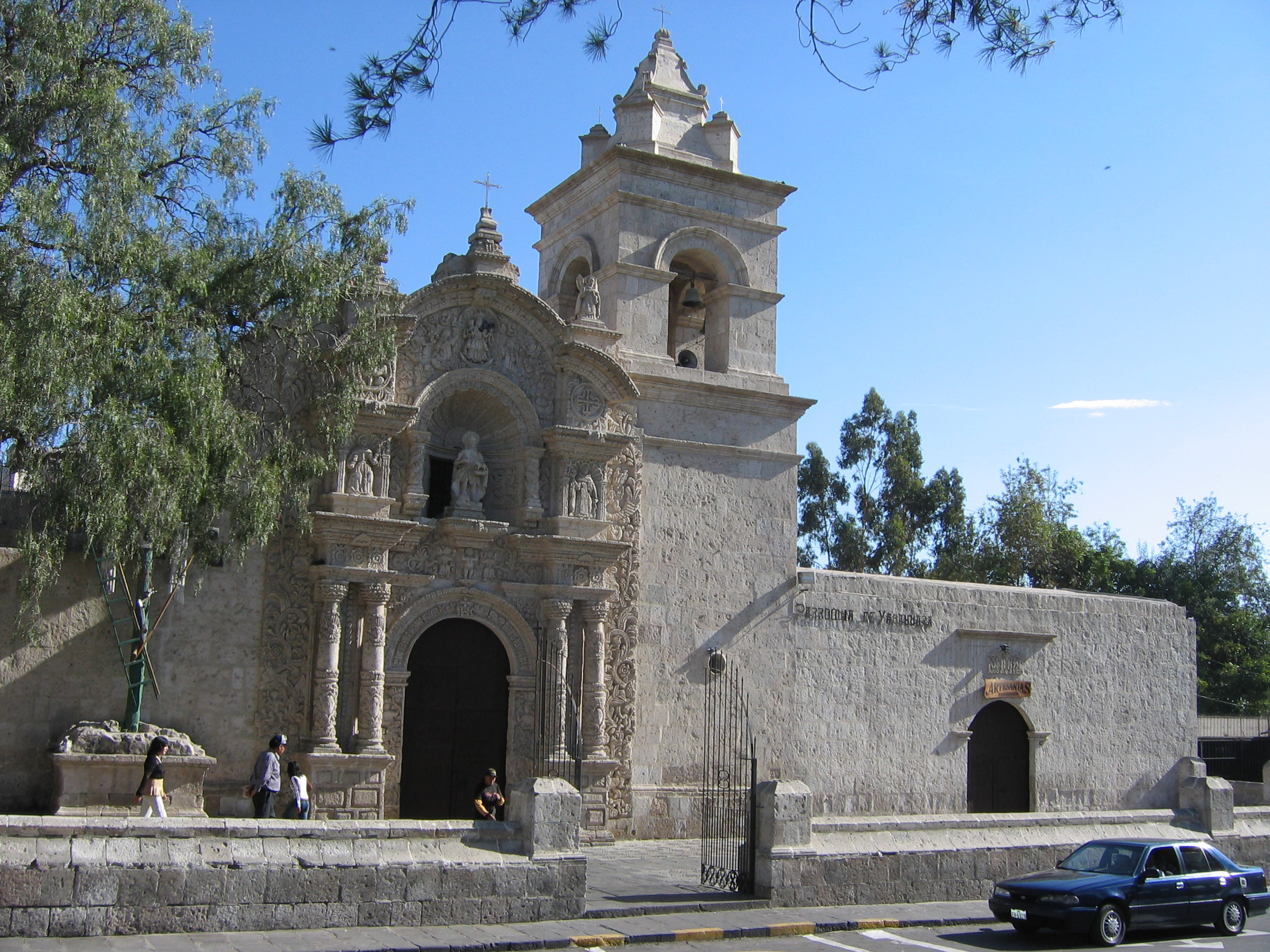
San Juan Bautista Church in Yanahuara District.

In Arequipa, the key building of Mestizo architecture is the church of la Compañía by the architect Gaspar Báez built in 1578.

=== Quito Baroque ===
The extension of the Quito Baroque cover the territories of the former Royal Audiencia of Quito in Spanish colonial times. Especially the Altiplano of Quito and the Andes from Pasto in Colombia to Cajamarca in Peru. Represented in the arts called "Quito School" which was characterized by a high proportion of indigenous Kichwas representations.

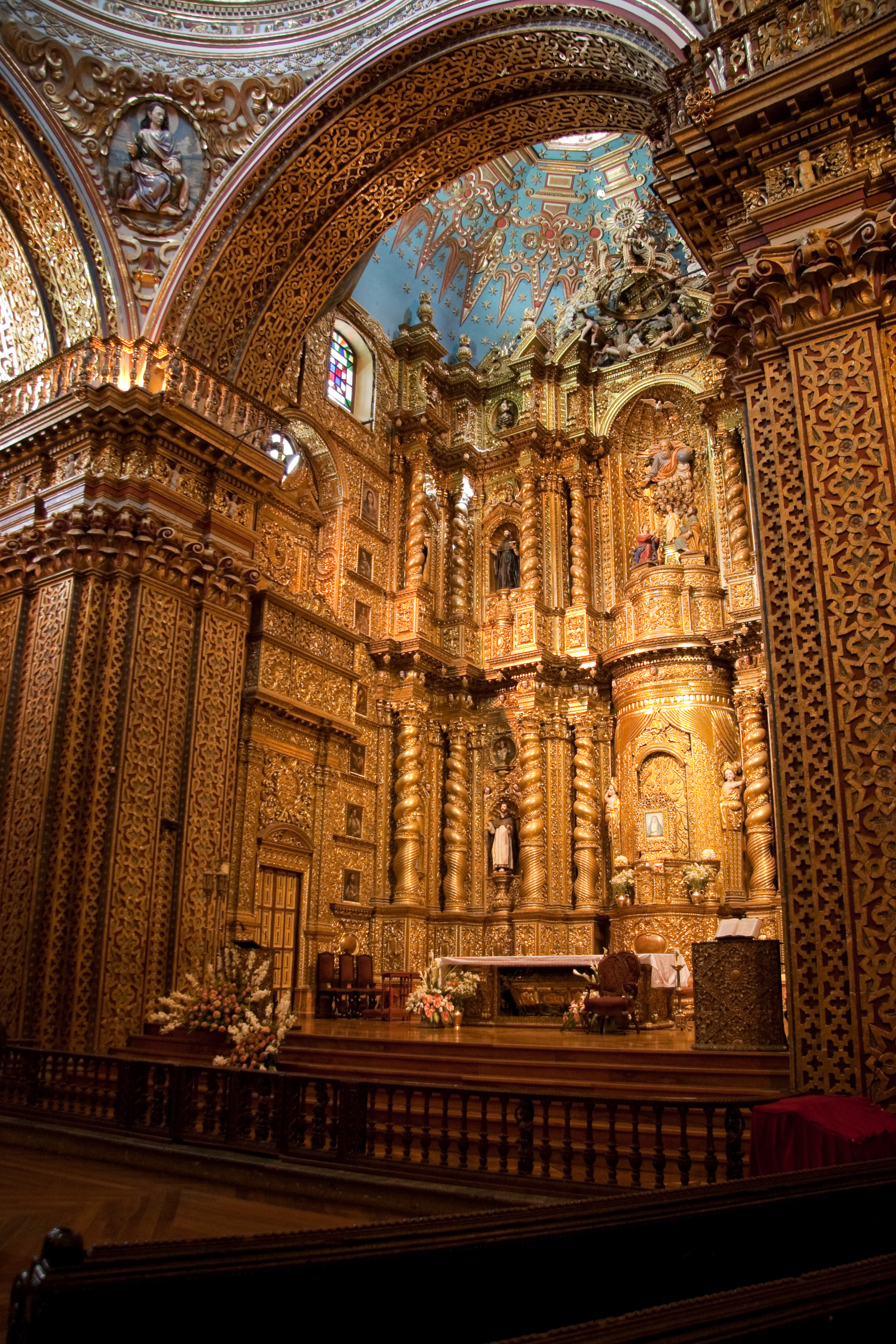
Interior of the Church of la Compañía de Jesús, Quito

Features that characterize the indigenous roots in Andean Quito art are:

- There is a "quiteanization" of the characters, many have mixed features and local attire
- Indigenous ancestral customs often appear;
- The scenes are located in the ambiance of the Andean landscape, its cities, its architecture;
- There is a presence of local wildlife (llamas instead of horses and camels, guinea pig in place of the Paschal Lamb, monkeys, opossums, tapirs, cats, along with classic sheep of the shepherds, etc..), And native flora is found in garlands, embroidery, inlays, silver, carvings, etc..) as well as the adoption of vernacular plant replacing the traditional iconography of European; in sculpture and painting are present characters and customs characteristic of the environment; the executor of the work art is the local craftsman of ancient artistic tradition itself, there is an adoption of "naturalization" of European saints, for example, Poland's San Jacinto is called San Jacinto of Yaguachi.

Baroque architecture in Quito stands the Church of San Francisco, the compañía de Jesús, the Cathedral of Quito, among others.

=== Churches of the Colca Valley ===
In the province of Cailloma is the valley of Collaguas evangelized by the Franciscans, highlights several Catholic churches located in the towns of Yanque (Church of the Immaculate Conception of Yanque) Coporaque, Cabanaconde, Chivay, Madrigal and Silvayo.

=== Lake Titicaca and El Collao ===
The indigenous groups that inhabit the region are the Kollas and Lupacas in present Peruvian territory and Omasuyos and Pacajes on Bolivian. All were subject to the Mita de Potosí and periodically migrated to the valleys and coastal lowlands.

The Baroque of Arequipa and Potosí is a conjunction in this region with a strong Pre-Columbian flavor. The Puno Cathedral picks iconographic elements as mermaids, pumas, papayas and a monkey and even the charango. Lake Titicaca was named in honor of the puma, Titi, in Aymara, because of its shape.

In the region of Lupacas rise the three groups of baroque churches: Juli, Pomata and Zepita.

Juli has been the great Jesuit missionary center of the altiplano, had four churches: San Juan de Letrán, Santa Cruz de Jerusalén, Nuestra Señora de la Asunción and San Pedro Mártir.

The Dominicans possessed the Pomata Sanctuary where they venerate Our Lady of the Rosary, the most famous of this region after the Basilica of Our Lady of Copacabana who was in charge of the Augustinians. The church of St. James of Pomata marks the culmination of the Mestizo style.

== Gallery ==
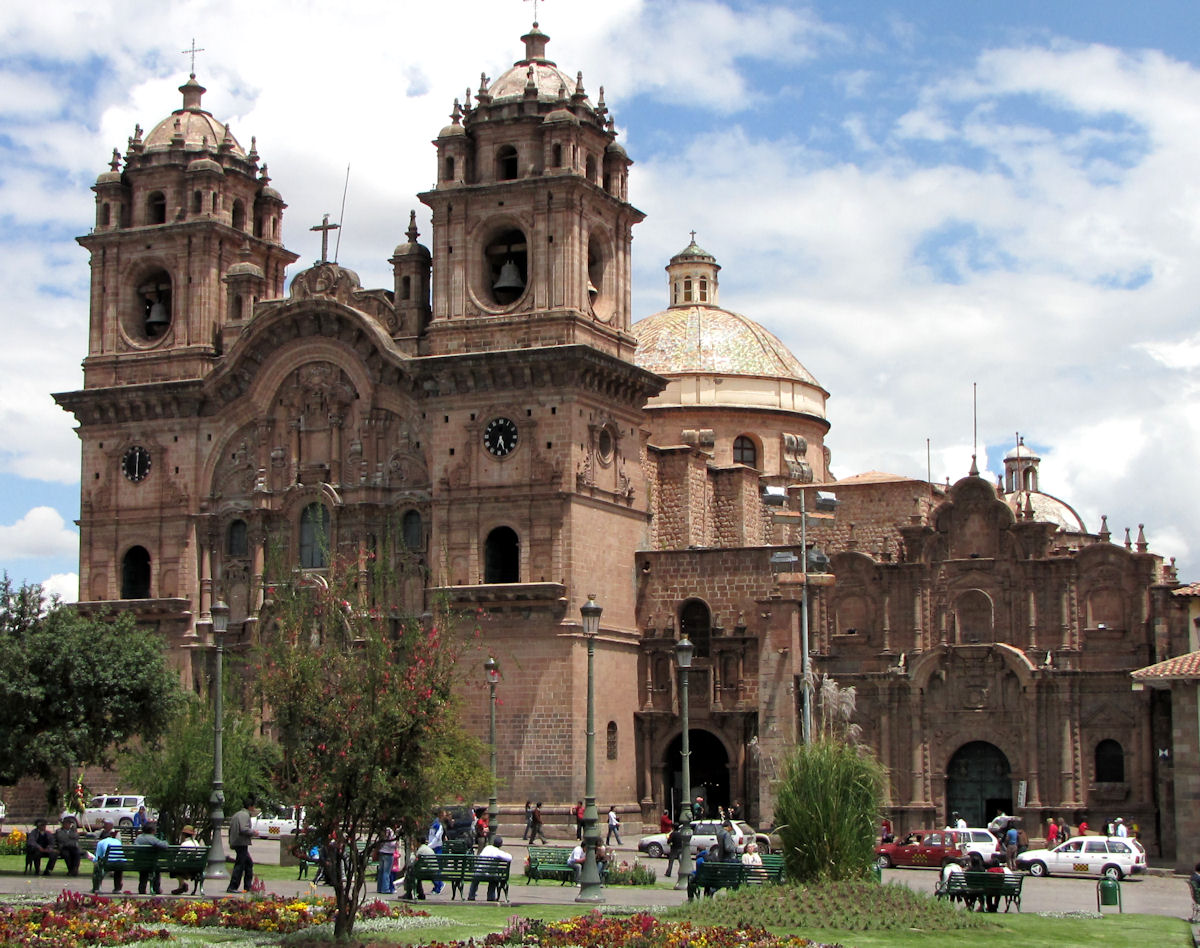
Iglesia de la Compañía de Jesús, Cusco.

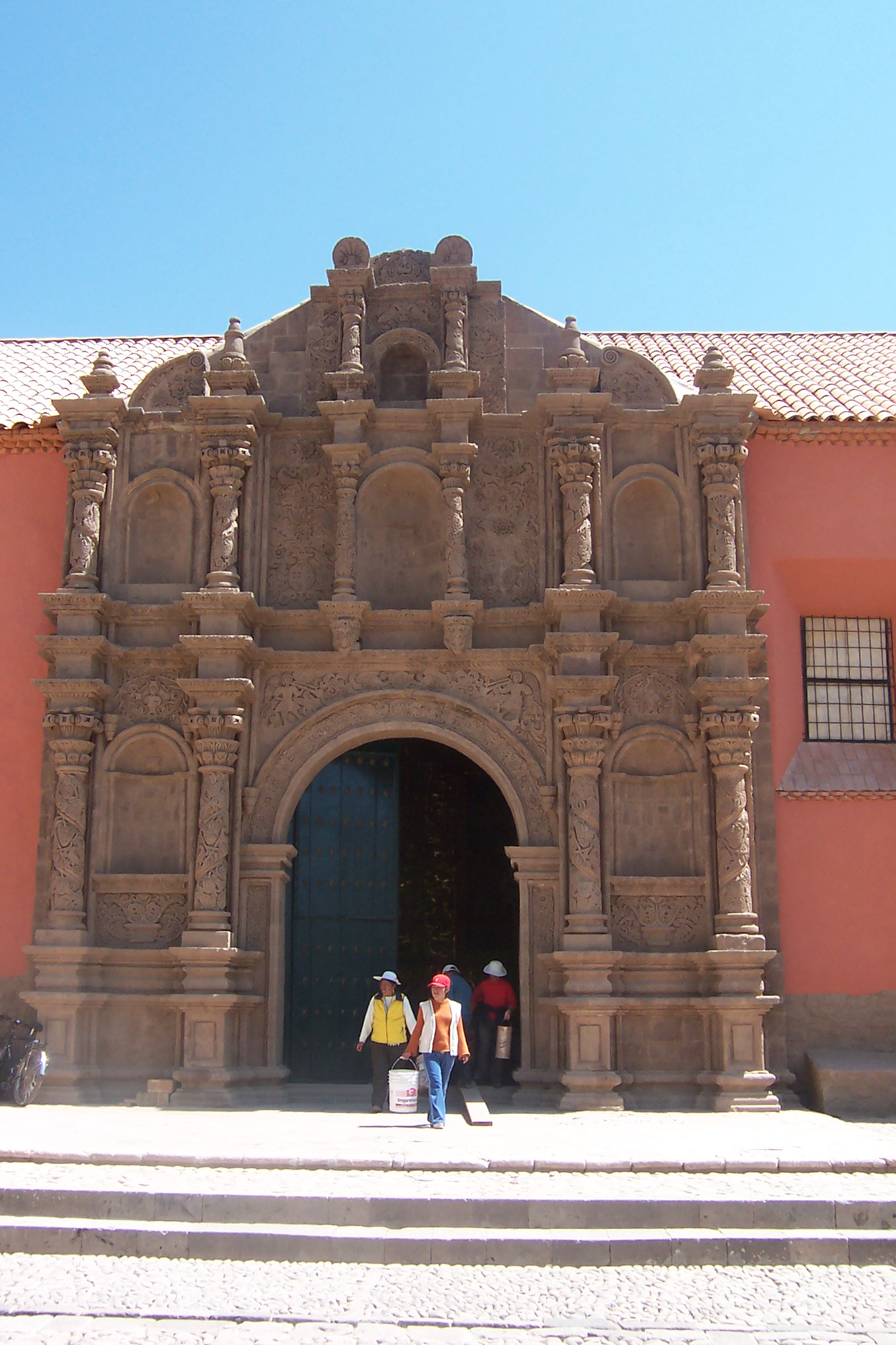
Church of San Juan de Letrán in Juli.

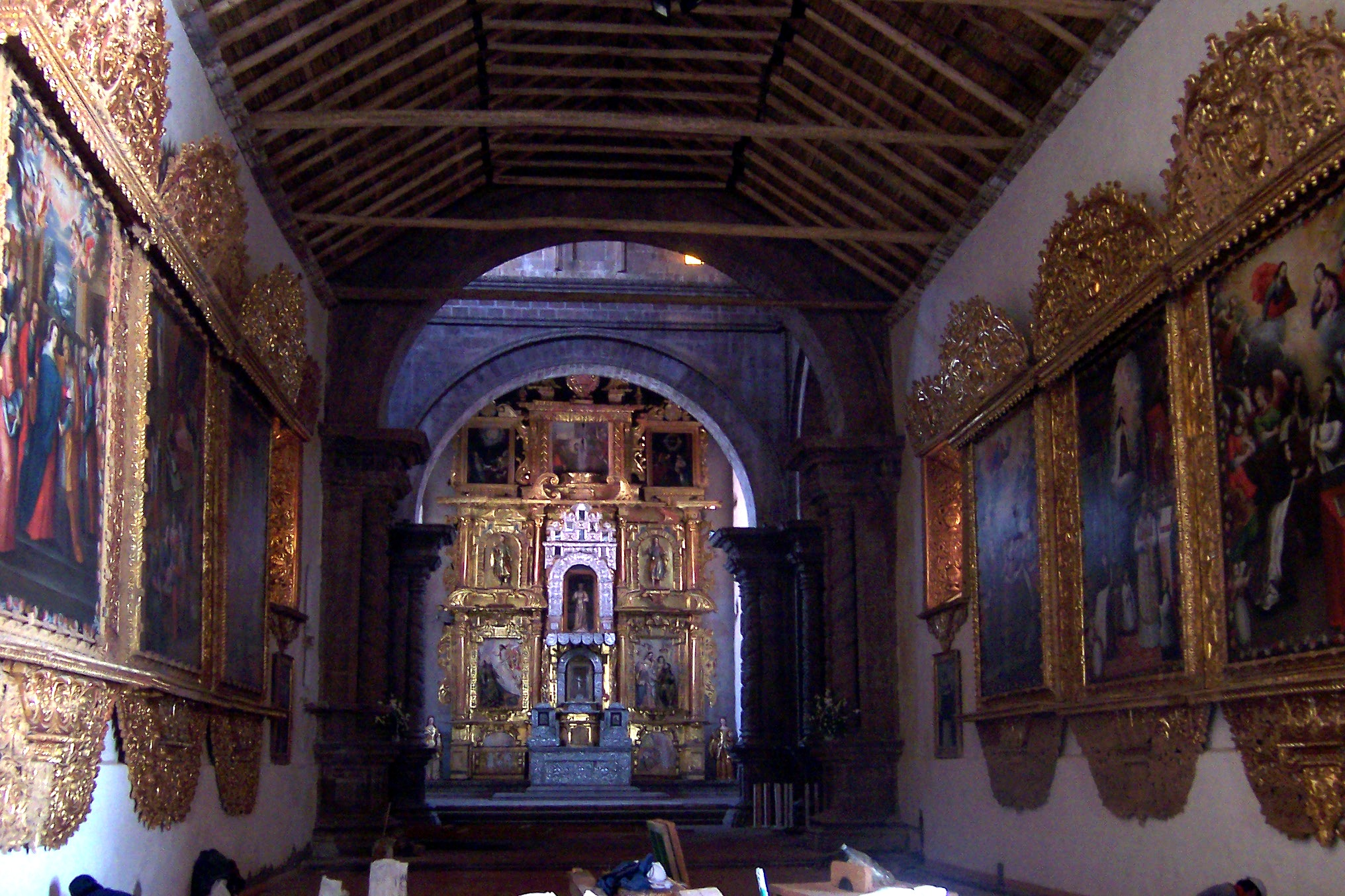
Altar of the Church of San Juan de Letrán in Juli.

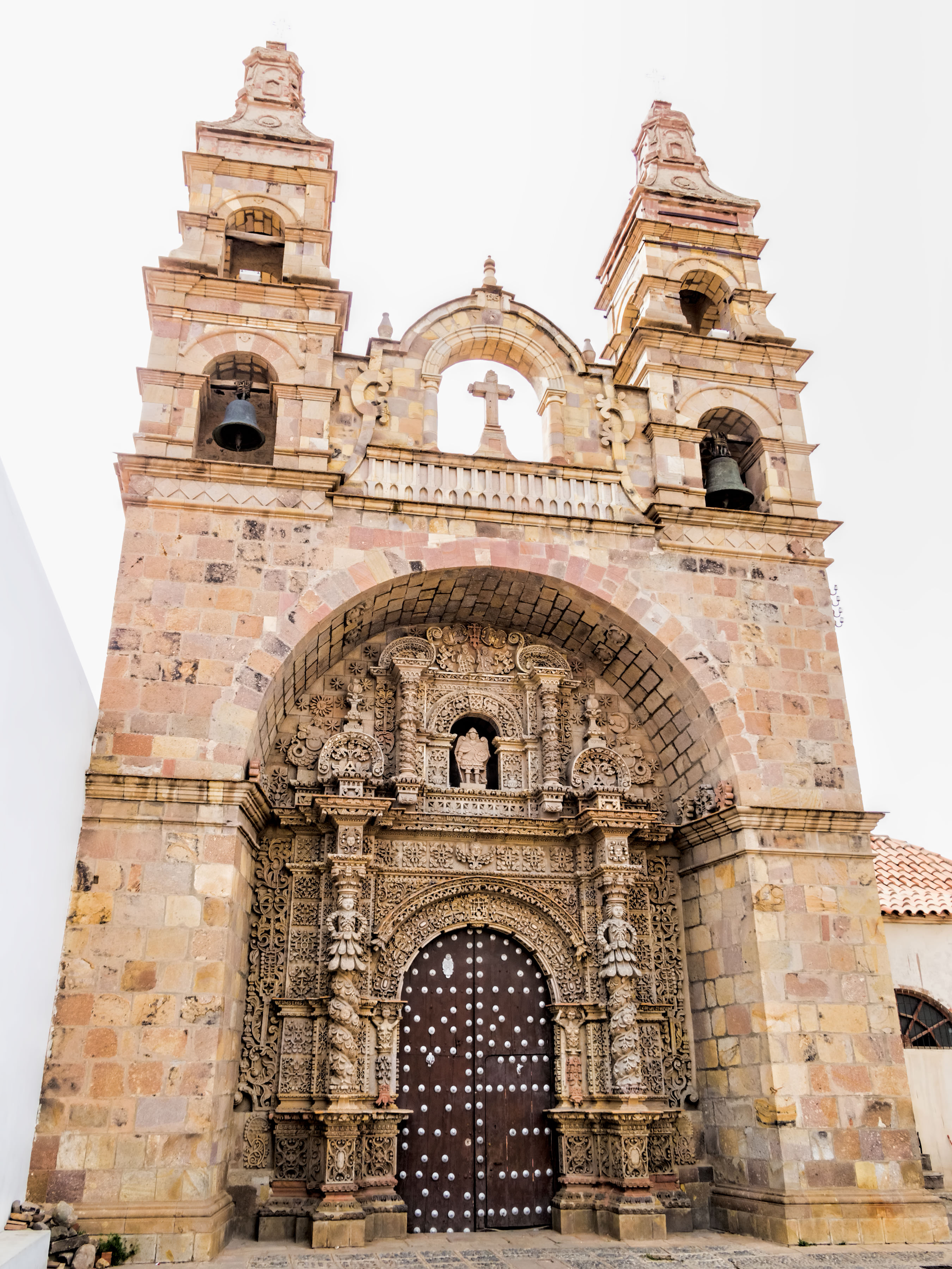
Church of San Lorenzo de Carangas in Potosí, Bolivia

== See also ==
- Peruvian colonial architecture
- Cusco School
- Churches of Chiloé
