= Uma Jalsu (Puno) =

Mountain in Peru

- Location within Peru

Highest point
- Elevation: 5,000 m (16,000 ft)
- Coordinates: 17°10′42″S 69°53′33″W

Geography
- Location: Peru, Puno Region, El Collao Province
- Parent range: Andes

Uma Jalsu (Aymara for spring, source, Hispanicized spelling Humajalso) is a mountain in the Andes of southern Peru, about 5,000 m (16,000 ft) high. It is located in the Puno Region, El Collao Province, Capazo District. Uma Jalsu lies west of the mountain Jiwaña and southeast of Wila Chunkara. It lies at a plain named Jiwaña Pampa (Jihuaña Pampa). The Jiwaña River originates near the mountain. It flows through the plain before it reaches the Mawri River (Mauri).
