= Juli District =

Coordinates: 16.2135°S 69.4586°W

Juli Chulli
- District
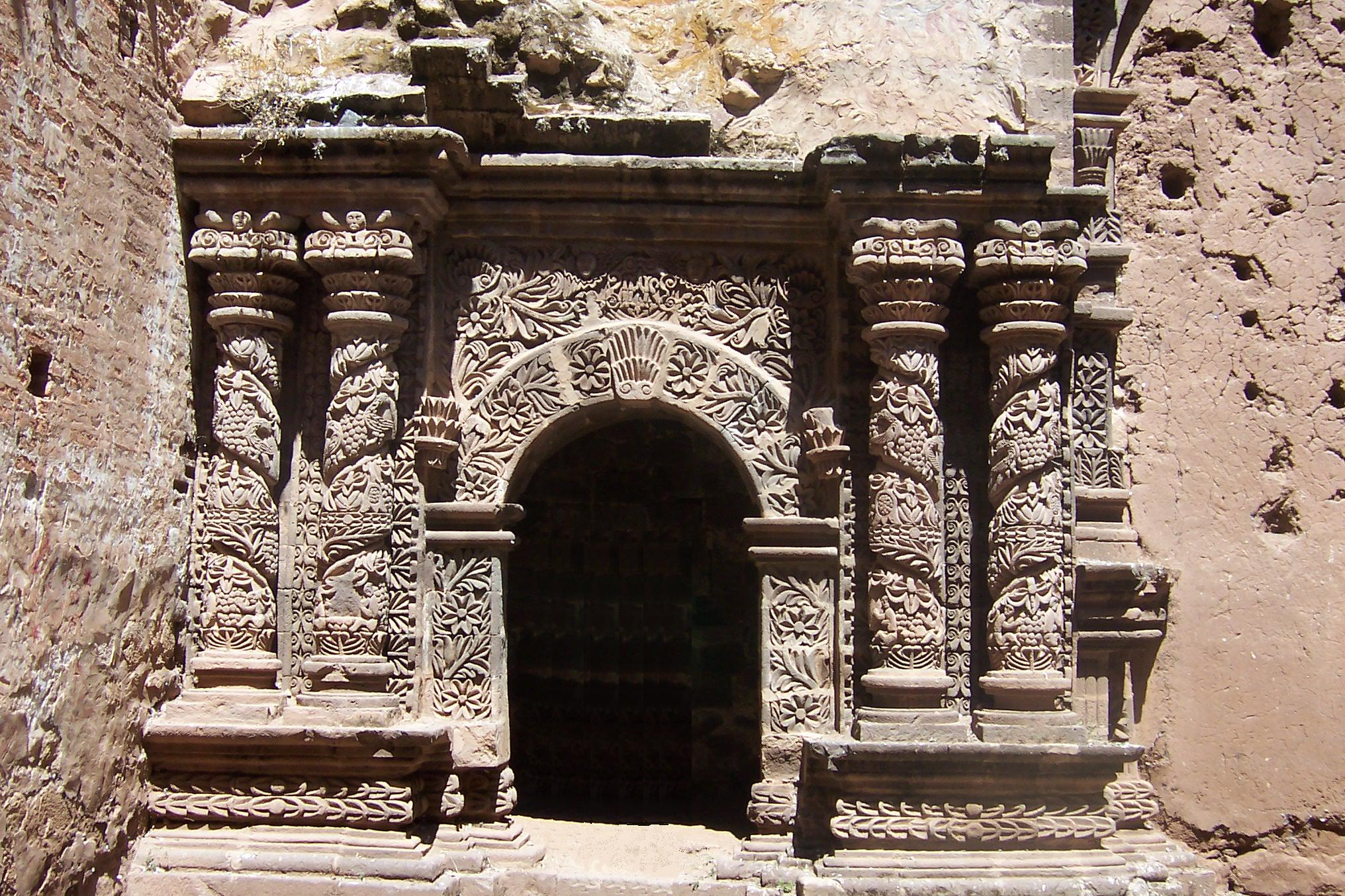
- Portal of the Santa Cruz church in Juli
- Interactive map of Juli
- Country: Peru
- Region: Puno
- Province: Chucuito
- Capital: Juli

Government
  - Mayor: Justo Apaza Delgado (2019–2022)

Area
  - Total: 720.38 km^{2} (278.14 sq mi)
- Elevation: 3,868 m (12,690 ft)

Population (2007 census)
  - Total: 23,741
  - Density: 32.956/km^{2} (85.356/sq mi)
- Time zone: UTC-5 (PET)
- UBIGEO: 210401

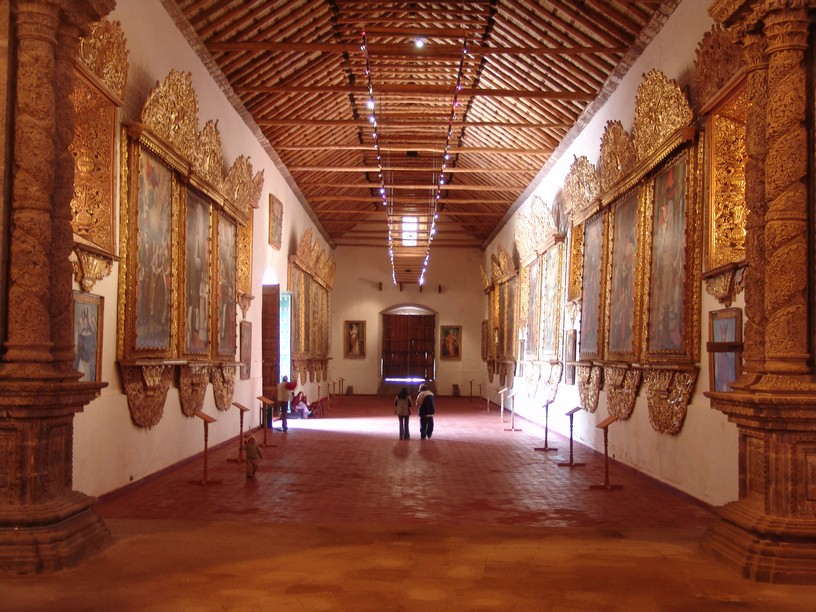
Interior view of St. John Church

Juli District is one of seven districts of the Chucuito Province in Puno Region, Peru.

== Geography ==
One of the highest peaks of the district is K'isini at approximately 4,600 m (15,100 ft). Other mountains are listed below:

- Jach'a Qala
- Jilarata
- Jinchupalla
- Kimsa
- Khawayuni
- Laramani
- Llallawa
- Pukara
- Sura Wiqu
- Wila Kunka

== History ==
Juli is mentioned as the third site where a printing press was established in the Americas, in 1612, following one in Mexico and another in Lima.

== Ethnic groups ==
The people in the district are mainly indigenous citizens of Aymara descent. Aymara is the language which the majority of the population (68.67%) learnt to speak in childhood, 30.56% of the residents started speaking using the Spanish language (2007 Peru Census).

== Climate ==
Climate data for Juli, elevation 3,830 m (12,570 ft), (1991–2020)
Month	Jan	Feb	Mar	Apr	May	Jun	Jul	Aug	Sep	Oct	Nov	Dec	Year
Mean daily maximum °C (°F)	14.0 (57.2)	14.1 (57.4)	14.1 (57.4)	14.3 (57.7)	13.8 (56.8)	12.9 (55.2)	12.8 (55.0)	13.3 (55.9)	14.0 (57.2)	14.8 (58.6)	15.3 (59.5)	14.8 (58.6)	14.0 (57.2)
Mean daily minimum °C (°F)	5.2 (41.4)	5.3 (41.5)	5.0 (41.0)	3.6 (38.5)	1.0 (33.8)	−0.6 (30.9)	−0.8 (30.6)	0.3 (32.5)	2.1 (35.8)	3.7 (38.7)	4.6 (40.3)	5.3 (41.5)	2.9 (37.2)
Average precipitation mm (inches)	215.8 (8.50)	182.2 (7.17)	157.2 (6.19)	50.2 (1.98)	11.6 (0.46)	5.3 (0.21)	7.3 (0.29)	14.2 (0.56)	23.6 (0.93)	45.0 (1.77)	49.7 (1.96)	123.4 (4.86)	885.5 (34.88)
Source: National Meteorology and Hydrology Service of Peru

== Authorities ==
=== Mayors ===
- 2011-2014: Juan Ludgerio Aguilar Olivera.
- 2007-2010: Eugenio Barbaito Constanza.

== Gallery ==
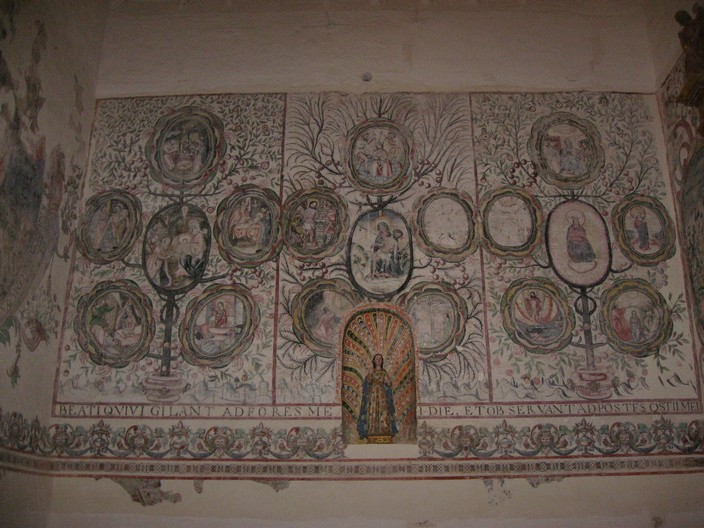
Mural paintings, Juli

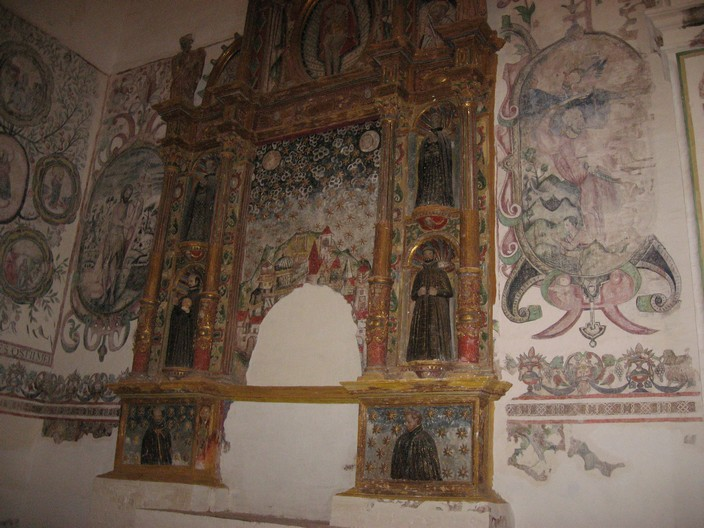
Mural paintings, Juli

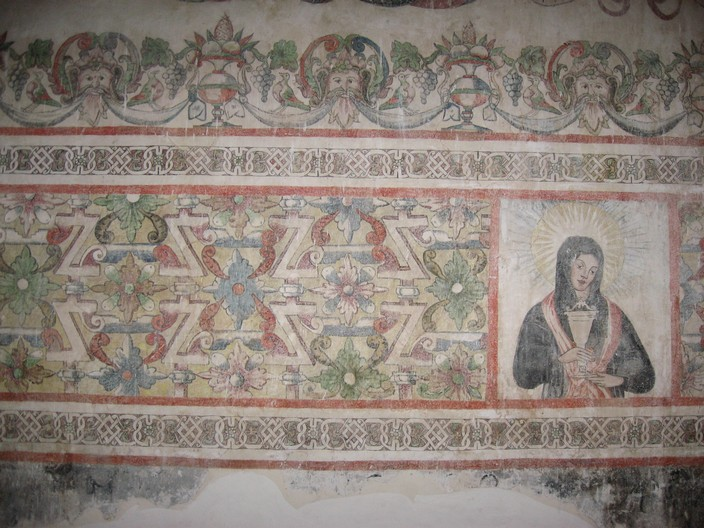
Mural paintings, Juli

== See also ==
- Administrative divisions of Peru
- List of Jesuit sites
