= Zepita District =

Coordinates: 16.4988°S 69.1101°W

Zepita Sipita
- District
- Interactive map of Zepita
- Country: Peru
- Region: Puno
- Province: Chucuito
- Capital: Zepita

Government
  - Mayor: Ricardo Felipe Jiménez Castilla (2011-2014)

Area
  - Total: 546.57 km^{2} (211.03 sq mi)
- Elevation: 3,831 m (12,569 ft)

Population (2007 census)
  - Total: 19,796
  - Density: 36.219/km^{2} (93.806/sq mi)
- Time zone: UTC-5 (PET)
- UBIGEO: 210407

Zepita (from Aymara Sipita) is one of seven districts of the Chucuito Province in Puno Region, Peru.

== Geography ==
One of the highest peaks of the district is Qhapiya at 4,809 m (15,778 ft). Other mountains are listed below:

- Chutani
- Ch'usiqani
- Iñaqani
- Jach'a Qullu
- Jach'a Sirka
- Janq'u Jaqhi
- Jilarata
- Kuntur Jipiña
- Milluni
- Pichaqani
- Pukara
- Turini
- Waka Qala

== Ethnic groups ==
The people in the district are mainly indigenous citizens of Aymara descent. Aymara is the language which the majority of the population (87.08%) learnt to speak in childhood, 12.21% of the residents started speaking using the Spanish language (2007 Peru Census).

== Authorities ==
=== Mayors ===
- 2011-2014: Ricardo Felipe Jiménez Castilla.
- 2007-2010: Mateo Jilaja Mollo.

== See also ==
- Tanqa Tanqa
- Administrative divisions of Peru
