= Chuqi Patilla =

Mountain in Peru

- Location within Peru

Highest point
- Elevation: 5,200 m (17,100 ft)
- Coordinates: 16°51′37″S 69°32′16″W

Geography
- Location: Peru, Puno Region, Chucuito Province
- Parent range: Andes

Chuqi Patilla (Aymara chuqi gold, patilla step, "gold step", Hispanicized spelling Choquepatilla) is a mountain in the Andes of southern Peru, about 5,200 metres (17,060 ft) high. It is situated in the Puno Region, Chucuito Province, in the west of the Pisacoma District. Chuqi Patilla lies east of Qarwa P'iq'iña.
