= Desaguadero =

Desaguadero may refer to:

== Rivers ==
- Desaguadero River (Argentina), a river in Argentina, also known as Río Salado
- Desaguadero River (Bolivia and Peru), a river originated in Lake Titicaca in the border of Peru and Bolivia

== Places ==
- Desaguadero, Argentina
- Desaguadero, Bolivia-Peru, the capital town of Desaguadero District, Chucuito Province, Puno Department, Peru
- Desaguadero District, in Chucuito Province, Puno Department, Peru
- Desaguadero (La Paz), a village in Desaguadero Municipality, Ingavi Province, La Paz Department, Bolivia
- Desaguadero Municipality, in Ingavi Province, La Paz Department, Bolivia
