= Kelluyo District =

Coordinates: 16.7138°S 69.2810°W

Kelluyo Q'illuyu
- District
- Interactive map of Kelluyo
- Country: Peru
- Region: Puno
- Province: Chucuito
- Founded: June 1, 1982
- Capital: Kelluyo

Government
  - Mayor: Demetrio Salamanca Choque

Area
  - Total: 485.77 km^{2} (187.56 sq mi)
- Elevation: 3,830 m (12,570 ft)

Population (2005 census)
  - Total: 13,801
  - Density: 28.411/km^{2} (73.583/sq mi)
- Time zone: UTC-5 (PET)
- UBIGEO: 210404

Kelluyo (Aymara: Q'illuyu, q'illu yellow, uyu corral, "yellow corral") is one of seven districts of the Chucuito Province in Peru.

== Geography ==
One of the highest elevations of the district is Wila Nasa at approximately 4,200 m (13,800 ft). Other mountains are listed below:

- Ch'usiqani
- Janq'u Jaqhi
- Jilarata
- Layuri
- Nasa Parqu
- Para Q'awa
- Pukara
- Sankayuni
- Wila Nasa

== Ethnic groups ==
The people in the district are mainly indigenous citizens of Aymara descent. Aymara is the language which the majority of the population (84.47%) learned to speak in childhood, 14.50% of the residents started speaking using the Spanish language (2007 Peru Census).

== See also ==
- Parinaquta
- Quraquta
