= Atapalluni =

Mountain in Peru

- Location within Peru

Highest point
- Elevation: 4,800 m (15,700 ft)
- Coordinates: 16°46′18″S 69°31′11″W

Geography
- Location: Peru, Puno Region, Chucuito Province, El Collao Province
- Parent range: Andes

Atapalluni (Aymara itapallu, atapallu nettle, -ni a suffix to indicate ownership, "the one with the nettle (or nettles)", also spelled Atapallune) is a mountain in the Andes of southern Peru, about 4,800 metres (15,748 ft) high. It is situated in the Puno Region, El Collao Province, Santa Rosa District, and in the Chucuito Province, Pisacoma District.
