= Chucuito province =

Coordinates: 16.214396°S 69.457381°W

Chucuito Chukuwitu
- Province
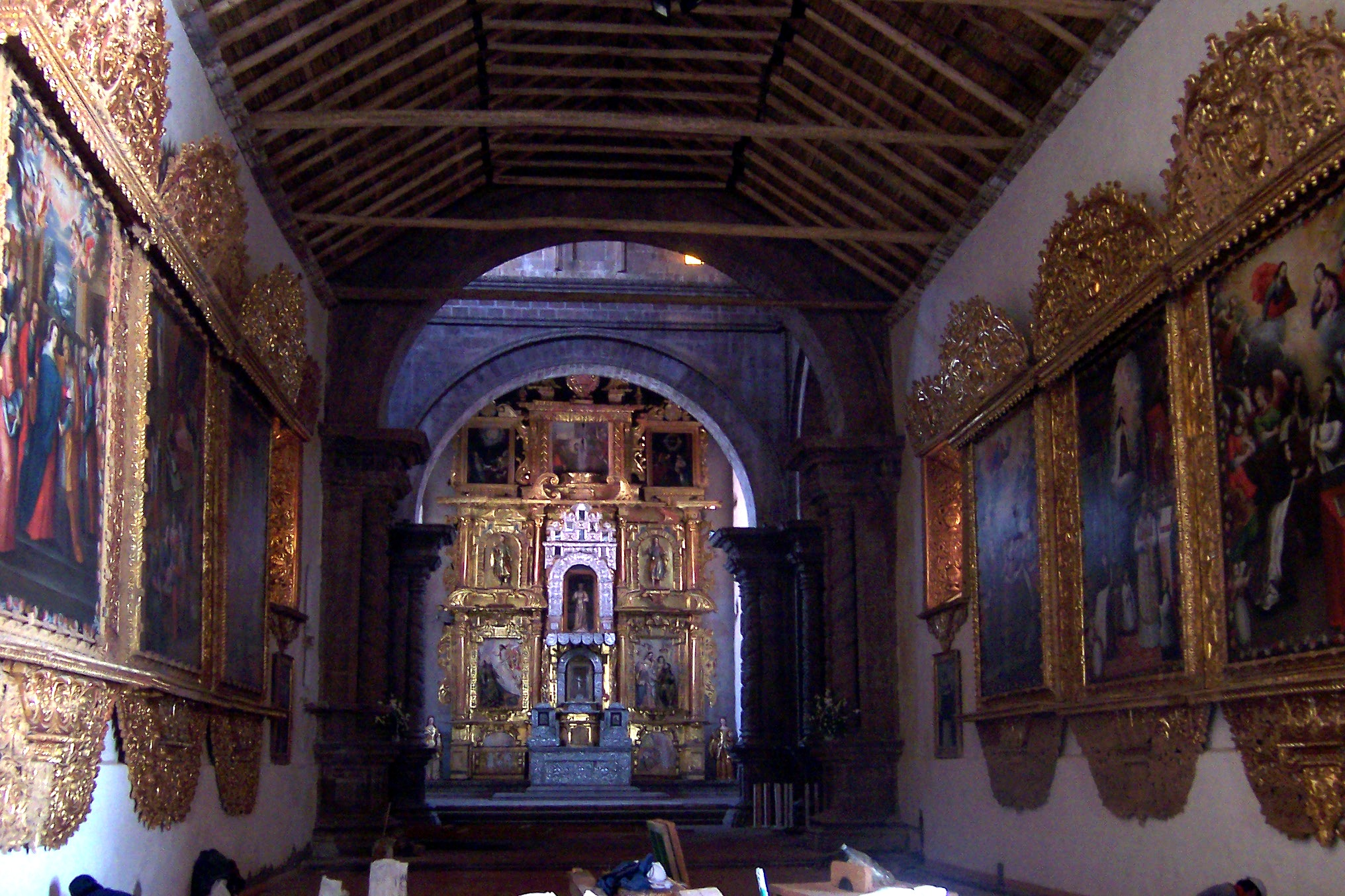
- San Juan de Letrán church in Juli

- Location of Chucuito in the Puno Region
- Country: Peru
- Region: Puno
- Capital: Juli

Government
  - Mayor: Justo Apaza Delgado (2019-2022)

Area
  - Total: 3,978.13 km^{2} (1,535.96 sq mi)

Population
  - Total: 110,083
  - Density: 27.6720/km^{2} (71.6703/sq mi)
- UBIGEO: 2104

Chucuito is a province of the Puno Region in Peru. The capital of the province is the city of Juli.

== History ==
Chucuito is cited by Comentarios Reales de los Incas. On the 1st chapter of the 3rd book of Comentarios reales de los incas, Chucuito is mentioned because of huge monuments and anthropomorphic statues. The Aramu Muru monument is located in the province.

== Geography ==
One of the highest elevations of the province is Chuqi Patilla at approximately 5,200 m (17,100 ft). Other mountains are listed below:

- Altarani
- Arichuwa
- Atapalluni
- Chachakumani
- Chuqi Patilla
- Ch'iyar Jaqhi
- Ch'usiqani
- Ch'uwaña
- Jach'a Nasa
- Jach'a Uma Chuqu
- Janq'u Jaqhi
- Janq'u Qalani
- Jilarata
- Jisk'a Wallata
- Kimsa Chuta
- Kuntur Ikiña
- K'uchuni
- Laram Jaqhi
- Laramani
- Llallawa
- Mamaniri
- Marqu Nasani
- Misani
- Nasa Parqu
- Payrumani
- Pä Sirka
- Pichaqani
- Pukara
- Qarwa P'iq'iña
- Qhapiya
- Q'iruni
- Sankayuni
- Saywani Sirka
- Tanka
- Tanka Qullu
- Uma Chuqu
- Waka P'iqi
- Wallata Awki
- Wanq'uni
- Qarwa P'iq'iña
- Wila Kunka
- Wila Purakani
- Wila Qullu
- Wiluyu

== Languages ==
According to the 2007 census, Aymara was spoken by 72.4% of the population as their first language, while 26.8% spoke Spanish, 0.6% spoke Quechua, 0.1% spoke Asháninka, 0.0% spoke other indigenous languages and 0.0% spoke foreign languages.

== Political division ==
The province measures 3,978.13 square kilometres (1,535.96 sq mi) and is divided into seven districts:

District	Mayor	Capital	Ubigeo
Juli	Justo Apaza Delgado	Juli	210401
Desaguadero		Desaguadero	210402
Huacullani	Jaime Musaja Chipana	Huacullani	210403
Kelluyo	Demetrio Salamanca Choque	Kelluyo	210404
Pisacoma	Nestor Jaime Chino Coaquira	Pisacoma	210405
Pomata	Mario Calani Morales	Pomata	210406
Zepita	Mateo Jilaja Mollo	Zepita	210407

== See also ==
- Parinaquta
- Quraquta
- Q'axilu
- Tanqa Tanqa
