= Quraquta =

Lake in Peru

- Location within Peru
- Location: Peru; Puno Region
- Coordinates: 16°43′33″S 69°12′56″W
- Surface elevation: 3,868 m (12,690 ft)

Quraquta (Aymara qura herb, quta lake, "herb lake", Hispanicized spelling Coracota) is a lake in Peru located in the Puno Region, Chucuito Province, Kelluyo District. It is situated at a height of about 3,868 metres (12,690 ft). Quraquta lies southwest of the lake Parinaquta, near the Bolivian border.
