= Capaso District =

Coordinates: 17.1837°S 69.7445°W

Capazo
- District
- Interactive map of Capazo
- Country: Peru
- Region: Puno
- Province: El Collao
- Founded: September 29, 1988
- Capital: Capazo

Government
  - Mayor: Gualberto Uruche Gutiérrez

Area
  - Total: 1,039.25 km^{2} (401.26 sq mi)
- Elevation: 4,400 m (14,400 ft)

Population (2005 census)
  - Total: 1,830
  - Density: 1.76/km^{2} (4.56/sq mi)
- Time zone: UTC-5 (PET)
- UBIGEO: 210502

Capazo District is one of five districts of the province El Collao in Puno Region, Peru.

== Geography ==
Some of the highest mountains of the district are listed below:

- Jiwaña
- Llallawa
- Sura Wiqu
- Tuma Tumani
- Uma Jalsu
- Wanq'uri
- Wila Chunkara

== Climate ==
Climate data for Capazo, elevation 4,423 m (14,511 ft), (1991–2020)
Month	Jan	Feb	Mar	Apr	May	Jun	Jul	Aug	Sep	Oct	Nov	Dec	Year
Mean daily maximum °C (°F)	13.7 (56.7)	13.5 (56.3)	13.5 (56.3)	13.6 (56.5)	12.8 (55.0)	12.3 (54.1)	11.6 (52.9)	13.0 (55.4)	13.8 (56.8)	15.3 (59.5)	16.2 (61.2)	15.4 (59.7)	13.7 (56.7)
Mean daily minimum °C (°F)	−1.2 (29.8)	−0.8 (30.6)	−1.7 (28.9)	−4.7 (23.5)	−7.6 (18.3)	−10.6 (12.9)	−11.5 (11.3)	−10.7 (12.7)	−8.5 (16.7)	−7.0 (19.4)	−5.1 (22.8)	−3.2 (26.2)	−6.0 (21.1)
Average precipitation mm (inches)	142.9 (5.63)	123.7 (4.87)	76.8 (3.02)	24.4 (0.96)	2.8 (0.11)	2.7 (0.11)	2.9 (0.11)	4.1 (0.16)	3.4 (0.13)	10.5 (0.41)	21.4 (0.84)	73.2 (2.88)	488.8 (19.23)
Source: National Meteorology and Hydrology Service of Peru

== Authorities ==
=== Mayors ===
- 2011-2014: Gualberto Uruche Gutiérrez.
- 2007-2010: Modesto Mayta Ccollo.

== See also ==
- Administrative divisions of Peru
