= Tuma Tumani =

Mountain in Peru

- Location within Peru

Highest point
- Elevation: 5,006.9 m (16,427 ft)
- Coordinates: 17°11′12″S 69°47′32″W

Geography
- Location: Peru, Puno Region, El Collao Province
- Parent range: Andes

Tuma Tumani (Aymara tuma detour, a long way round, the reduplication signifies that there is a group or a complex of something, -ni a suffix to indicate ownership, "the one with many detours", Hispanicized and broken name Tomaromani) is a mountain in the Andes of southern Peru, about 5,006.9 metres (16,427 ft) high. It is situated in the Puno Region, El Collao Province, Capazo District. Tuma Tumani lies east of the mountain Jiwaña at the plain named Jiwaña Pampa. The Jiwaña River flows along its slopes before it reaches the Mawri River (Mauri).

== See also ==
- Sura Wiqu
- Wanq'uri
