= Tanqa Tanqa =

Archaeological site in Peru

Coordinates: 16°35′12″S 69°15′12″W

- Interactive map of Tanqa Tanqa
- Location: Peru, Puno Region
- Region: Andes

Tanqa Tanqa (Aymara for beetle, Hispanicized spelling Tanca Tanca, also Tanka Tanka) or Tanka Tanka (Aymara tanka hat or biretta, the reduplication indicates that there is a group of something, "many hats (or birettas)") is an archaeological site in Peru. It is located in the Puno Region, Chucuito Province, Zepita District. The site was declared a National Cultural Heritage (Patrimonio Cultural) of Peru.
