= Wanq'uri =

Mountain in Peru

- Location within Peru

Highest point
- Elevation: 5,074.9 m (16,650 ft)
- Coordinates: 17°7′44″S 69°40′53″W

Geography
- Location: Peru, Puno Region, El Collao Province
- Parent range: Andes

Wanq'uri (Aymara wanq'u guinea pig, -ri a suffix, Hispanicized spelling Huancure) is a mountain in the Andes of southern Peru, about 5,074.9 metres (16,650 ft) high. It lies in the Puno Region, El Collao Province, Capazo District. Wanq'uri is situated southeast of the mountain Sura Wiqu and northeast of the mountains Tuma Tumani and Ch'ila (Chila).
