= Arichuwa (El Collao-Chucuito) =

Mountain in Peru

- Location within Peru

Highest point
- Elevation: 5,000 m (16,000 ft)
- Coordinates: 16°49′59″S 69°33′56″W

Geography
- Location: Peru, Puno Region, Chucuito Province, El Collao Province
- Parent range: Andes

Arichuwa (Aymara or Quechua for a kind of potatoes, Hispanicized spelling Arichua) is a mountain in the Andes of southern Peru, about 5,000 metres (16,404 ft) high. It is situated in the Puno Region, El Collao Province, Santa Rosa District, and in the Chucuito Province, Pisacoma District. Arichuwa lies north of the peaks of Qarwa P'iq'iña.

Arichuwa is also the name of an intermittent stream which originates north of the mountain. It flows to the northwest.
