= Parinaquta (Chucuito) =

Lake in Puno, Peru

- Location within Peru
- Location: Peru; Puno Region
- Coordinates: 16°43′00″S 69°11′00″W
- Surface elevation: 3,772 m (12,375 ft)

Parinaquta (Aymara parina flamingo, quta lake, "flamingo lake", Hispanicized spelling Parinacota) is a lake in Peru located in the Puno Region, Chucuito Province, Kelluyo District. It is situated at a height of about 3,772 metres (12,375 ft). Parinaquta lies northeast of the lake Quraquta, near the Bolivian border.
