= Pisacoma District =

Coordinates: 16.9080°S 69.3656°W

Pisacoma P'isaq Uma
- District
- Interactive map of Pisacoma
- Country: Peru
- Region: Puno
- Province: Chucuito
- Capital: Pisacoma

Government
  - Mayor: Nestor Jaime Chino Coaquira

Area
  - Total: 959.34 km^{2} (370.40 sq mi)
- Elevation: 3,915 m (12,844 ft)

Population (2005 census)
  - Total: 11,086
  - Density: 11.556/km^{2} (29.930/sq mi)
- Time zone: UTC-5 (PET)
- UBIGEO: 210405

Pisacoma (from Aymara P'isaq Uma) is one of seven districts of the Chucuito Province in Peru.

== Geography ==
One of the highest elevations of the district is Chuqi Patilla at approximately 5,200 m (17,100 ft). Other mountains are listed below:

- Arichuwa
- Atapalluni
- Chuqi Ch'iwani
- Jach'a Nasa
- Janq'u Qalani
- Jilarata
- Jisk'a Wallata
- Kiwuri
- K'ara K'arani
- K'uchuni
- Misani
- Payrumani
- Pichaqani
- Qutaña
- Q'iruni
- Tanka
- Timillu Nasa
- Wallata Awki
- Llallawa
- Qarwa P'iq'iña
- Qawra Qullu
- Wila Kunka

== Ethnic groups ==
The people in the district are mainly indigenous citizens of Aymara descent. Aymara is the language which the majority of the population (51.30%) learnt to speak in childhood, 48.08% of the residents started speaking using the Spanish language (2007 Peru Census).

== Climate ==
Climate data for Pisacoma, elevation 3,930 m (12,890 ft), (1991–2020)
Month	Jan	Feb	Mar	Apr	May	Jun	Jul	Aug	Sep	Oct	Nov	Dec	Year
Mean daily maximum °C (°F)	16.8 (62.2)	16.5 (61.7)	16.8 (62.2)	17.3 (63.1)	16.8 (62.2)	16.0 (60.8)	15.8 (60.4)	16.7 (62.1)	17.8 (64.0)	18.6 (65.5)	19.4 (66.9)	18.5 (65.3)	17.3 (63.0)
Mean daily minimum °C (°F)	3.6 (38.5)	3.5 (38.3)	2.5 (36.5)	−0.2 (31.6)	−4.3 (24.3)	−6.0 (21.2)	−6.1 (21.0)	−4.6 (23.7)	−2.8 (27.0)	−0.8 (30.6)	0.6 (33.1)	2.4 (36.3)	−1.0 (30.2)
Average precipitation mm (inches)	148.6 (5.85)	137.2 (5.40)	79.7 (3.14)	21.7 (0.85)	3.9 (0.15)	5.4 (0.21)	4.4 (0.17)	9.1 (0.36)	10.8 (0.43)	19.5 (0.77)	25.8 (1.02)	91.1 (3.59)	557.2 (21.94)
Source: National Meteorology and Hydrology Service of Peru
