= Aramu Muru =

Peruvian abandoned stone carving

- Ajayu marka (Perú)
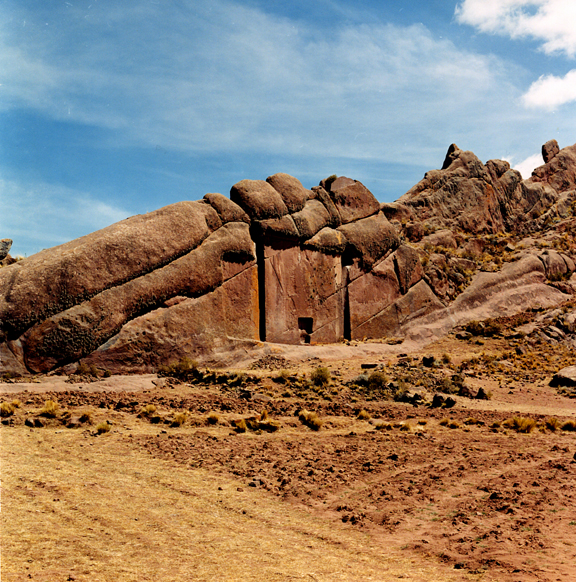
- Location: Peru, Chucuito Province
- Coordinates: 16°10′14.5″S 69°32′27.92″W
- Type: Rock-cut architecture
- Material: Stone

Aramu Muru is an abandoned stone carving in Peru, near Lake Titicaca, known as “Gate of the Gods”. It was discovered in the early 1990s and is believed to be an abandoned Incan construction project. The flat stone is approximately 23 ft (7.0 m) square, with a T-shaped niche measuring 6 feet and 6 inches (198 cm) tall carved into it.

Aramu Muru is a popular tourist destination for paranormal pilgrimage. Legend has it that an Incan priest in possession of a golden disk, placed the disk in a small depression in the 'door' (the 'door' being the niche carved into the rock), and this caused the door to open. The golden disk supposedly dropped from the sky.
