= Llallawa =

Mountain in Peru

- Location within Peru

Highest point
- Elevation: 5,000 m (16,000 ft)
- Coordinates: 17°3′54″S 69°32′42″W

Geography
- Location: Peru, Puno Region, Chucuito Province, El Collao Province
- Parent range: Andes

Llallawa (Aymara for a monstrous potato (like two potatoes) or animal, Quechua for the god of seed-time during the Inca period, Hispanicized spelling Llallahua) is a mountain in the Andes of southern Peru, about 5,000 metres (16,404 ft) high. It is situated in the Puno Region, El Collao Province, Capazo District, and in the Chucuito Province, Pisacoma District.
