= Pomata District =

Coordinates: 16.2667°S 69.3088°W

Pomata Pumata
- District
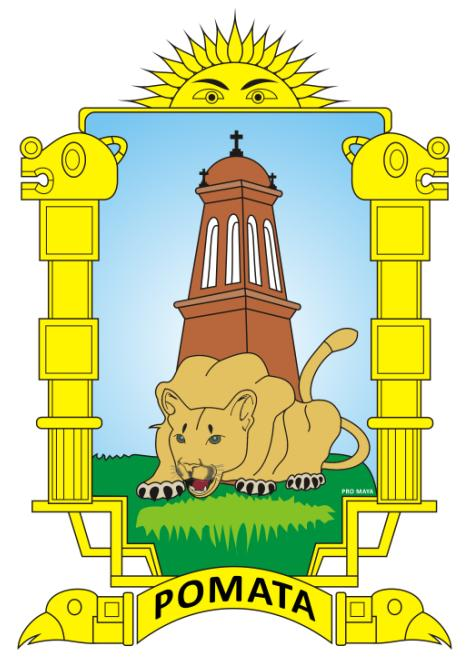
- Coat of arms
- Interactive map of Pomata
- Country: Peru
- Region: Puno
- Province: Chucuito
- Capital: Pomata

Government
  - Mayor: Fredy Gualberto Castillo Venegas

Area
  - Total: 382.58 km^{2} (147.71 sq mi)
- Elevation: 3,876 m (12,717 ft)

Population (2007 census)
  - Total: 17,787
  - Density: 46.492/km^{2} (120.41/sq mi)
- Time zone: UTC-5 (PET)
- UBIGEO: 210406

Pomata District is one of seven districts of the Chucuito Province in Puno Region, Peru.

== Geography ==
One of the highest peaks of the district is Qhapiya at 4,809 m (15,778 ft). Other mountains are listed below:

- Jichu Qullu
- K'isini
- Laramani
- Pallalla Qullu
- Pusi Khuchini
- Phinawi
- Sura Wiqu
- Turun Sirka
- Ulla
- Urqur Uma
- Urquri
- Wari Kunka

== Ethnic groups ==
The people in the district are mainly indigenous citizens of Aymara descent. Aymara is the language which the majority of the population (80.79%) learnt to speak in childhood, 18.64% of the residents started speaking using the Spanish language (2007 Peru Census).

== Authorities ==
=== Mayors ===
- 2015-today: Fredy Gualberto Castillo Venegaa
- 2011-2014: Walter Agustín Quispe Galindo.
- 2007-2010: Mario Calani Morales

== See also ==
- Administrative divisions of Peru
