= Historic Centre of Arequipa =

Historical Centre of the City of Arequipa
UNESCO World Heritage Site
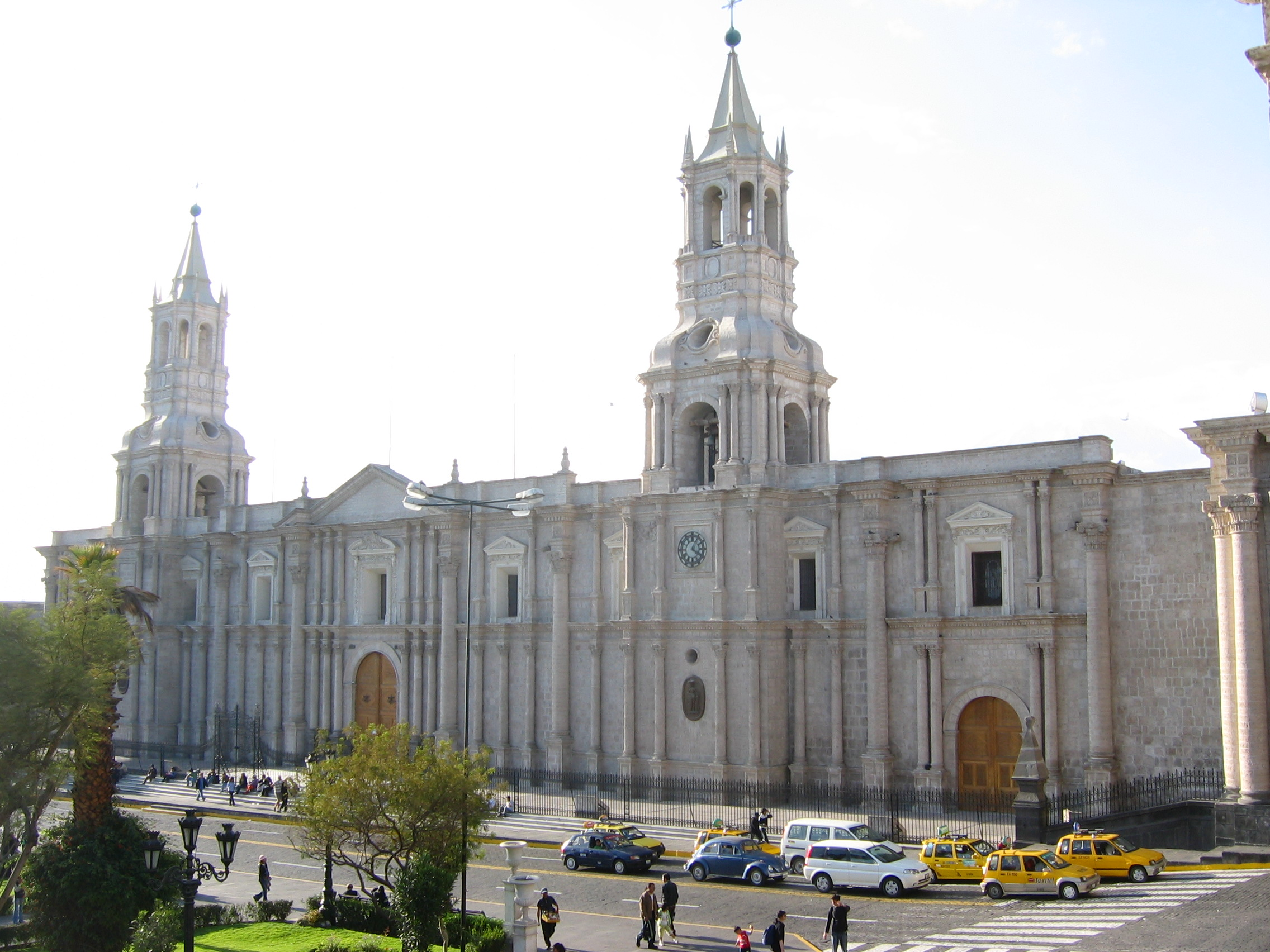
- Cathedral of Arequipa

- Location within Peru
- Location: Arequipa, Arequipa Province, Arequipa Region, Peru
- Criteria: Cultural: (i), (iv)
- Reference: 1016
- Inscription: 2000 (24th Session)
- Area: 166.52 ha (411.5 acres)
- Buffer zone: 165.47 ha (408.9 acres)
- Coordinates: 16°24′S 71°32′W

In December 2000, UNESCO declared the historical center of Arequipa a World Heritage Site, stating the following:

"The historical center of Arequipa is an example of ornamented architecture, represents a masterpiece of the creative coalition of European and native characteristics. A colonial town challenged by the conditions of nature, the indigenous influences, the conquest process and evangelism as well as for a spectacular natural scenario."

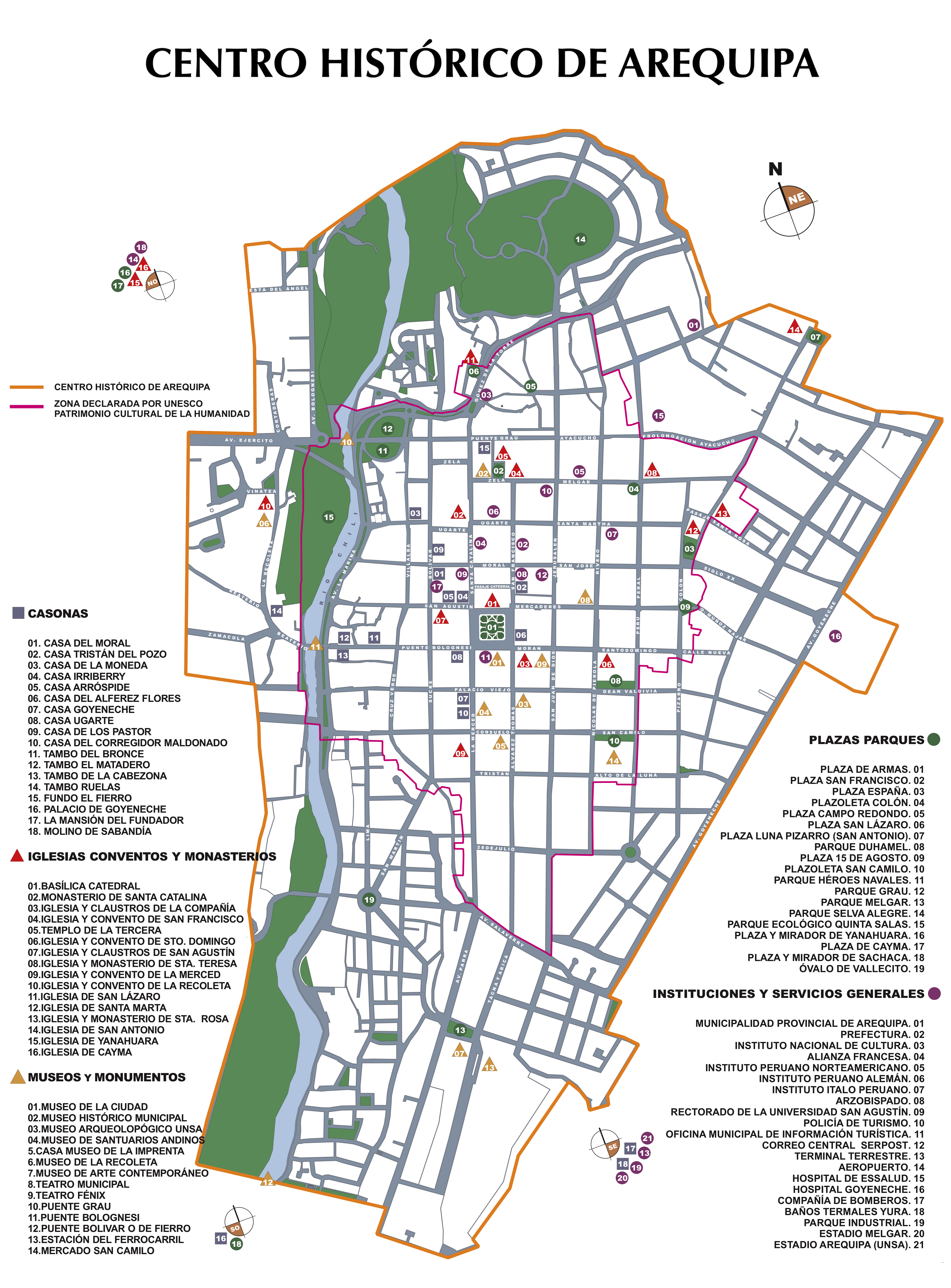
Map of the historical centre

== Description ==
The historic centre of Arequipa, built in volcanic sillar rock, represents an integration of European and native building techniques and characteristics, expressed in the admirable work of colonial masters and Criollo and Indian masons. This combination of influences is illustrated by the city's robust walls, archways and vaults, courtyards and open spaces, and the intricate Baroque decoration of its facades.

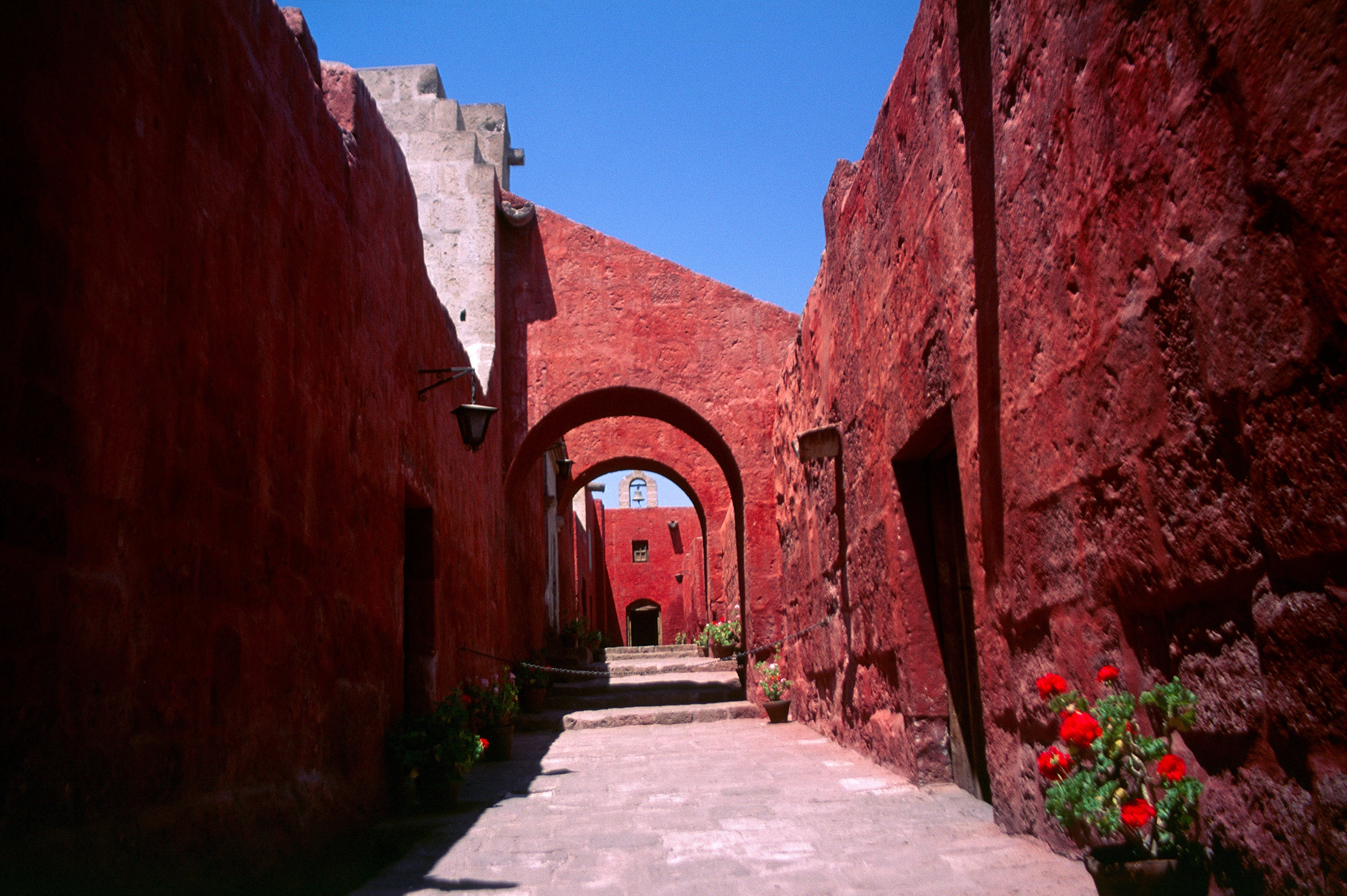
Monastery of Santa Catalina
