= Qarwa P'iq'iña =

Mountain in Peru

- Location within Peru

Highest point
- Elevation: 5,100 m (16,700 ft)
- Coordinates: 16°51′28″S 69°33′25″W

Geography
- Location: Peru, Puno Region, Chucuito Province, El Collao Province
- Parent range: Andes

Qarwa P'iq'iña (Aymara qawra, qarwa llama, p'iq'iña head, "llama head", Hispanicized spelling Carhuapequeña) is a mountain in the Andes of southern Peru, about 5,100 metres (16,732 ft) high. It is situated in the Puno Region, El Collao Province, Santa Rosa District, and in the Chucuito Province, Pisacoma District. The peaks of Qarwa P'iq'iña lie south of Arichuwa.
