= Jiwaña =

Mountain in Peru

- Location within Peru

Highest point
- Elevation: 5,000 m (16,000 ft)
- Coordinates: 17°10′38″S 69°53′00″W

Geography
- Location: Peru, Puno Region, El Collao Province
- Parent range: Andes

Jiwaña (Aymara for to die / massacre, slaughter, slaughtering, Hispanicized names Coverane, Coverane Gihuana, Gihuana, Koverane) is a mountain in the Andes of southern Peru, about 5,000 metres (16,404 ft) high. It is located in the Puno Region, El Collao Province, Capazo District. Jiwaña lies west of Tuma Tumani and southeast of Wila Chunkara. It is south of the plain named Jiwaña Pampa (Jihuaña Pampa). The Jiwaña River (Jihuaña) originates near the mountain. It flows through the plain before it reaches the Mawri River (Mauri).
