= Desaguadero District =

Coordinates: 16.5648°S 69.0472°W

Desaguadero Huchusuma
- District
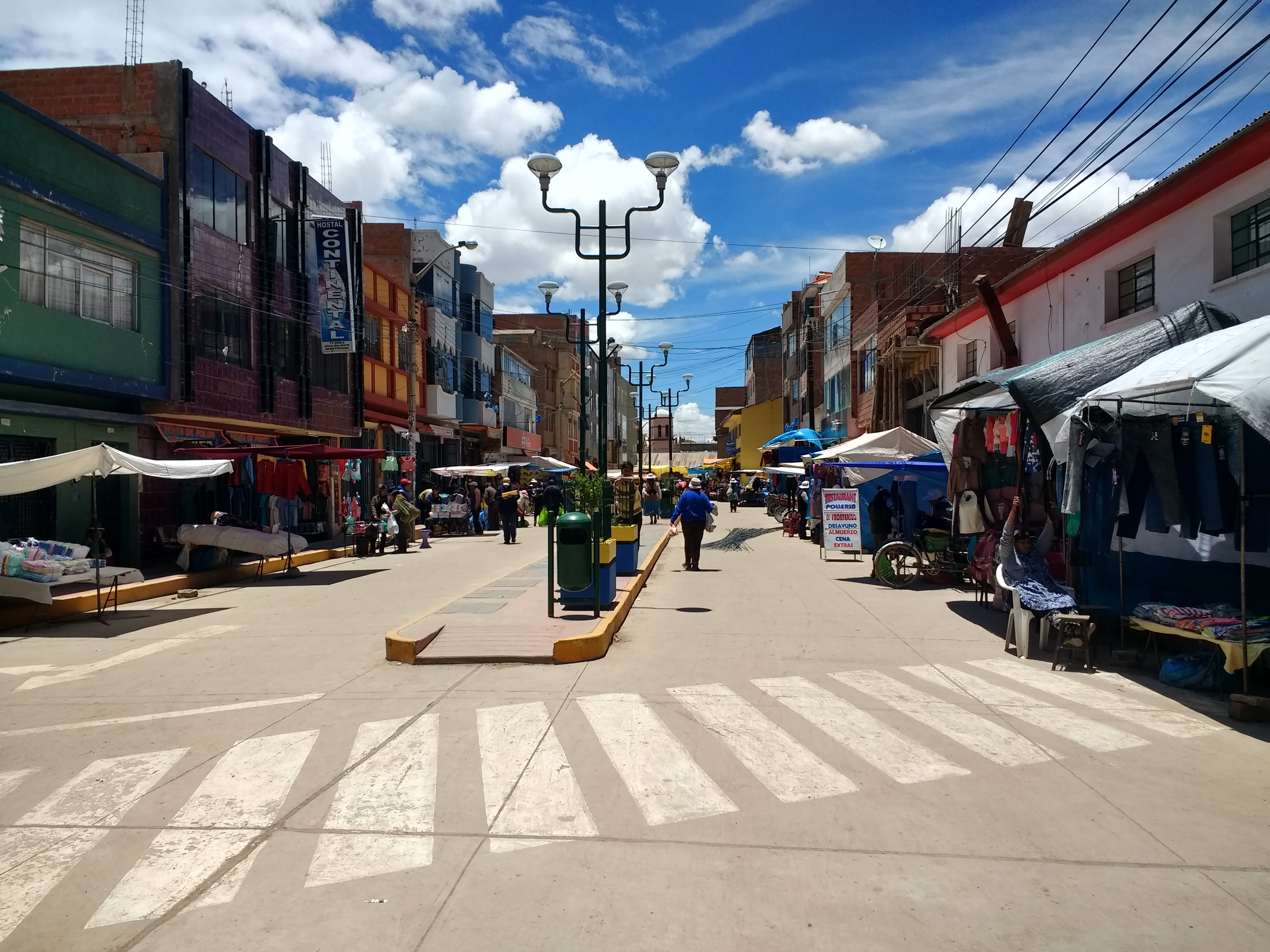
- Desaguadero district
- Interactive map of Desaguadero
- Country: Peru
- Region: Puno
- Province: Chucuito
- Capital: Desaguadero

Government
  - Mayor: Juan Carlos Aquino Condori

Area
  - Total: 178.21 km^{2} (68.81 sq mi)
- Elevation: 3,832 m (12,572 ft)

Population (2007 census)
  - Total: 20,009
  - Density: 112.28/km^{2} (290.80/sq mi)
- Time zone: UTC-5 (PET)
- UBIGEO: 210402

Desaguadero District is one of seven districts of the province Chucuito in Puno Region, Peru.

== Climate ==
Climate data for Desaguadero, elevation 3,833 m (12,575 ft), (1991–2020)
Month	Jan	Feb	Mar	Apr	May	Jun	Jul	Aug	Sep	Oct	Nov	Dec	Year
Mean daily maximum °C (°F)	15.3 (59.5)	15.3 (59.5)	15.3 (59.5)	15.2 (59.4)	14.6 (58.3)	13.4 (56.1)	13.1 (55.6)	13.9 (57.0)	14.9 (58.8)	16.1 (61.0)	16.8 (62.2)	16.4 (61.5)	15.0 (59.0)
Mean daily minimum °C (°F)	5.3 (41.5)	5.6 (42.1)	5.4 (41.7)	3.3 (37.9)	−0.8 (30.6)	−3.0 (26.6)	−3.1 (26.4)	−2.2 (28.0)	0.6 (33.1)	2.5 (36.5)	3.5 (38.3)	5.0 (41.0)	1.8 (35.3)
Average precipitation mm (inches)	180.9 (7.12)	158.3 (6.23)	108.5 (4.27)	36.3 (1.43)	5.1 (0.20)	7.1 (0.28)	6.8 (0.27)	13.0 (0.51)	18.6 (0.73)	33.5 (1.32)	43.1 (1.70)	88.0 (3.46)	699.2 (27.52)
Source: National Meteorology and Hydrology Service of Peru

== Authorities ==
=== Mayors ===
- 2011–2014: Juan Carlos Aquino Condori.
- 2007–2010: Wilson Néstor Quispe Mendoza.

== See also ==
- Administrative divisions of Peru
