= Wila Chunkara =

Mountain in Peru

- Location within Peru

Highest point
- Elevation: 4,800 m (15,700 ft)
- Coordinates: 17°09′22″S 69°54′27″W

Geography
- Location: Peru, Puno Region, El Collao Province
- Parent range: Andes

Wila Chunkara (Aymara wila blood, blood-red, chunkara pointed mountain, "red pointed mountain", Hispanicized spelling Vilachuncara) is a mountain in the Andes of southern Peru, about 4,800 metres (15,748 ft) high. It is situated in the Puno Region, El Collao Province, on the border of the districts Capazo and Santa Rosa. Wila Chunkara lies northwest of the mountain Jiwaña and the plain named Jiwaña Pampa (Jihuaña Pampa). The Jiwaña River (Jihuaña) originates near the mountain. It flows through the plain before it reaches the Mawri River (Mauri).
