= Sura Wiqu =

Mountain in Peru

- Location within Peru

Highest point
- Elevation: 5,000 m (16,000 ft)
- Coordinates: 17°6′39″S 69°46′50″W

Geography
- Location: Peru, Puno Region, El Collao Province
- Parent range: Andes

Sura Wiqu (Aymara sura dry jiquima, a species of Pachyrhizus, wiqu a corner in a house, a mountain cove, "jiquima cove", Hispanicized spelling Soravico) is a mountain in the Andes of southern Peru, about 5,000 metres (16,404 ft) high. It lies in the Puno Region, El Collao Province, Capazo District. Sura Wiqu is situated north-west of the mountain Wanq'uri and north-east of the mountain Tuma Tumani.

Sura Wiqu (Suraveco) is also the name of a neighboring lower mountain to the north-west, about 4,800 metres (15,748 ft) high, at 17°4′57″S 69°48′46″W.
