= Zepita =

Coordinates: 16°30′S 69°06′W

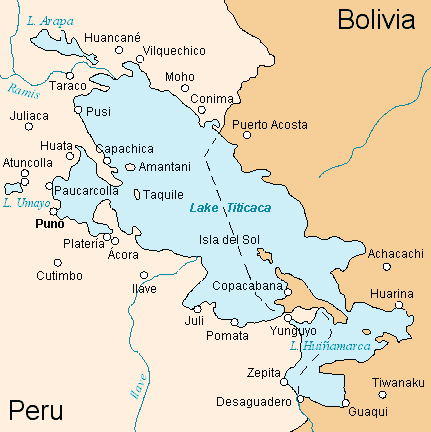
Zepita's location near Lake Titicaca

Zepita is a town in the Chucuito Province south of Lake Titicaca in the Puno Region of Peru. It has a population of 19,884.
