= List of wars involving the Inca Empire =

This is a list of wars involving the Inca Empire (1438–1535), as well as its predecessors the Kingdom of Cusco, Chimor, the Tiwanaku Empire, and the Wari Empire.

== Pre-Cusco period ==
Conflict	Combatant 1	Combatant 2	Results
Wari Empire expansion campaigns (7th-10th century)	Wari Empire: Huarpas	Caxamarca culture Lambayeque culture Lima culture Moche culture Nazca culture Recuay culture	Wari victory: The Wari culture is consolidated as the 1st pan-andean empire, controlling Ancient Peru from modern Lambayeque to Moquegua.; Andean civilizations enters to the Middle Horizon in the Periodization of pre-Columbian Peru.
Wari invasion of Moquegua (10th/11th century)	Wari Empire	Tiwanaku Empire	Wari victory: Moquegua is destroyed.; Decline of both empires.
Wari internal conflicts (12th century)	Wari Empire	Rebel forces Foreign Invaders	The empire is fragmented into Sican Kingdom, Chimu Kingdom, Chancay culture, Tallán lordship, Chincha culture, Chachapoya culture, Huaylas Lordship, Cajamarca Kingdom, Huanca kingdom, Collique lordship.
Aymara invasions to Tiawanaku (12th century)	Tiwanaku Empire	Aymaras	Aymara victory: The Aymaras managed to gain the entire Andean plateau (modern Bolivia) for themselves, meanwhile the Tiahuanacos were forced to emigrate to the north (modern Southern Peru).; Some Tiawanaku royal Ayllus establish on Cuzco and found the Inca lordship.
Tiawanku civil war (12th century)	Tiwanaku Empire	Rebel forces	The empire is fragmented into Aymara regional states, among which the Colla kingdom, the Lupaca kingdom and the Pacajes kingdom stand out.; Andean civilizations enters to the Late Intermediate in the Periodization of pre-Columbian Peru.
Chimu conquest of Sican (1375)	Chimu Empire	Sican Kingdom	Sican is turned into a province of the Chimu kingdom.

== Kingdom of Cusco ==
Conflict	Allies	War against	Results	Head of State
Conquest of the Ayaviri (13th century)	Kingdom of Cusco	Ayaviris	Inca victory	Lloque Yupanqui
Battle of Huaychu (13th century)	Kingdom of Cusco	Colla Kingdom	Inca victory	Mayta Cápac
Rebellion of the Mascas (14th century)	Kingdom of Cusco	Mascas	Inca victory: The leader of the Masca people, Guasi Guaca, is taken prisoner.	Inca Roca
Rebellion of the Muyna and the Pinahua (14th century)	Kingdom of Cusco	Muyna Pinahua	Inca victory: Death of Muyna Pongo, Muyna leader. Flight of Guaman Tupa, Pinahua leader.	Inca Roca

== Inca Empire (1438–1535) ==
Conflict	Allies	War against	Results	Head of State
Chanka–Inca War (1438–1440)	Inca Empire	Chanka Kingdom	Inca victory: Beginning of the Third Inca Expansion.	Viracocha Inca Pachacuti
Inca-Chincha war (1440–1460)	Inca Empire	Chincha Lordship	Inca victory	Pachacuti
Colla–Inca War (1445–1550)	Inca Empire	Aymara kingdoms: Colla Kingdom	Inca victory • Quechuanization of the Collao	Pachacuti
Huarco-Inca War (1450s)	Inca Empire	Huarco Confederation	Inca victory: After 5 years of war, the Huarco leaders are massively hanged in the Canchari Fortress. The Incas kills all the princes of Huarco.	Pachacuti Topa Inca Yupanqui
Rebellion of the Ayarmacas (1460s)	Inca Empire	Ayarmacas	Inca victory: The Ayarmaca curaca is taken prisoner.	Pachacuti Topa Inca Yupanqui
Conquest of the Cajamarcas (1460s)	Inca Empire	Caxamarcas Chimu Empire	Inca victory: The Cajamarca leader Husmancu Cápac, with his Chimú Cápac ally, are taken as prisoners and died on Cuzco.; Casus belli for the Chimor–Inca War.	Pachacuti
Conquest of the Chimú Empire (1470)	Inca Empire	Chimu Empire	Inca victory: Inca sack of Chan Chan. The treasures are used to decoy the Coricancha; The Chimu leader Minchancaman is taken prisoner; End of Chimu hegemony on North Peru. Consolidation of Inca hegemony on Ancient Peru.	Pachacuti Topa Inca Yupanqui
Guaraní invasions (1470–1533)	Inca Empire	Tupi-Guaraní people	Inca pyrrhic victory: Guarani sacks successfully the Inca domains, but are expelled.	Pachacuti Topa Inca Yupanqui Huayna Capac
Conquest of Collasuyu; 1470s to 1490s	Inca Empire	Diaguita; Huarpes; Omaguacas; Atacamas; Comechingones; Guaycuru peoples; Chichas	Inca victory: Incorporation of Collasuyu to the empire; Churumatas, Tomatas and Moyos Moyos dispersed	Topa Inca Yupanqui
Mapuche-Inca War (1471–1530)	Inca Empire	Mapuches: Picunche	Inca pyrrhic victory: The Mapuches of the south of the Maule River maintain their independence.; Border conflicts will continue on the Arauco War	Topa Inca Yupanqui Huayna Capac
Conquest of the Chachapoyas (1472)	Inca Empire	Chachapoya culture	Inca Victory: Incan attempts to make an ethnocide to Chachapoyas by forcing them to be a diaspora or being part of the Inca army.	Topa Inca Yupanqui
Rebellion of the Chimú (1475)	Inca Empire	Chimor	Inca Victory: Execution of the Chimú leader.	Topa Inca Yupanqui
Conquest of the peoples of the northern Andes (1490–1520)	Inca Empire	Northern Andes Peoples: Chachapoyas; Cañaris; Quitus; Cochasquí; Cayambi; Caranquis; Peruchos; Otavalos; Puruhá; Pastos	Inca Victory: The Incas beheaded the Caranquis, near the Yahuarcocha lagoon (blood lagoon), killing 2000-20000 people.	Topa Inca Yupanqui Huayna Capac
Inca civil war (1529–1532)	Huascarist	Atahualpist	Atahualpa Victory	Huáscar
Spanish Conquest of the Inca Empire (1532–1572): Conquest of Bolivia; Conquest of Chile; Conquest of Ecuador; 2nd Inca-Spanish War; Manco Inca Rebellion; Titu Cusi's Vilcabamba campaign; Tupac Amaru I's Vilcabamba campaign	Inca Empire (until 1535) Neo-Inca State (since 1537)	Spanish Empire: New Castile; New Toledo; Indian auxiliaries: Huancas; Chankas; Cañaris; Huaylas; Chachapoyas; Huascarist Incas; Catholicized Inca nobility; Neo-Inca State (1533–1536); Tlaxcaltecas; Nicaraguas	Spanish Victory: Establishment of the Viceroyalty of Peru.; Spanish monarchs gets the right of succession of the Sapa Incas monarchy (Reynos del Perú) through Translatio imperii.	Atahualpa Incas of Vilcabamba
