= Cutimbo =

Archaeological site in Peru

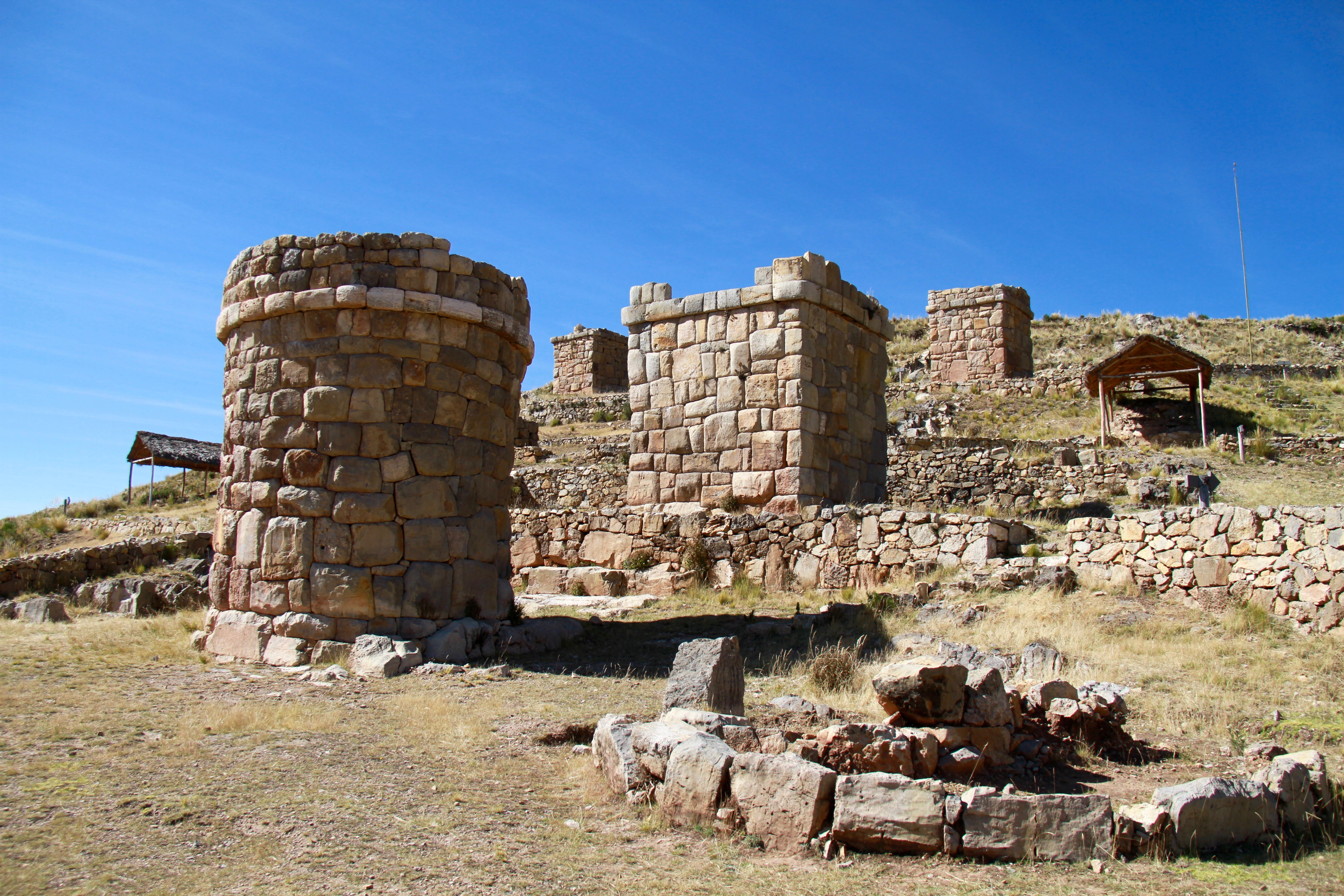
- Partial view of the archaeological site of Cutimbo.

- Location within Peru
- 16°01′15″S 70°00′08″W
- Associated with: Colla, Lupaca, Inca
- Location: Peru, Puno Region
- Region: Andes

History
- Built by: Colla Kingdom

Cutimbo (possibly from Quechua for giant armadillo) is an archaeological site with stone tombs (chullpa) and cave paintings in Peru.

It is located in the Puno Region, Puno Province, Pichacani District. The site was declared a National Cultural Heritage (Patrimonio Cultural) of Peru by the National Institute of Culture.

== See also ==
- Inca Uyo
- Inka Tunuwiri
- Kenko, Puno
- Mallkuamaya
- Molloko
