= Lupaca =

Subgroup of Aymara people

Lupaca kingdom
- c. 1150–c. 1600
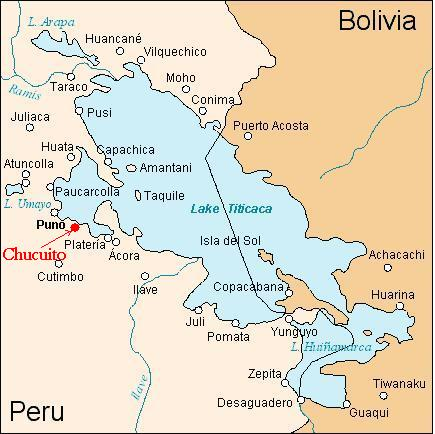
- Location of Chucuito, the capital of the Inca province of the Lupacas, and Cutimbo, the pre-Inca capital.
- Capital: Cutimbo (1150-1463), Chucuito (1463-1600)
- Common languages: Aymara
- Government: Diarchy
- Historical era: Late Intermediate
  - Established: c. 1150
  - Conquered by the Inca Empire under Pachacuti: c. 1463
  - Revolt crushed by Topa Inca Yupanqui: c. 1473
  - Disestablished: c. 1600
Preceded by	Succeeded by
Tiwanaku Empire	Inca Empire

The Lupaca, Lupaka, or Lupaqa people were one of the divisions of the ancestral Aymaras. The Lupaca lived for many centuries near Lake Titicaca in Peru and their lands possibly extended into Bolivia. The Lupacas and other Aymara peoples formed powerful kingdoms after the collapse of the Tiwanaku Empire in the 11th century. In the mid 15th century they were conquered by the Inca Empire and in the 1530s came under the control of the Spanish Empire.

The residence of the pre-Inca kings of Lupaca was probably what is today the archaeological site of Cutimbo. The capital of the Inca province was Chucuito, presently a village of the same name where the archaeological site of Inca Uyu is located.

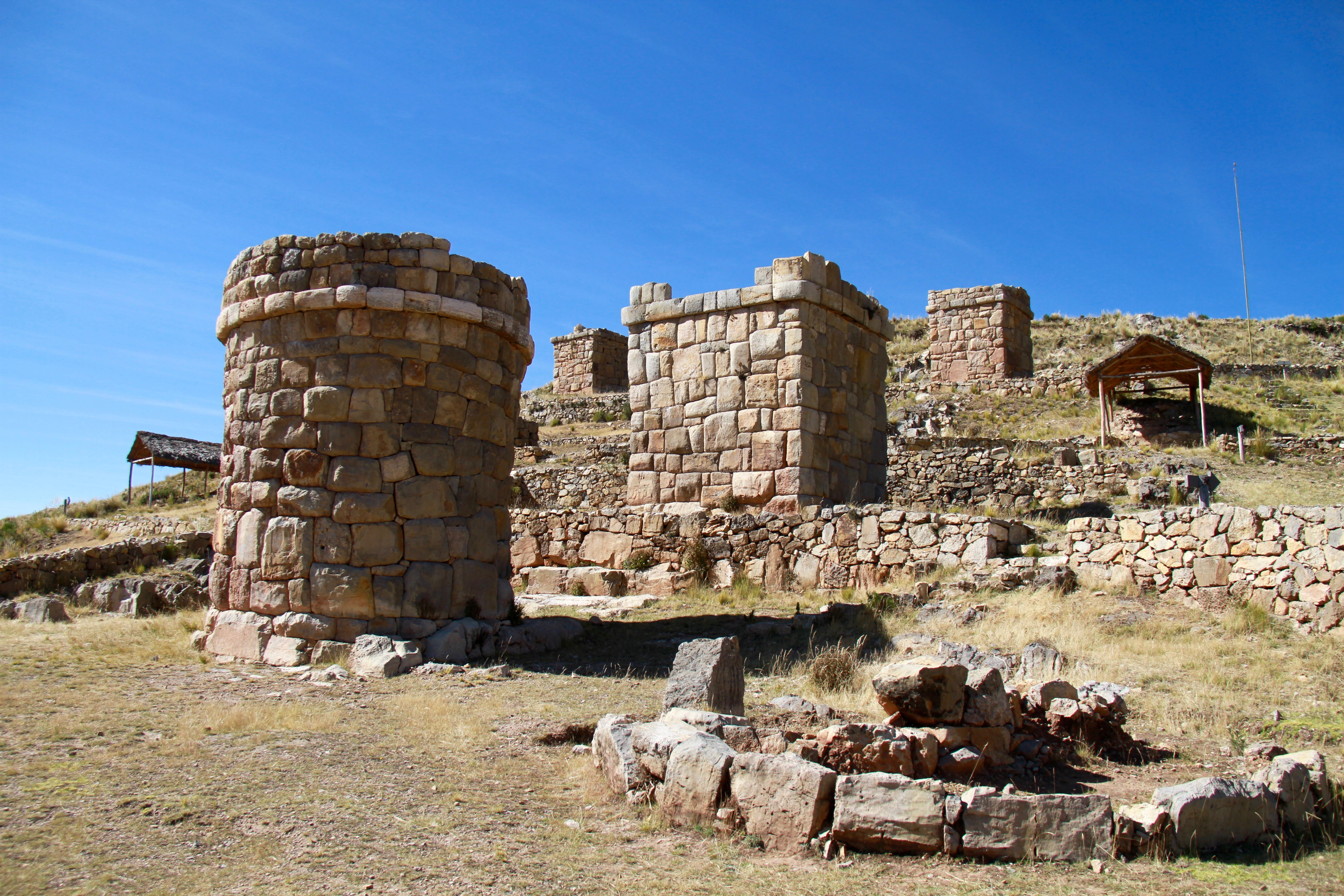
Cutimbo was likely the residence of the Lupaca kings in pre-Inca times.

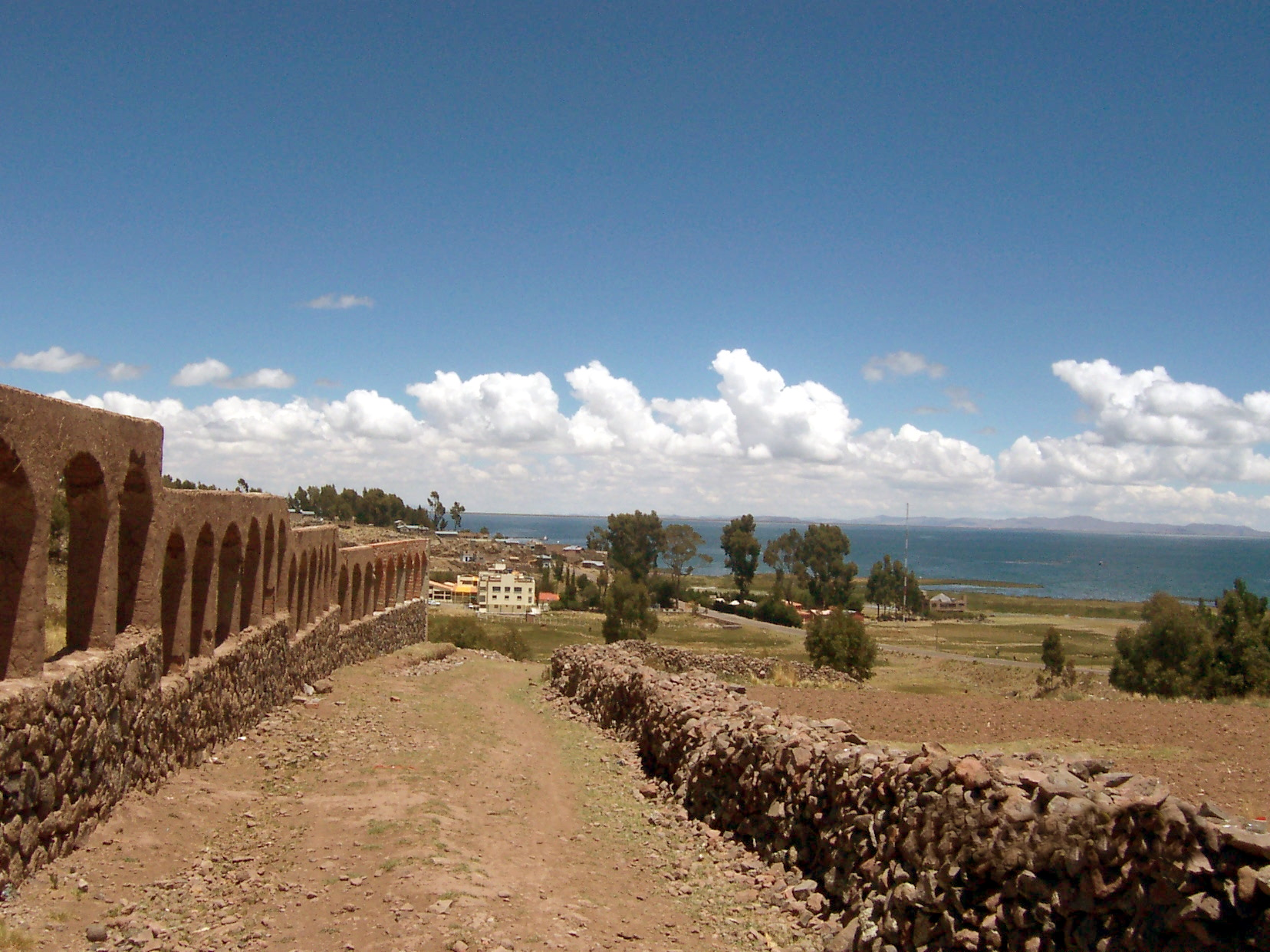
A photo of present-day Chucuito on Lake Titicaca which was the capital of the Inca province inhabited mostly by the Lupaca.

== History ==
The Lupaca occupied seven urban centers, all of them present day cities and villages in the Puno region of Peru: Chucuito, Acora, Ilave, Juli, Pomata, Yunguyo and Zepita. The Lupaca were incorporated into the growing Inca Empire by the emperor Pachacuti (reigned 1438-1471). During the reign of Topa Inca Yupanqui (1471-1493), the Inca crushed a revolt by the Lupaca and their northern neighbors, the Colla.

In the 16th century, the Incas conducted a census of the Chucuito province and recorded it on a Quipu that was interpreted for the Spanish. The total number of households in Chucuito was 20,080 of which 15,778 were Aymara. 4.129 were Uru, and 173 were mitma. This implies a population of about 100,000 people in total.

The Lupaca had little contact with the Spanish until 1538, when the Lupaca and Colla went to war. The Colla appealed for help from the Spanish in Cuzco and Hernando Pizarro led an army southward and defeated the Lupaca at the southern tip of Lake Titicaca where the Desaguadero River flows from the lake. The battle went poorly for the Spanish for a time and Pizarro nearly drowned trying to cross the river, but was rescued by Paullu Inca, the Inca emperor installed by the Spanish.

Despite the defeat, Lupaca continued to be rich and powerful. A Spaniard, Garci Diez de San Miguel, visited and wrote of the Lupaca in 1567. There were at the time 16 Dominican priests and a few Spanish merchants and officials in the Lupaca kingdom, but the people of Lupaca had not yet been subjected to the encomienda by which Spaniards were granted large estates and control over indigenous peoples.

Like the Incas and many other Andean peoples, the Lupaca were divided into two moieties each with its leader. The "Alassa" or upper moiety was headed by Qari and the lower moiety, the "Massaa" was headed by Kusi. Each of them directly controlled many of the people and much of the land in the kingdom, but other wealthy Lupaca also incited the envy of the Spanish chronicler. The Lupaca seemed "extraordinarily wealthy."

== The vertical archipelago ==
The Lupaca lived on the Altiplano, a high cold plateau dotted with mountains. Lake Titicaca is at an altitude of 3,812 metres (12,507 ft); freezes occur every month of the year. Only about two percent of land in the Andean highlands is arable. A few crops -- potatoes, oca, olluco, and quinoa—can be grown in favored locations with techniques such as terracing, raised beds, and Waru Waru to moderate the cold temperatures. The wealth of the Lupaca was their herds of llamas and alpacas which grazed the barren uplands up to the snowline at about 4,800 metres (15,700 ft).

Anthropologist John V. Murra used the Lupaca as his exemplar of what he called the "vertical archipelago". The Lupaca and other high-altitude Andean people countered the limited potential for agriculture in their homeland by establishing colonies at lower and warmer elevations both westward toward the Pacific Ocean in the Chiribaya cultural area and eastward toward the Amazon River basin. The western colonies, located about 200 kilometres (120 miles) distant, were located in irrigated desert valleys in the Moquegua Region and provided agricultural products such as maize, cotton, and chili peppers to the Lupaca living on the Altiplano. The eastern colonies provided coca and a variety of tropical forest products. Communication with these outlying colonies was maintained via llama caravans. Sovereignty over non-contiguous areas appears to have been a characteristic of Andean kingdoms. The long distance control of the colonies by the Lupaca implies a safe environment for transport and travel.

Details of Murra's theory have been challenged, especially Murra's view that the vertical archipelago was a long-standing characteristic of highland peoples. Anthropologist Mary Van Buren suggests that the vertical archipelago as described by Murra operated only during the late Inca and early Spanish eras and further speculates that the establishment of colonies at lower elevations by the Lupaca and other highland peoples was motivated more by production of luxury goods rather than being a critical source of food for the entire highland population.

== Fate of the Lupaca ==
The Lupaca kingdom disappeared from Spanish records around the end of the 16th century and its people became submerged in the generalized Aymara population. The Spanish had increasingly asserted control over the Lupacas and other highland kingdoms, eroded the authority and influence of their traditional leaders, forced Aymaras to work in the silver mines of Potosí, to resettle in "reductions", and appropriated much of the former Lupaca land, especially the lowland agricultural areas of the vertical archipelago. Adding to these factors were recurrent epidemics of Old World diseases which took a heavy demographic toll of the Andean indigenous people.

== Archaeological sites ==
- Inka Tunuwiri
- Inka Uyu
- Cutimbo
- Mayqu Amaya
- Mulluq'u
- Q'inq'u
