= Colla–Inca War =

15th century military conflict

- Part of the Inca conquest of the Collao
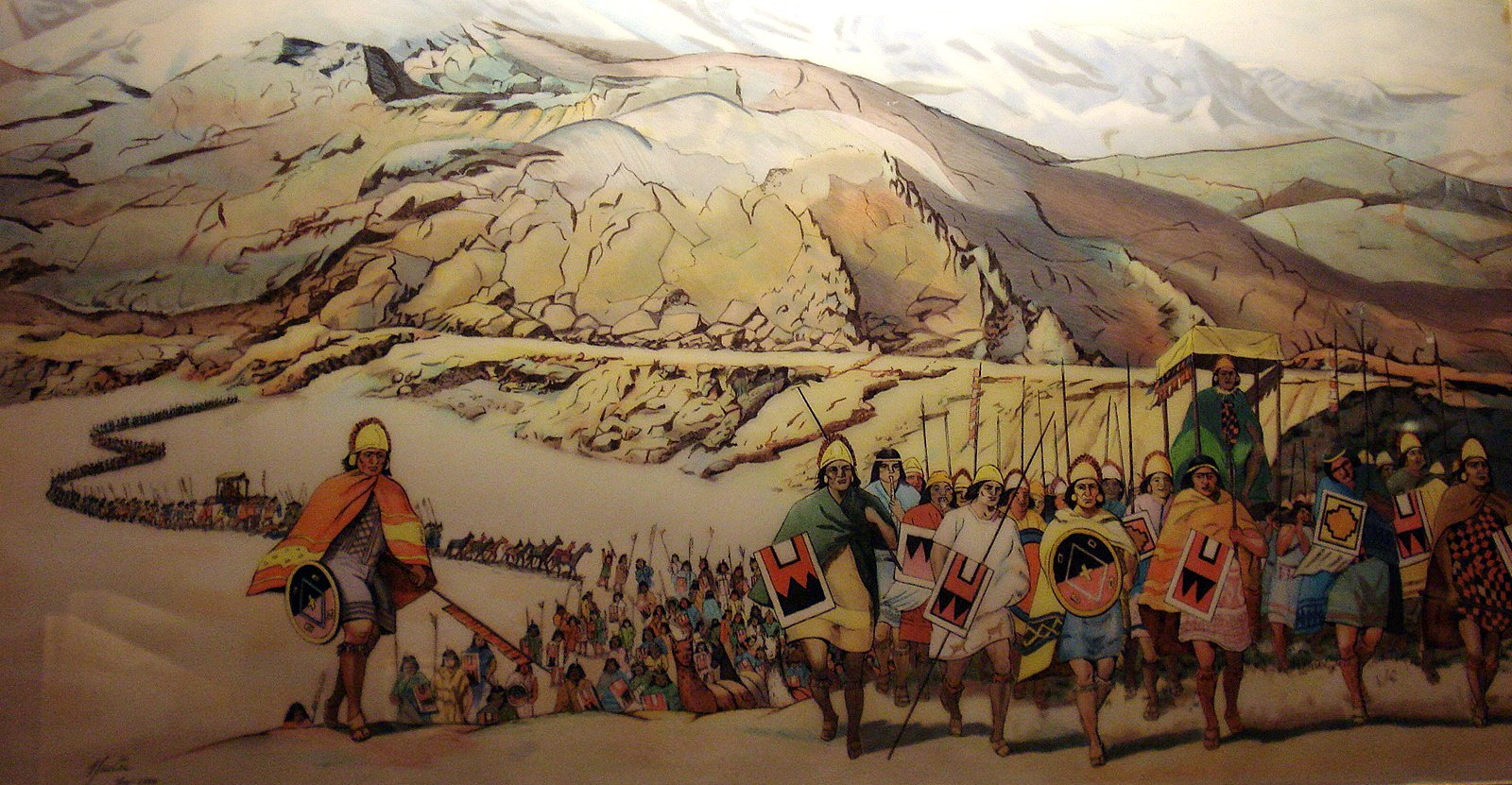
- The imperial army marching during the conquests of the Inca empire
Date	1445–1450
Location	Altiplano
Result	Incan victory; End of the Colla Kingdom; Quechuanization of the Colla Kingdom; Inca dominion is established in the Andean Plateau

Belligerents
Inca Empire: Incan Army	Colla Kingdom: Colla Army; Aymara Army

Commanders and leaders
Pachacútec	Chuchi Capac (POW) (executed)

Strength
est. 12,000 troops	est. 300,000 troops

Casualties and losses
est. 500 killed	est. 700,000 killed

The Colla–Inca War or Incan conquest of the Colla Kingdom was a military conflict fought between the Inca Empire and the Colla Kingdom between 1445 and 1450. It is one of the first wars of conquest led by Pachacuti.

The Colla chiefdom was a powerful polity in the altiplano area, covering a large territory. However, multiple chiefs, possibly semi-autonomous, most likely ruled over the territory.

The war took place following the conquest of Sora and Chanka territories, in the context of longer lasting conflicts between Incas and Collas, which started with the reign of Viracocha Inca.

It established Inca dominance in the Andean Altiplano, and made the Inca an important entity in the Peruvian and Bolivian Andes. Inca dominance was contested during the beginning of Inca rule however, several revolts having threatened Inca power.

== Attribution of the conquest ==
While some chroniclers, including Inca Garcilaso de la Vega and Felipe Guaman Poma de Ayala, claimed that under the fourth inca Mayta Capac's reign, parts of Collasuyu (a region comprising a larger territory than the colla chiefdom alone) were already conquered, most other chroniclers and local sources state Pachacuti conquered these regions. According to the Inca functionaries of the Relation of the Quipucamayoc, of the lineage of Viracocha Inca, the latter conquered the territory. Inca Garcilaso de la Vega associated the conquest of the colla chiefdom in particular to the third Inca ruler, Lloque Yupanqui.

One narrative stated that Pachacuti personally led the expedition, while another one, supported by the Spanish chronicler Pedro Cieza de León, stated that the Inca emperor had sent two Chanka generals, only later visiting the region.

== Background ==
The first conflicts with the colla started with the reign of Viracocha Inca. Rivalries had broken out between the Lupaca ruler, Cari, and the colla chiefdom. Viracocha, who was publicly supportive of the Qollas, secretly conducted an alliance with Cari. Because of this, the colla ruler attacked the lupaca before the arrival of the Inca, and the Lupaca were victorious in a battle near Paucarcolla, while the Inca subjugated the Canas and Canchis. The triple alliance of Incas, Canas and Lupacas won the war.

The Inca state had acquired geo-political importance in the Andes following their victory over the Chanka. However the Inca needed to conquer the Colla Kingdom, before they could continue north. The material need for bronze tools to keep their conquests was potentially another cause for the war, since the region was an important producer of bronze.

The chronicler Pedro Cieza de Leon mentioned a large number of titles used by Colla rulers, leading the Peruvian ethno-historian María Rostworowski to assert that multiple chiefs ruled the territory. For the anthropologist Elizabeth Arkush, archeological evidence suggests the aymara kingdoms mentioned in colonial sources were, in pre-Inca times, politically fragmented territories and not unified chiefdoms, contrary to chronicler's assertions.

== War ==
It is generally accepted that the conquest of the northwestern shore of Lake Titicaca, comprising the Colla chiefdom and the Lupaca chiefdom, was conquered under the reign of Pachacuti. According to Martti Pärssinen, Pachacuti continued conquering beyond the Desaguadero River, until around Lake Poopó, while John Howland Rowe wrote that the Desaguadero represented the southern Inca border during Pachacuti's reign, conquests south of the river happening later, according to him.

Before the conquest of the Collas, the Inca Empire had conquered the Andahuaylas region, and, during Pachacuti's first military campaign, the Soras, the Rucanas, the Chalcos, the Vilcas, the Chinchas, the Huamangas, and Vilcashuamán. According to some sources, the Incas simultaneously organised an expedition to Jauja. The border between the Colla and Inca was at Vilcanota.

According to one version of the story, Pachacuti personally led the campaign against the Colla. The Inca sent his general Apo Conde Mayta to the border with the Collas, before joining the vanguard troops. The Colla chief waited for the Inca forces at the town of Ayaviri. A battle ensued, which the Inca won. The colla chief, Chuchic Capac, was captured, following a direct attack by Pachacuti and his guard, and his territories were annexed into the Inca Empire.

Following the battle, Pachacuti traveled to the Colla capital, Hatuncolla. There he organized the Inca administration, and ordered the construction of forts. Following the Inca invasion, the neighboring Lupaca chiefdom also submitted. During the campaign, Pachacuti visited the ruins of Tiahuanaco.

== Consequences ==
The war established Inca imperial status, and significantly increased the reputation of the emperor Pachacuti. Under the reigns of Pachacuti and his successor, Tupac Yupanqui, however, the region revolted several times, one important revolt taking place while the Inca was campaigning in the east, and only under the reign of Huayna Capac were the peoples of the Altiplano integrated into the Inca state.
