= Colla Kingdom =

South American chiefdom

- c. 1150–c. 1463
- Capital: Hatunqulla (Urcosuyu), Azángaro (Umasuyu)
- Common languages: Puquina, Aymara
- Other languages: Uru, Quechua
- Government: Diarchy
- Historical era: Late Intermediate
  - Established: c. 1150
  - Conquered by the Inca Empire under Pachacuti: c. 1463
  - Revolt crushed by Topa Inca Yupanqui: c. 1483
Preceded by	Succeeded by
Tiwanaku Empire	Inca Empire

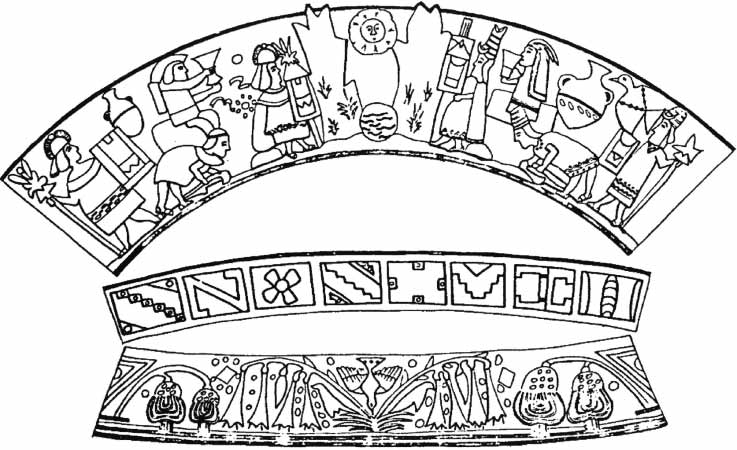
Encounter between the Sapan Inca, on the left, and the Hatun Qolla, seated on the right.

The Colla, Qolla or Qulla Kingdom, chiefdom or Señorio was a polity established in the northwestern basin of lake Titicaca. It was a segmentary society, containing many lineages and subgroups.

The Colla chiefdom was one of the Aymara kingdoms that occupied part of the Collao plateau after the fall of Tiwanaku. In the mid-15th century the Collas possessed a vast territory, one of the largest of the Aymara kingdoms, which at the time the 9th Sapan Inka Pachakutiq Yupanqui Qhapaq the Intipchurin ("son of the sun"), conquered along with other political entities in the region. Often described as a powerful, unified state, archeological data indicates a more politically fragmented landscape, covered by defensive forts, called pukaras.

The Colla chiefdom was one of the most important altiplano chiefdoms, covering 20.000 square kilometres, and claiming heritage from the Tiwanaku civilisation. Linguistically, the Colla nation spoke Puquina, possibly the language of Tiwanaku prior to its collapse.

During Inca rule, the Qullasuyu region was named after the Colla chiefdom, but referred to a larger territory, comprising all the Aymara kingdoms, because the Incas used the term "colla" to describe the entirety of the Aymara population.

== Organization ==
The Colla ruler had the title of Capac Colla or Chuchi Capac. He was also called Zapana, while the ruler of Azangaro was called Humalla. The title Colla Capac was most likely used to designate many individuals in the course of history, and was not a personal name. The queen of the puquina speaking part was called Capac Comege, "Rich mother", from "capac", rich, and "ome", mother. The puquina speaking lord had the honorary title of Capac Capaapoyndichuri, "king and only lord son of the sun".

Capac was a term used by the Incas to refer to a hereditary status, linked to the supernatural (in Cusco, the term referred to royal Incas), and it can be used to describe powerful foreign chiefs, equal to the Inca. A ruler adopting the title was seen as an act of provocation. Capac was most likely an Inca term often used to describe the structures and practices of foreign peoples similar to the Inca's.

=== Capital ===
The pre-Inca capital of the Colla chiefdom recorded by colonial ethno-historic documents was Hatunqulla. However, recent archeological research suggests the city was built during Inca rule.

Sillustani was maybe an ethnic centre of the collas.

=== Uma and Urco division ===
The territory was organised into two regions by an imaginary line : Urcosuyu (Urco: male, fire) and Umasuyu (Uma: female, water). The capital was Hatunqulla, i.e. "Colla, the Great" located 34 km north of Puno in the Urcusuyu and was ruled by the dynasty of the Zapanas. The capital of the Umasuyu was Azangaro, which depended on Hatunqulla. This form of government based on duality was characteristic of the central Andean societies, in which two complementary halves of the territory exist, but one still ruled over the other.

According to Thérèse Bouysse-Cassagne, the eastern half Umasuyu was a puquina linguistic centre, while the western half Urcosuyu contained less puquina speakers. The linguistic division was not important in Inca and colonial times, however.

The Umasuyu Qollas had the Titicaca Island in their territory, Bernabe Cobo having written: "Titikaka Island ...was formerly populated with Indian Qollas, the same nation of Copacabana natives". Alonso Ramos Gavilan noted: "the Qollas of Titikaka had this famous altar and shrine, it was a waka from the puquina qollas and uroqollas".

=== Territorial unity ===
According to the Peruvian ethno-historian María Rostworowski, the multitude of titles indicates that more than one kuraka (chief) ruled in Colla territory. The anthropologist Elizabeth Arkush, basing herself on archeological findings, finds that the Colla chiefdom was politically fragmented in multiple sets of defensive structures, called pukaras. Sets of pukaras were allied because of their proximity, enabling them to give alert signals in case of danger. According to her, "current archeological findings suggest that there was no unified Colla Señorio, but a series of groups or subregional confederations". According to Charles Stanish, the Late Intermediate Period, which lasted from 1000 to 1450, was marked by politically fragmented segmentary societies, which associated with regional ethnic identities based on supposed kinship ties, creating large social-territorial structures. According to Thérèse Bouysse-Cassagne, the vast Colla territory "was gradually divided into different chiefdoms when the empire collapsed, without all its prestigious waka and traditions having been completely destroyed".

The establishment of pukaras, defensive structures situated in high altitudes and far from sources of water, suggests that armed conflicts within Colla territory were frequent. By associating with principal pukaras, small pukaras were able to secure their safety. Other than Hatunqulla, other, semi-autonomous, centres of political power existed, mainly situated in the eastern Uma half of the territory, notably Azangaro, Callavaya, Moho, Chuquicache, Oruro and Asillo.

There were forty-one regional groups within the Colla chiefdom. These small socio-territorial units are dispersed through the two halves of Colla territory, and are composed of various ayllus (local communities), called hatas in this region, one of which ruled over the others.

The Urco half contained the "nations" or "provinces" of Hatuncolla, Caracoto, Juliaca, Nicasio, Lampa, Cabana, Cabanilla, Mañazo, Ullagachi, Paucarcolla, Capachica and Coata.

Umasuyu was composed of the "nations" Azangaro, Asillo, Arapa, Ayaviri, Saman, Taraco, Caquijana, Chupa, Achaya, Caminaca, Carabuco, Cancara, Moho, Conima, Ancoraimes, Huaycho, Huancasi, Huancané, Achacachi, and Copacabana.

Within the realm of the Qulla were three ethnic groups: Aymara, Puquina and Uro (some Uros spoke Puquina and others Uruquilla). Felipe Guaman Poma de Ayala clearly distinguished these ethnic groups and identified the Aymaras as Qolla, the Puquinas as Puquina Qolla and the Uros as Uru Qolla.

== History ==
The Wari and Tiwanaku civilisations.

Around 1000, the civilisation centred around the ancient city of Tiwanaku disappeared, maybe because of ecological conditions, and parts of the population undertook migrations between 1050 and 1150, starting from the lake Titicaca bassin and spreading throughout the entire altiplano and pacific coast. The era following the collapse of Tiwanaku, called "Late Intermediate Period", was marked by high political instability. According to the colonial chroniclers, the Qolla chiefdom expanded its domain, and its components slowly formed a Qolla state. Because of the organised nature attributed to them, the Altiplano chiefdoms were sometimes described as "Kingdoms" by colonial writings. However, according to the anthropologist Elizabeth Arkush, archeological findings near lake Titicaca deny the concept of a consolidation process for a Qolla state.

The Qollas inherited important religious traditions of a feline aquatic sun, Viracocha, represented by the sacred lake Titicaca and its islands, notably Isla del Sol, where state activity had started under Tiwanaku around 650 and increased between 800 and 950. These islands were linked to mines that exploited gold and silver, notably the Potosí mine.

Abandoning the system of high fields adopted by Tiwanaku, the Qollas built defensive structures, called Pukaras. Between 1000 and 1275, the Qollas abandoned their isolated residences in the mountains, establishing themselves in defensive agro-pastoral complexes, and, while a local elite started to emerge, focused on communitarian work. The first pukara forts were established in small number from the year 1000 onward, and were small, unfortified, and could only momentarily shelter small populations. The colla chiefdom was organised in a segmentary manner, where a hierarchical system of groups, lineages and semi-autonomous local entities existed, that were attached to political centres.

=== 14th century conflicts ===
After 1300, pukaras became common in the region, and often had a residential function. To protect local populations, alliances of small and medium-sized pukaras formed around large pukaras, the latter becoming political centres of power. Between 1300 and 1450, regional conflicts took place in the region, forcing populations to retreat to pukaras for protection, since societies did not have sufficient capacities to undertake long sieges.

The causes of the 14th century conflicts, that spread through the entire Andes, are uncertain. According to the linguist and anthropologist Alfredo Torrerro, an invasion of aymara people against those who speak puquina or uru caused the conflicts. For César Itier and Paul Hegarty, however, it was the Incas who spread the Aymara language, and the archaeologist Juan Albarracín-Jordán, on the contrary, finds that aymaras were already in the altiplano in the time of Tiwanaku. The anthropologist Elizabeth Arkush finds that a multitude of factors, notably drought and other environmental conditions, caused conflicts. According to her, the military chiefs, called sinchis, conserved a state of permanent conflict in order to acquire an important position in local hierarchies, by redistributing the war booty to the community. Other potential causes were the efficiency of pukara forts — Colla chiefs having been incapable of long sieges or surprise attacks —, and the chiefdom's segmentary organisation, which encouraged inter-group rivalries.

At the level of large chiefdoms, the Collas maintained rivalries, possibly linked to cultural and linguistic differences, with the Lupaqas, to the south, and the Canas and Canchis, to the north.

=== Potosí mines and sacred Titicaca islands ===
The Colla chiefs, who were related to the sun cult, had ruled over various sacred islands inside lake Titicaca as well as the silver mines of Potosí and the gold mines of Carabaya. The islands and the mines were linked to particular religious beliefs. The Qolla population of Carabaya worshiped a mottled feline, that would have supplied them with gold. The Qolla chiefdoms of Capachica and Coata were the owners of several Titicaca islands, notably the Isla del Sol, Taquile and Amantani.

=== Coastal colonies ===
The Qolla, Lupaqa, Pacasa and Azangaro chiefdoms of the highlands possessed colonies in the southern coastal region of Colesuyu. These enclaves were used to have access to different Andean eco-zones.

The reasons for the subordination of coastal chiefdoms are uncertain, military conquest being a possibility.

=== Conflict with the Lupaqas ===
The Colla chiefdom and the Lupaqa chiefdom developed a rivalry, potentially linked to linguistic differences (the Lupaqas spoke an Aymara language, while the Qollas spoke Puquina). The anthropologist Alfredo Torrerro places the beginning of the conflict in the 14th century, at the time of important Aymara migrations. According to him, the Lupaqas represented the new Aymara ethnicities, while the Qollas represented the ancient Puquina population. During the reign of Viracocha Inca, ruler of the growing Cusco confederation, the Incas publicly gave their support to the two main Colla chiefs, but secretly made an alliance with the Lupaqa ruler, named Cari. Learning of the alliance, the ruler of Hatunqulla invaded Lupaqa territory, but was defeated in a battle at Paucarcolla. The Inca armies arrived after the confrontation, and conducted a pact with Cari. The meeting between the two rulers took place in Chucuito, where they swore eternal peace by sharing a kero of chicha as a symbol of their friendship. The kero was transported to a temple by priests in the middle of dances and music being performed to commemorate the event.

According to the Inca functionaries in the Relation of the Quipucamayoc, who belonged to Viracocha Inca's lineage Socso panaca, this event, which saw the occupation of the Isla del Sol, represented an Inca conquest of the Qollas.

=== Visit to Cusco ===
The chronicler Juan de Santa Cruz Pachacuti Yamqui Salcamayhua reported that the Colla ruler visited the ruler of Cusco Inca Viracocha, following his accession to power. During the coronation, the Colla chief addressed his congratulations to Viracocha Inca. According to Thérèse Bouysse-Cassagne, the speech of the Colla chief made reference to a religious and symbolic dualism, linked to Colla mines. Collas were linked to the Sun and to silver, while the Incas were associated with the creator deity Viracocha and gold.

=== Inca conquest ===
Following the invasion of the Soras and Chankas, Pachacuti began his expansionist military campaign to the Collao, sending a group of soldiers under the command of Apo Conde Mayta towards the border with the Colla Kingdom, the powerful group that had as lord Chuchi Capac, also known as the Colla Capac. It didn't take long for Pachacuti to join the vanguard troops, entering in enemy lands until reaching the base of the Vilcanota.

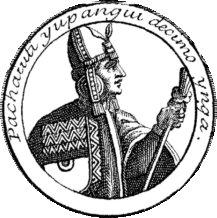
Colonial representation of the ninth Sapa Inca Pachacuti

The Colla Capac, aware of the Inca incursion into his territory, went with his army to the town of Ayaviri to wait for them. Upon arriving at this town, Pachacuti understood that a peaceful subjection wouldn't be possible, so a long battle ensued. As the fight was prolonged, fearing to be defeated, the Collas retreated to Pucara, an Andean fortification, where they were persecuted by the Incas. In Pucara the second battle was fought, in which not only were the Incas victorious, but they also managed to take prisoner the powerful Colla Capac. Once ensured the victory, Pachacútec went to Hatunqulla, home of the defeated curaca (chief), where he remained until all the subordinate peoples came to render obedience. The conquest of the Colla chiefdom gave an imperial stature to the Inca state, and significantly increased the reputation of the emperor Pachacuti.

==== Revolts ====
Following Inca conquest, the Colla chiefdom revolted multiple times, three according to the chronicler Pedro Sarmiento de Gamboa. The military structures known as pukaras were centres of resistance, and the revolts were "one of several [serious matters] that periodically menaced the Empire". One revolt was repressed by Amaru Yupanqui, son of Pachacuti, while another one was taken down by the tenth Sapa Inca Tupac Yuapanqui. At this time, Tupac Yupanqui also conquered the independent Colla chiefdoms Conima, Conima, Moho, Assillo and Azangaro, of the Eastern Umasuyu half. From there, Inca armies advanced into the Callahuaya chiefdom, on the south-eastern border of the Colla polity, and concluded an alliance with the eastern Puquina speaking peoples. A Kallawaya chief, called Ari Capac Iqui, showed the Inca armies the path through the Apolo valleys to Antisuyu, and became an important Inca ally.

=== Inca era ===
In the Inca era, the formerly disobedient sites of Azangaro, Asillo, and Pucara were part of the Inca ruler's domain, while Arapa was part of the sun deity Inti's domain. In a strategy of integrating the colla peoples, pukaras (forts) were reused by the Incas, who neutralised the defensive structures and established an Inca administration. Part of the Colla territory, on the northern coast of lake Titicaca, was governed from Cusco, and another one, on the eastern coast of the lake, was governed from La Paz. During the reign of Huayna Capac, the participation of the Kolla peoples in the northern campaigns of the emperor contributed to integrating them in the Inca state. To thank the Kallawaya chief Ari Capac Iqui, the Incas created an Inca-Kallawaya province on the eastern bank of lake Titicaca.

After the Collas were conquered by the Inca Empire, most pukara forts were abandoned. The Puquina-Qollas and the Uru-Qollas were expelled from the sacred Isla del Sol by Tupac Yupanqui, and sent to Lupaca territory. Tupac Yupanqui appointed his uncle Sucsu (or Socso) as governor of Qullasuyu and priest of the sun, banned Qollas from important state festivals, and implanted a policy of discovering mines, which were linked to the cult of Viracocha. In order to establish a link between Tiwanaku and the Incas, the Inca state appropriated Qolla cultural traditions, and claimed to originate from lake Titicaca.

The human sacrifices or capacocha conducted in the mines and near lake Titicaca strengthened political alliances and were part of social, religious and economic "reciprocity" in the Inca state.

=== Colonial era ===
The peoples of the eastern parts of the Qolla, Cana, Pacaje and Kallawaya chiefdoms were recruited to work in the Larecaja and Carabaya mines.

Because the majority of Christian evangelisers learned Quechua and Aymara, religious traditions survived in Puquina speaking parts of the lake Titicaca area, notably the Kallawaya curing practices and other traditions related to the sacred mines. Kallawaya curers provided miners with psychotropic drugs.

== Religion ==
=== Viracocha ===
Under the Tiwanaku state, the Isla del Sol ("Island of the Sun") acquired an important status in the Tiwanaku state, at the same time metallurgy developed in the region. According to the anthropologist and linguist Alfredo Torrerro, the Qollas worshipped a divinity that was the synthesis of Viracocha, the creator deity, and Wari, the sun deity. In Inca mythology, César Itier finds that the sun deity Inti was the double (huauque) and the receptacle of Viracocha, the latter being nocturnal sun which represented the "groundwater which supplied all of the local hydrographic networks". According to Thérèse Bouysse-Cassagne, the Incas appropriated the aquatic Titicaca Sun, in order to establish a link between the Inkas and Tiwanaku, by claiming to have originated from the Isla del Sol before migrating to Cusco. To worship the Titicaca deity, often represented with feline traits, aquatic sacrifices (capacochas) were practiced in Inca times for lake Titicaca. It is possible that the modern tradition of herbal medicine of the Kallawaya was related to earlier Tiwanaku and Qolla traditions.

In order to control the cult, the Incas established an important religious center in Copacabana.

=== Sacred mines ===
The mines of the eastern part of the territory were worshiped as wakas, and "strong metaphorical relations had been established between felines and mining, along with the sun as bestower of wealth". A mottled feline called Choquechinchay was notably worshiped, which would have supplied the inhabitants of the Carabaya mine with gold. Another feline, called Titi, was worshipped on the Isla del Sol in lake Titicaca, and was associated with sacred stones.

== See also ==
- Qullaw
- Qullasuyu
- Sillustani
- Puno Region
- Aymara people
- Uru people
- Qulla people
- Lupaca nation
