= Chucuito (disambiguation) =

Chucuito is a village in Peru.

Chucuito may also refer to:

- Chucuito District, a district in the Puno Province, Peru
- Chucuito Province, a province in the Puno Region, Peru
