= Moho =

Moho may refer to:

== Birds ==
- Moho (genus), an extinct genus of birds in the family Mohoidae
- The Hawaiian name of the Hawaiian rail, an extinct species
- The Māori name of the North Island takahē, an extinct species
- A local name for the oriole warbler, Hypergerus atriceps

== Computers ==
- Moho (software), 2D animation software also formerly sold as Anime Studio
- MoHo (video game), a 2000 Dreamcast game by Take-Two Interactive

== Geology and geography ==
- Mohe City, China, formerly romanized as "Moho"
- Moho discontinuity, the boundary between the Earth's crust and the mantle
- Moho, Puno, a city in Peru
- Moho District, Peru
- Moho Province, Peru
- Moho River, in Guatemala and Belize

== Other uses ==
- Model of Human Occupation, a model of practice in occupational therapy
- Mount Holyoke College, a small, historically-women's liberal arts college in South Hadley, MA, USA
- Motorhome, a type of vehicle used for recreational travel.
- The fictional planet Moho, from the video game Kerbal Space Program
