= Carlos Oquendo de Amat =

Peruvian poet

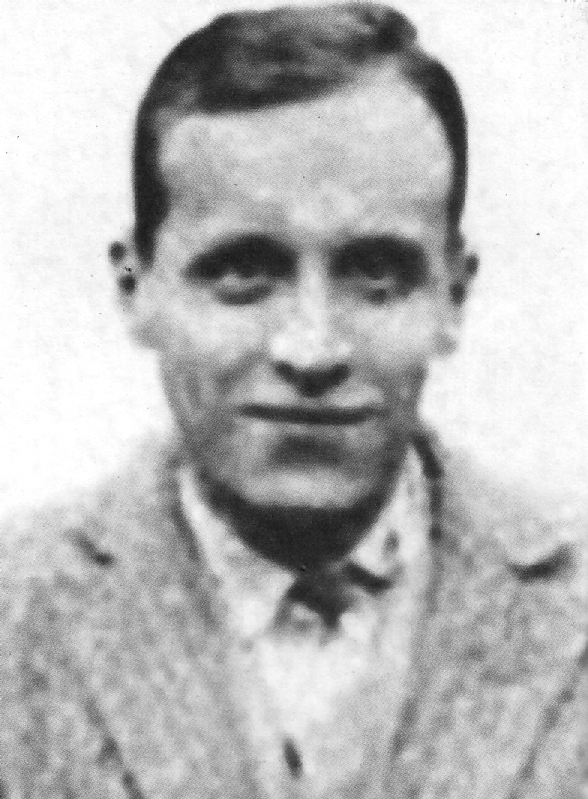
- Born: 17 April 1905; Moho, Puno, Peru
- Died: 6 March 1936 (aged 30); Guadarrama, Spain
- Occupations: Writer, poet
- Writing career
- Period: 20th century
- Genre: Poetry
- Notable work: 5 Meters of Poems (1927)
- Movement: Avant-garde

Carlos Oquendo de Amat (April 17, 1905 – March 6, 1936) was a Peruvian poet born in Moho, generally recognized by his only book of poetry 5 Meters of Poems, first published in 1927, which is an accordion book or pop-up book which extends to approximately 5 meters in length when fully opened. In the words of Urayoán Noel "5 Meters of Poems is a joy to read, and a significant contribution to our understanding of Latin American vanguard poetry beyond such canonical figures as Neruda and Vallejo. Here’s hoping for many more meters!".

== Works ==
- 5 Metros de Poemas, Editorial Minerva, Lima: 1927 (first edition).
- Five Meters of Poems, translated by David M. Guss with woodcuts by Antonio Frasconi, Turkey Press, Isla Vista, California, 1986.
- 5 Metros de Poemas, Ediciones El Taller del Libro, Madrid: 2004. ISBN 84-933844-1-0
- 5 metros de Poemas / 5 Metros de Poesie, translated by Riccardo Badini, In Forma di Parole poetry review, Italy, 2002.
- 5 Meters of Poems, Spanish-English bilingual edition, translated by Joshua Beckman and Alejandro de Acosta, Ugly Duckling Presse, Brooklyn, New York, 2010. ISBN 978-1-933254-59-3
- 5 Metrelik Şiir, translated by Tolgay Hiçyılmaz, Plüton Yayın, Istanbul, 2023. ISBN 978-625-6892-30-9
