= Tephrite =

Igneous, volcanic rock

- Igneous rock
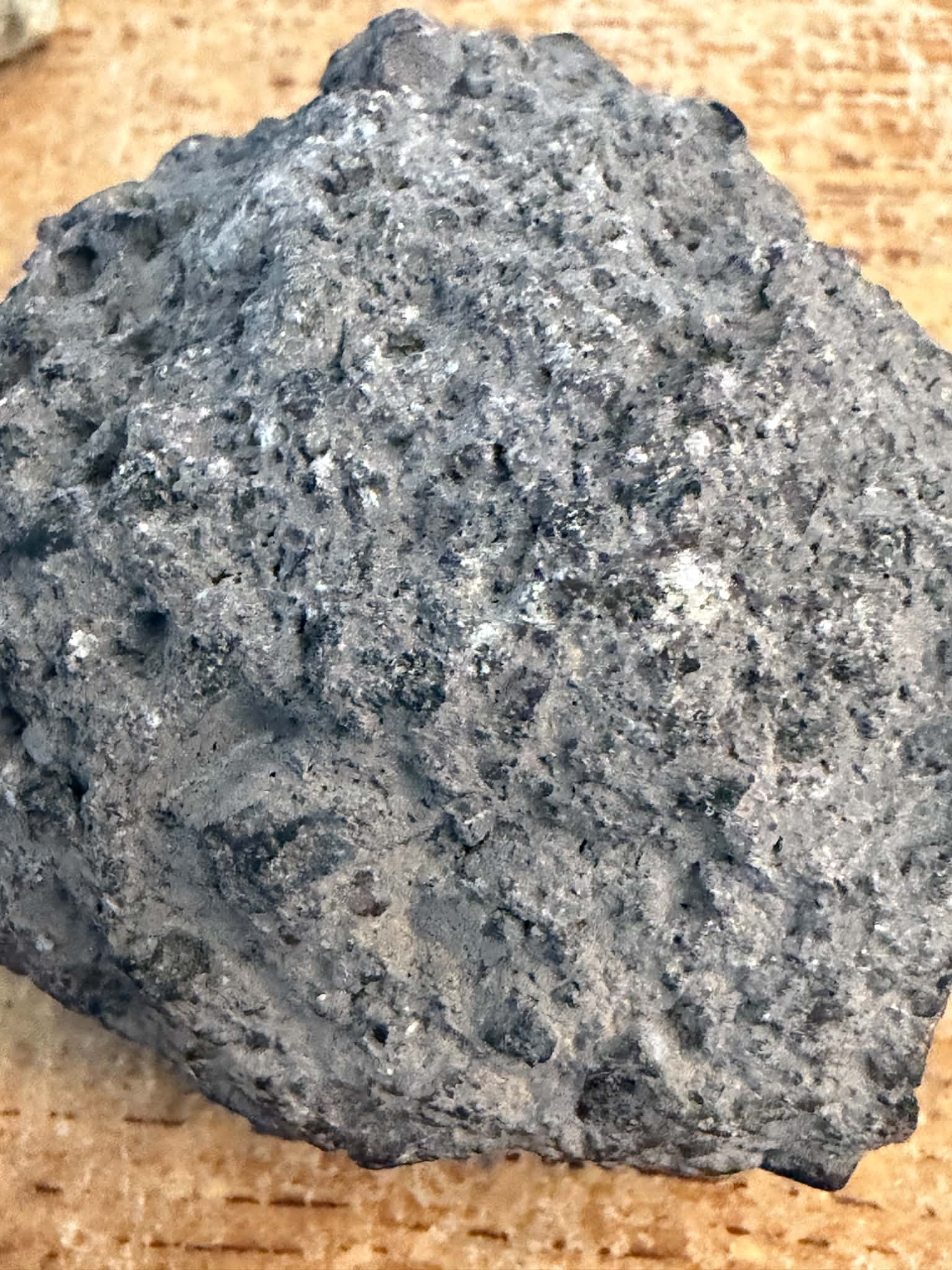
- Tephrite from Mount Vesuvius

Composition
- olivine, bytownite, leucite, basanite, augite, alkali feldspar, Potassium tephrite
- Texture: Fine-grained, sometimes Porphyritic
- Equivalents: diorite, gabbro

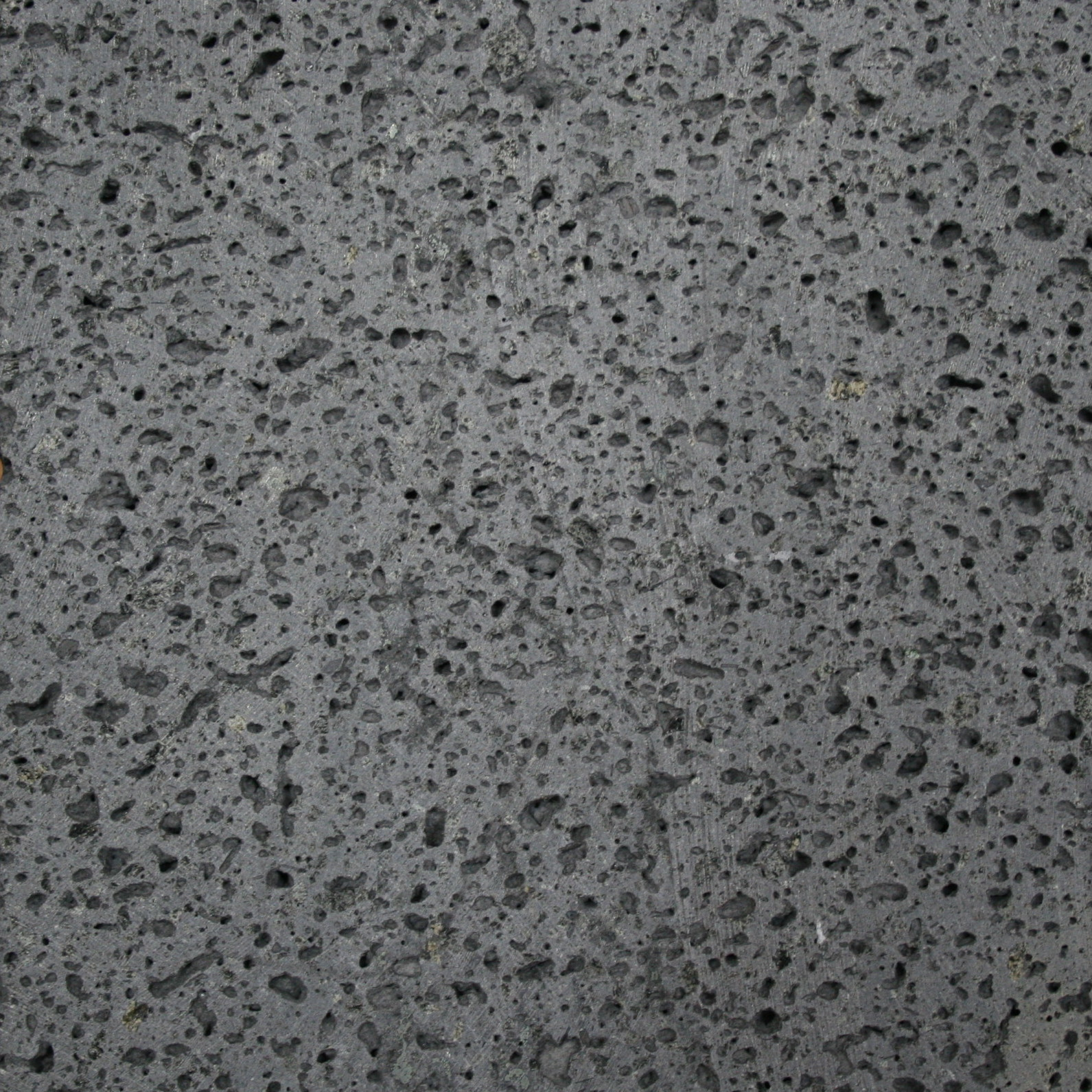
Leucite tephrite from Mayen, Eifel, Germany

Tephrite is an igneous, volcanic (extrusive) rock, with aphanitic to porphyritic texture. Mineral content is usually abundant feldspathoids (leucite or nepheline), plagioclase, and lesser alkali feldspar. Pyroxenes (clinopyroxenes) are common accessory minerals. Quartz is absent, and olivine may occur in minor amounts. Tephrite is distinguished from basanite by having less than 10% normative olivine in the CIPW norm.. Its parameters are defined in the QAPF diagram. Occurrences include leucite nepheline tephrite from Hamberg bei Neckarelz near Heidelberg, Germany,, leucite tephrite to phono-tephrite is common at Mount Vesuvius, phonolite-tephrite at Monte Vulture, Basilicata, Italy and basanite–tephrite intrusions in Namibia.

== Geology ==
Tephrite is a silica-undersaturated melt is characterized by nepheline-normative compositions. In the case of the Tenerife volcano located in the Canary Islands, tephrite starts as basanite in the mantle. Due to magma mixing in the mantle, tephrite is able to form. As basanite/tephrite approaches the Moho it is stored between 12-15 km deep at temperatures ~1050 C. It is then periodically replenished periodically by more basanite magma.

As tephrite accends upward through the crust, the tephrite intrudes into a shallow and zoned phonolitic storage system, triggering the disruption of a crystal mush in its base (bottom of the magma chamber). Prior to an eruption, geochemical distribution suggest that a mixing event takes place very shortly before the eruption, on a timescale of hours.

Once tephrite research the surface in an eruption, it can be very explosive. During the 2015 eruption Pico do Fogo in the Cape Verde Islands, tephritic lava was the primary igneous rock erupted. During the first day, the eruption was classifed by Hawaiian to more violent strombolian eruptive activity. Towards the end of the eruption, tephrite transitioned to phonotephrite, which is more viscous and explosive.
