= Tilali District =

Coordinates: 15.5166°S 69.3509°W

Tilali
- District
- Interactive map of Tilali
- Country: Peru
- Region: Puno
- Province: Moho
- Founded: December 12, 1991
- Capital: Tilali

Government
  - Mayor: Zenon Alan Cañazaca Blanco

Area
  - Total: 48.15 km^{2} (18.59 sq mi)
- Elevation: 3,840 m (12,600 ft)

Population (2005 census)
  - Total: 3,255
  - Density: 67.60/km^{2} (175.1/sq mi)
- Time zone: UTC-5 (PET)
- UBIGEO: 210904

Tilali District is one of four districts of the province Moho in Peru.

== Ethnic groups ==
The people in the district are mainly indigenous citizens of Aymara descent. Aymara is the language which the majority of the population (91.65%) learnt to speak in childhood, 7.60% of the residents started speaking using the Spanish language (2007 Peru Census).
