= Huayrapata District =

Coordinates: 15.3218°S 69.3460°W

Huayrapata Wayrapata
- District
- Interactive map of Huayrapata; Wayrapata
- Country: Peru
- Region: Puno
- Province: Moho
- Founded: December 12, 1991
- Capital: Huayrapata

Government
  - Mayor: Juan De Dios Cauna Chiara

Area
  - Total: 388.35 km^{2} (149.94 sq mi)
- Elevation: 3,870 m (12,700 ft)

Population (2005 census)
  - Total: 3,870
  - Density: 9.97/km^{2} (25.8/sq mi)
- Time zone: UTC-5 (PET)
- UBIGEO: 210903

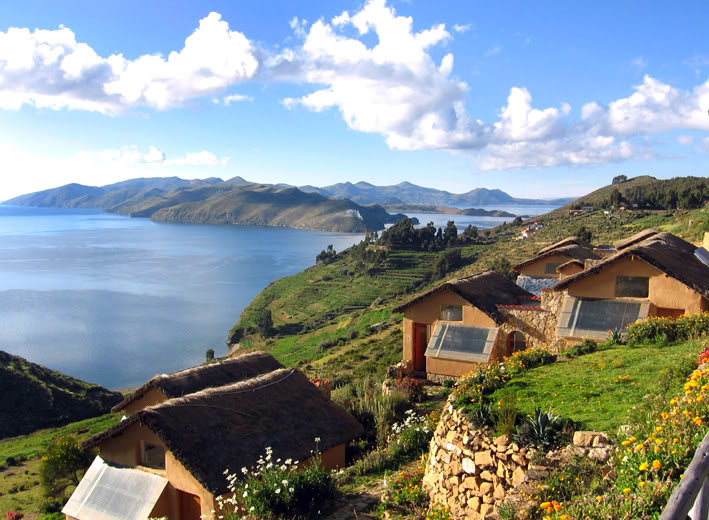

Huayrapata District is one of four districts of the province Moho in Peru.

== Ethnic groups ==
The people in the district are mainly indigenous citizens of Aymara descent. Aymara is the language which the majority of the population (95.14%) learnt to speak in childhood, 3.96% of the residents started speaking using the Spanish language (2007 Peru Census).
