= Mirq'imarka =

Archaeological site in Peru

- Location: Peru, Puno Region, Moho Province
- Region: Andes

Mirq'imarka (Aymara mirq'i old, broken, destroyed, marka village, "old or destroyed village", Hispanicized and mixed spellings Merquemarca, Merke Marka, Merquemarka) is an archaeological site in Peru. It is located in the Puno Region, Moho Province, Moho District. The site was declared a National Cultural Heritage (Patrimonio Cultural) of Peru by the National Institute of Culture.
