= Puno District =

Coordinates: 15.8396°S 70.0215°W

Puno
- District
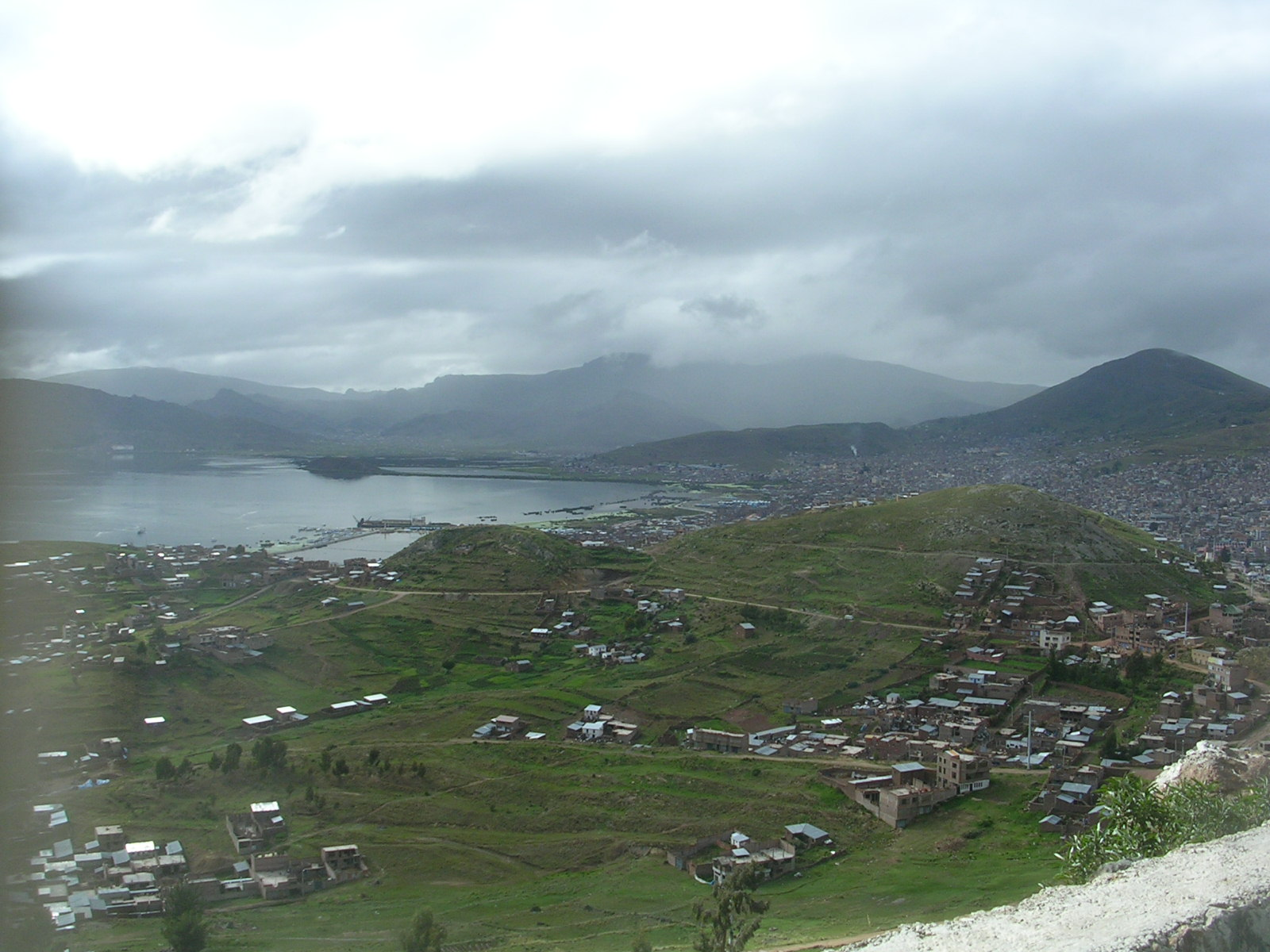
- Puno as seen from Puma Uta viewpoint

- Location of Puno in the Puno province
- Country: Peru
- Region: Puno
- Province: Puno
- Capital: Puno

Government
  - Mayor: Martín Ticona Maquera (2019 - 2022 )

Area
  - Total: 460.75 km^{2} (177.90 sq mi)
- Elevation: 3,827 m (12,556 ft)

Population (2017 census)
  - Total: 135,288
  - Density: 293.63/km^{2} (760.49/sq mi)
- Time zone: UTC-5 (PET)
- UBIGEO: 210101
- Website: munipuno.gob.pe

Puno District is one of the districts of the Puno Province in the Puno Region of Peru. Its seat is Puno.

== See also ==
- Inka Tunuwiri
- Mayqu Amaya
