= Aymara lordships =

Group of native polities in the Andes

Aymara kingdoms
- c. 1151–1477
- Capital: Hatunqulla (Collas), Cutimbo (Lupacas), Caquiaviri (Pacajes)
- Common languages: Aymara, Quechua
- Other languages: Puquina, Uru
- Government: Confederation of Diarchies
- Historical era: Late Intermediate
  - Established: c. 1151
  - Disestablished: 1477
Preceded by	Succeeded by
Tiwanaku Empire	Inca Empire
- Today part of: Bolivia

The Aymara lordships, Aymara kingdoms, or lake kingdoms were a group of native polities that flourished towards the Late Intermediate Period, after the fall of the Tiwanaku Empire, whose societies were geographically located in the Qullaw. They were developed between 1150 and 1477, before the kingdoms disappeared due to the military conquest of the Inca Empire. But the current Aymara population is estimated at two million located in the countries of Bolivia, Peru, Chile and Argentina. They used the Aymara and Puquina languages.

== Origin ==
During pre-colonial times these peoples were not known as Aymara, but were distinguished by the name of their own societies. The European chroniclers were the first to call these societies Aymara, but this name was not produced immediately because of the clear distinction between Aymara-speaking peoples.

Aymara people came from north Argentina, there were also Aymara descendant peoples in Lima, towards the end of the Wari Empire's heyday. A migration of Aymara peoples took place, one that contributed to the disarticulation of the imperial dominance of the region and, shortly after its disappearance, a number of Aymara-speaking, independent and rival kingdoms emerged. Some Aymara groups took advantage of the weakening of the Wari and settled on the central coast.

== The Kingdoms and Lordships ==
There were 12 major Aymara Kingdoms:

1. Canchis (Cusco)
2. Canas (Cusco)
3. Collas (Puno)
4. Lupacas (Puno)
5. Pacajes (La Paz)
6. Carangas (Oruro)
7. Soras (Oruro)
8. Charcas (Chuquisaca)
9. Quillacas (Potosí)
10. Cara-caras (Potosí)
11. Chuis (Sucre)
12. Chichas (Potosí)

There were also the following Aymara lordships:

1. Kallawaya (La Paz-Puno)
2. Yamparas (Sucre)

These kingdoms named, Urcosuyu (Urco: male, fire) on the western side of Lake Titicaca and Umasuyu (Uma: female, water) on the eastern side, geographically dominated a large number of territories in areas of lower altitude, both in the valleys of the Pacific and in the Amazon basin; they had discontinuous territories between the colonies in low areas like islands in various parts of the same valley, sharing the valley with other ethnic groups that could be local as well as other peoples of the highlands - a geopolitical phenomenon that John Murra calls "vertical archipelagos" - and although during the reign of the Inca Empire they kept both their lands in Qullaw and their colonies in the inter-Andean valleys; This domain of territory was respected until the first years of the Spanish conquest when its territorial and political dismemberment began.

In all these societies, duality prevailed as a form of government - there were two leaders for each society. Most of these kingdoms buried their leaders in a mausoleum in the shape of a tower called a "chullpa"; the design of these towers was different in each of the societies.

== The Incan conquest ==
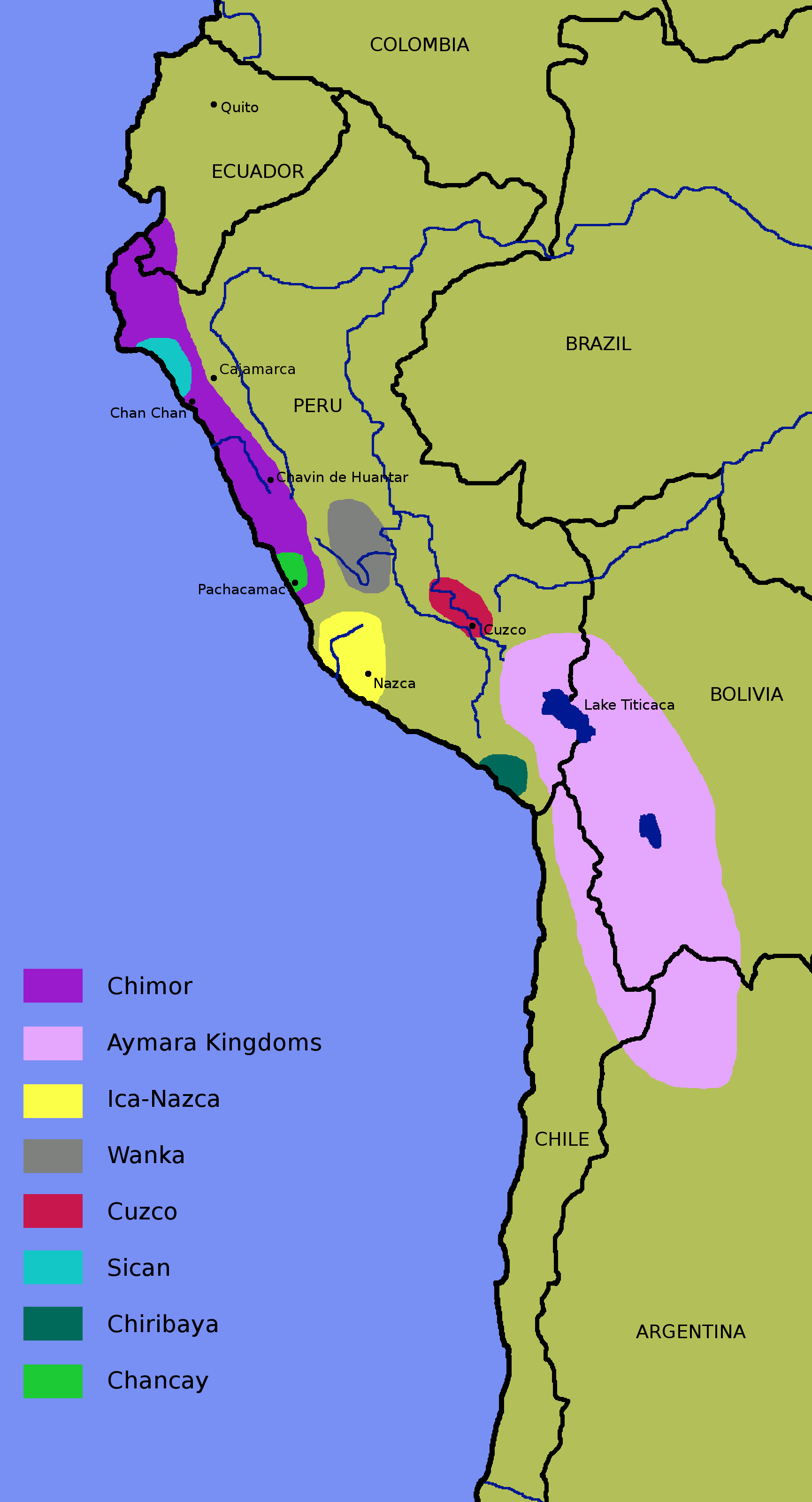
Major cultures in Peru in the Late Intermediate Period (1000–1400 CE) Chimor / Chimú culture Aymara kingdoms Ica-Nazca culture Huanca (Wanka) culture Kingdom of Cusco (Cuzco) Sican culture Chiribaya culture Chancay culture

Map of the Aymara language domain.

There were intense rivalries between the Aymara kurakas of Chucuito, from the Lupaca Kingdom, and Hatunqulla, from the Colla Kingdom. These confrontations were known to the Incas and the Viracocha Inca was the first to try to take advantage of these rivalries, promising aid to both sides but secretly agreeing with the Lupacas of Chucuito. This treason was discovered by Cari, the Colla leader, who attacked the Lupacas near Paucarcolla before the Inca army arrived to help them. With this victory the Collas became the dominant kingdom in all of Qullaw, annexing land along the Pacific.

Later Pachacuti defeated the Collas. The kuraka of the Collas at that time was called Chuqui Capac, he was taken prisoner by the Incas after a long battle near Hatunqulla. At the time of the conquest of the Collas, its territory spanned from the Pacific coast, passing through the Qullaw plateau, to Mojeños mountains in the east. After the capture of Chuqui Capac, all the Collas were subdued by the Incas, some by force and others peacefully; the towns that were destroyed were populated by mitmakunas and the other Aymara kingdoms ended up accepting the dominion of Cusco as did the Lupacas, Pacajes, Azangaros and others. After the expansion of the Inca empire into the land of the Aymara kingdoms, the Incas named all Aymara kingdoms "Collas", without distinction, and their territory became part of Collasuyo.
