= Chucuito District =

Coordinates: 15.9013°S 69.8970°W

Chucuito
- District
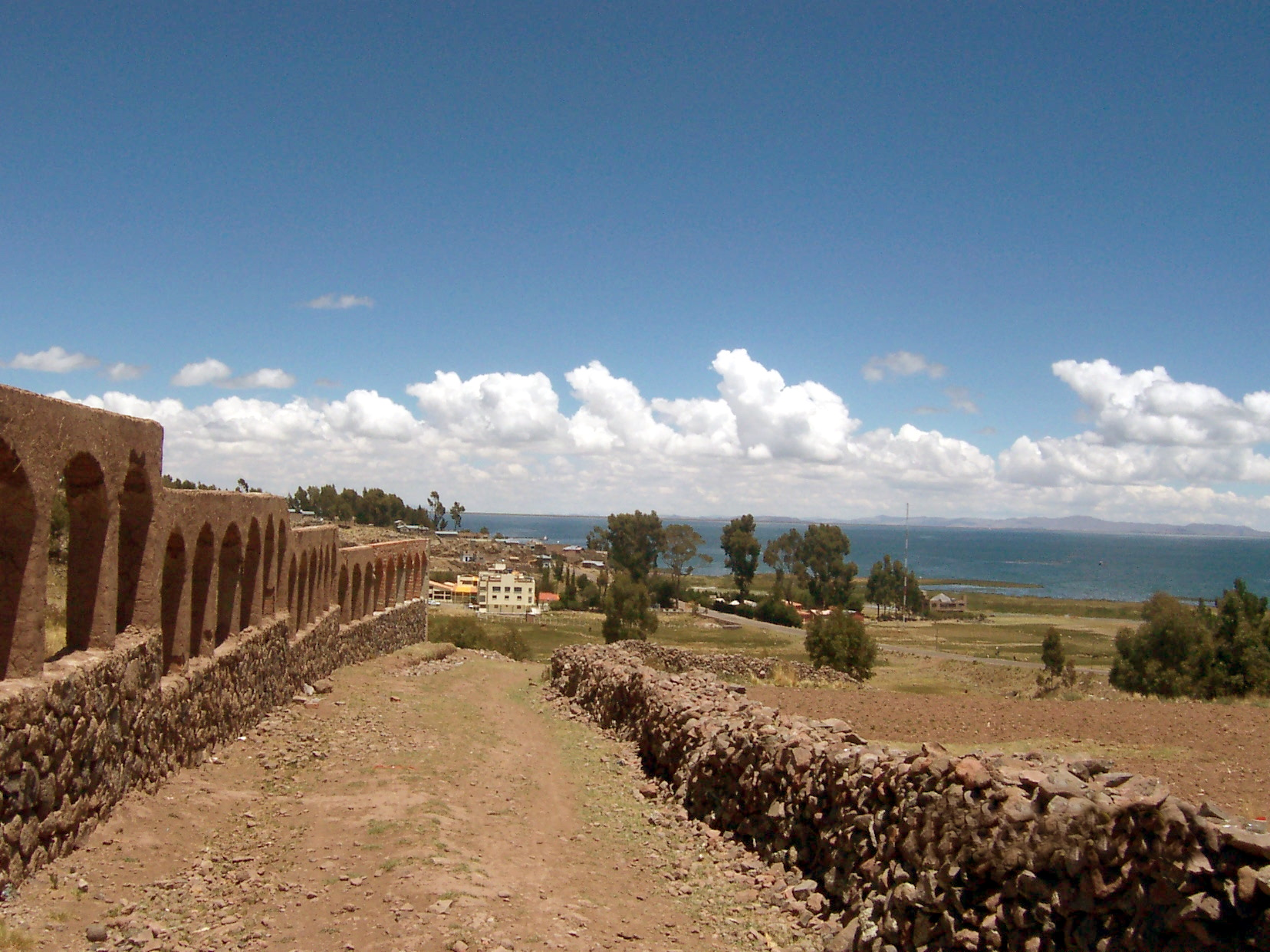
- Lake Titicaca as seen from Chucuito

- Coat of arms
- Interactive map of Chucuito
- Country: Peru
- Region: Puno
- Province: Puno
- Capital: Chucuito

Government
  - Mayor: Pedro Alfonso Teves Cruz

Area
  - Total: 121.18 km^{2} (46.79 sq mi)
- Elevation: 3,871 m (12,700 ft)

Population (2005 census)
  - Total: 9,366
  - Density: 77.29/km^{2} (200.2/sq mi)
- Time zone: UTC-5 (PET)
- UBIGEO: 210106
- Website: munichucuito.gob.pe

Chucuito District is one of the districts of the Puno Province in the Puno Region in Peru.

== Ethnic groups ==
The people in the district are mainly indigenous citizens of Aymara descent. Aymara is the language which the majority of the population (73.54%) learnt to speak in childhood, 23.71% of the residents started speaking using the Spanish language (2007 Peru Census).

== Images ==
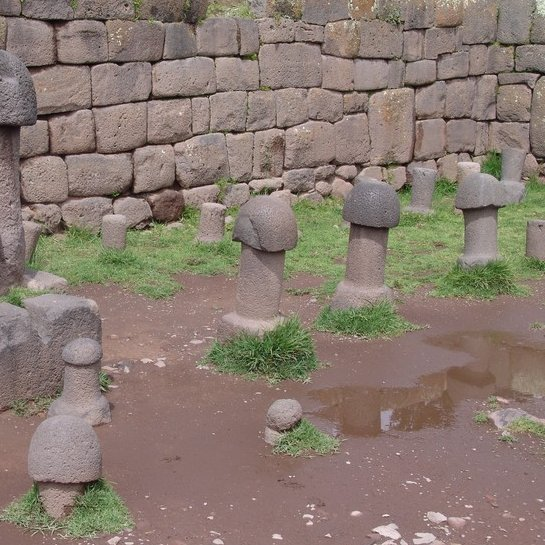
Phallus-shaped stone sculptures at Inka Uyu

== See also ==
- Inka Tunuwiri
- Inka Uyu
