= Inka Tunuwiri =

Archaeological site in Peru

Coordinates: 15.8700°S 69.9300°W

- Interactive map of Inka Tunuwiri
- Location: Peru, Puno Region, Puno Province
- Region: Andes

Inka Tunuwiri (Hispanicized spelling Incatunuhuiri) is an archaeological site in Peru. It is located in the Puno Region, Puno Province, between the districts Chucuito and Puno, southeast of the village Ichu. Inka Tunuwiri was declared a National Cultural Heritage (Patrimonio Cultural) of Peru by the National Institute of Culture.

== See also ==
- Inka Uyu
