= Moho District =

Coordinates: 15.3606°S 69.4997°W

Moho
- District
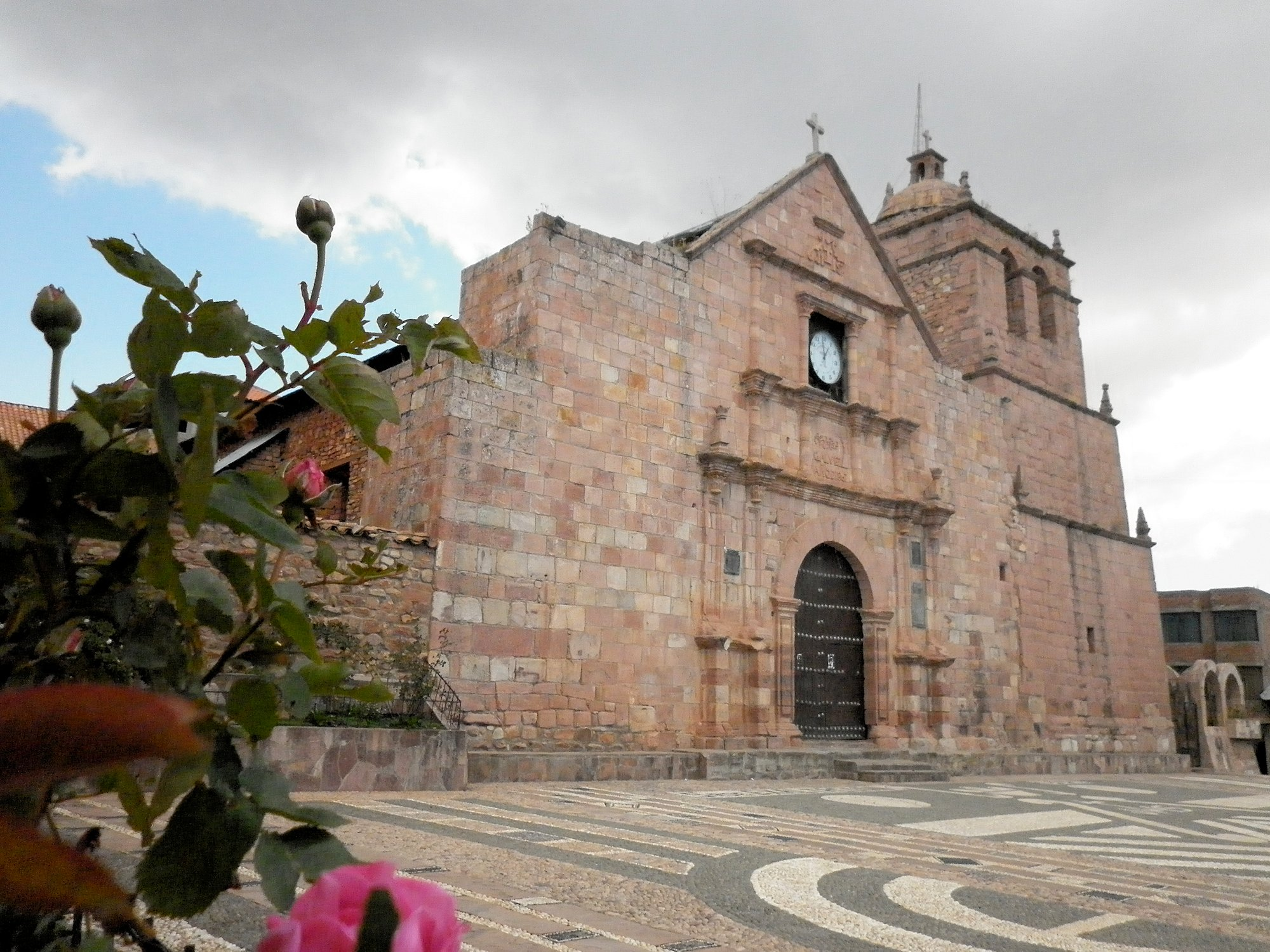
- Church of Moho
- Interactive map of Moho
- Country: Peru
- Region: Puno
- Province: Moho
- Capital: Moho

Government
  - Mayor: Randolfo Mamani Aracayo

Area
  - Total: 495.8 km^{2} (191.4 sq mi)
- Elevation: 3,841 m (12,602 ft)

Population (2005 census)
  - Total: 16,847
  - Density: 33.98/km^{2} (88.01/sq mi)
- Time zone: UTC-5 (PET)
- UBIGEO: 210901

Moho District is one of four districts of the province Moho in Peru.

== Ethnic groups ==
The people in the district are mainly indigenous citizens of Aymara descent. Aymara is the language which the majority of the population (80.47%) learnt to speak in childhood, 18.60% of the residents started speaking using the Spanish language (2007 Peru Census).

== Climate ==
Climate data for Huaraya Moho, elevation 3,836 m (12,585 ft), (1991–2020)
Month	Jan	Feb	Mar	Apr	May	Jun	Jul	Aug	Sep	Oct	Nov	Dec	Year
Mean daily maximum °C (°F)	14.6 (58.3)	14.7 (58.5)	14.6 (58.3)	14.7 (58.5)	14.5 (58.1)	13.8 (56.8)	13.9 (57.0)	14.7 (58.5)	15.7 (60.3)	16.1 (61.0)	16.6 (61.9)	15.6 (60.1)	15.0 (58.9)
Mean daily minimum °C (°F)	5.0 (41.0)	4.9 (40.8)	4.2 (39.6)	2.7 (36.9)	0.0 (32.0)	−1.6 (29.1)	−1.9 (28.6)	−0.9 (30.4)	1.3 (34.3)	2.9 (37.2)	3.7 (38.7)	4.6 (40.3)	2.1 (35.7)
Average precipitation mm (inches)	178.4 (7.02)	147.1 (5.79)	102.5 (4.04)	49.6 (1.95)	13.2 (0.52)	7.2 (0.28)	6.0 (0.24)	11.9 (0.47)	31.5 (1.24)	59.3 (2.33)	61.3 (2.41)	138.1 (5.44)	806.1 (31.73)
Source: National Meteorology and Hydrology Service of Peru

== See also ==
- Mirq'imarka
