= Moho province =

Coordinates: 15.360764°S 69.499844°W

Moho Muhu
- Province
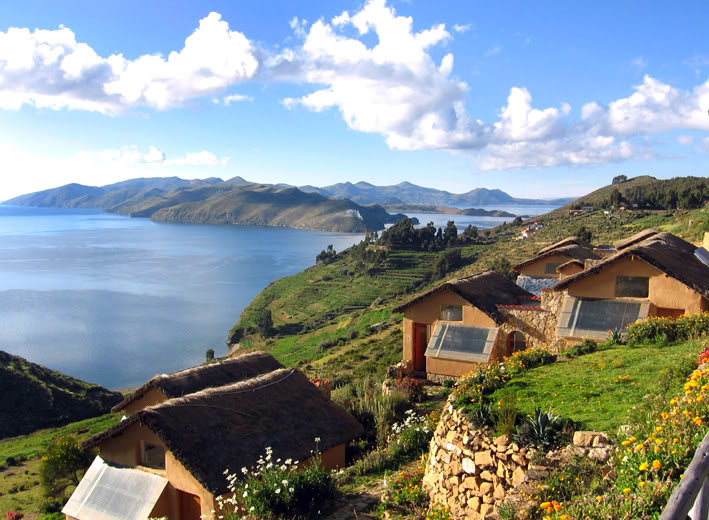
- Suwasi (Suasi) island and Lake Titicaca, Moho Province

- Location of Moho in the Puno Region
- Country: Peru
- Region: Puno
- Capital: Moho

Government
  - Mayor: Randolfo Mamani Aracayo

Area
  - Total: 1,005.25 km^{2} (388.13 sq mi)
- Elevation: 3,841 m (12,602 ft)

Population
  - Total: 28,149
  - Density: 28.002/km^{2} (72.525/sq mi)
- UBIGEO: 2109

Moho is a province of the Puno Region in Peru.

== Political division ==
The province measures 1,005.25 square kilometres (388.13 sq mi) and is divided into four districts:

District	Mayor	Capital	Ubigeo
Conima	Alejandro Apaza Quispe	Conima	210902
Huayrapata	Juan De Dios Cauna Chiara	Huayrapata	210903
Moho	Randolfo Mamani Aracayo	Moho	210901
Tilali	Zenon Alan Cañazaca Blanco	Tilali	210904

== Ethnic groups ==
The people in the province are mainly indigenous citizens of Aymara descent. Aymara is the language which the majority of the population (85.42%) learnt to speak in childhood, 13.70% of the residents started speaking using the Spanish language and 0.55% using Quechua (2007 Peru Census).

== See also ==
- Mirq'imarka
