= Segmentary lineage =

Type of tribal society composed of identifiably divisible segments or subgroups

A segmentary lineage society has equivalent parts ("segments") held together by shared values. A segmentary lineage society is a type of tribal society.

A close family is usually the smallest and closest segment and will generally stand together. That family is also a part of a larger segment of more distant cousins and their families, who will stand with each other when attacked by outsiders. They are then part of larger segments with the same characteristics. If there is a conflict between brothers, it will be settled by all the brothers, and cousins will not take sides. If the conflict is between cousins, brothers on one side will align against brothers on the other side. However, if the conflict is between a member of a tribe and a non-member, the entire tribe, including distant cousins, could mobilise against the outsider and their allies. That tiered mobilisation is traditionally expressed, for example, in the Bedouin saying: "Me and my brothers against my cousins, me and my cousins against the world."

The segmentary state has been used as a theoretical frame of reference for historical theories. For example, by Aidan Southall in "The Illusion of Tribe" and by Burton Stein in India. The latter used the term to explain the structure of a number of Indian polities.

Brian Schwimmer has described a system in which complementary opposition and genealogical principles of unilineal descent are used by residential groups as a basis for political mobilization in the absence of centralized political leadership.

== Examples ==
- The ancient Hebrew nation (the Israelites) is one of the better-known examples, with biblical tradition denoting 12 tribes originating from one common ancestor (Jacob).
- The largest segmentary lineage society today is believed to be the Pashtun people, originally from Afghanistan but now also in Pakistan, with some 50 million members organised into a vast tribal structure.
- Arab tribal officials say that Bani Tamim, an Adnanite tribe, has more than 42 million members, who all trace their lineage back to one man called Tamim.
