= Conima District =

Coordinates: 15.4613°S 69.4373°W

Conima
- District
- Interactive map of Conima
- Country: Peru
- Region: Puno
- Province: Moho
- Founded: May 2, 1854
- Capital: Conima

Government
  - Mayor: Alejandro Apaza Quispe

Area
  - Total: 72.95 km^{2} (28.17 sq mi)
- Elevation: 3,860 m (12,660 ft)

Population (2005 census)
  - Total: 4,177
  - Density: 57.26/km^{2} (148.3/sq mi)
- Time zone: UTC-5 (PET)
- UBIGEO: 210902

Conima District is one of four districts of the province Moho in Peru.

== Ethnic groups ==
The people in the district are mainly indigenous citizens of Aymara descent. Aymara is the language which the majority of the population (92.59%) learnt to speak in childhood, 6.70% of the residents started speaking using the Spanish language (2007 Peru Census).
