= Kenko, Puno =

Archaeological site in Peru

Kenko
- Q'inq'u; Inka Anatawi
- Location: Peru, Puno Region
- Region: Andes

Site notes
- Height: 4,000 m (13,000 ft)

\

Kenko, Qenqo or Q'inq'u (possibly Aymara for "twisted, bent") or also Inka Anatawi, is an archaeological site in Peru. It is located in the Puno Region, Puno Province, Acora District, at an elevation of about 4,000 m (13,000 ft). The site was declared a National Cultural Heritage (Patrimonio Cultural) of Peru by the National Institute of Culture.

== See also ==
Molloko
