= Molloko =

Archaeological site in Peru

Coordinates: 16.008°S 69.772°W

- Location within Peru
- Location: Puno Region, Puno Province
- Region: Andes

Molloko (possibly from Aymara for round, round head and swirl) is an archaeological site in Peru. It is located in the Puno Region, Puno Province, Acora District, about 5 km south of the town of Acora, near the village of Molloco. The site was declared a National Cultural Heritage (Patrimonio Cultural) by the National Institute of Culture.

== See also ==
- Kenko, Puno
