= Mallkuamaya =

Archaeological site in Peru

- Interactive map of Mallkuamaya
- Location: Peru, Puno Region, Puno Province
- Region: Andes

Mallkuamaya (possibly from Aymara mayqu (also often mallku, mallqu) leader, amaya dead body, dead / beloved son / battlement / a thin person / lazy) is an archaeological site in Peru. It is located in the Puno Region, Puno Province, Puno District, about 15 km southwest of Puno. The site was declared a National Cultural Heritage (Patrimonio Cultural) of Peru by the National Institute of Culture.
