= Paucarcolla District =

Coordinates: 15.7462°S 70.0585°W

Paucarcolla
- District
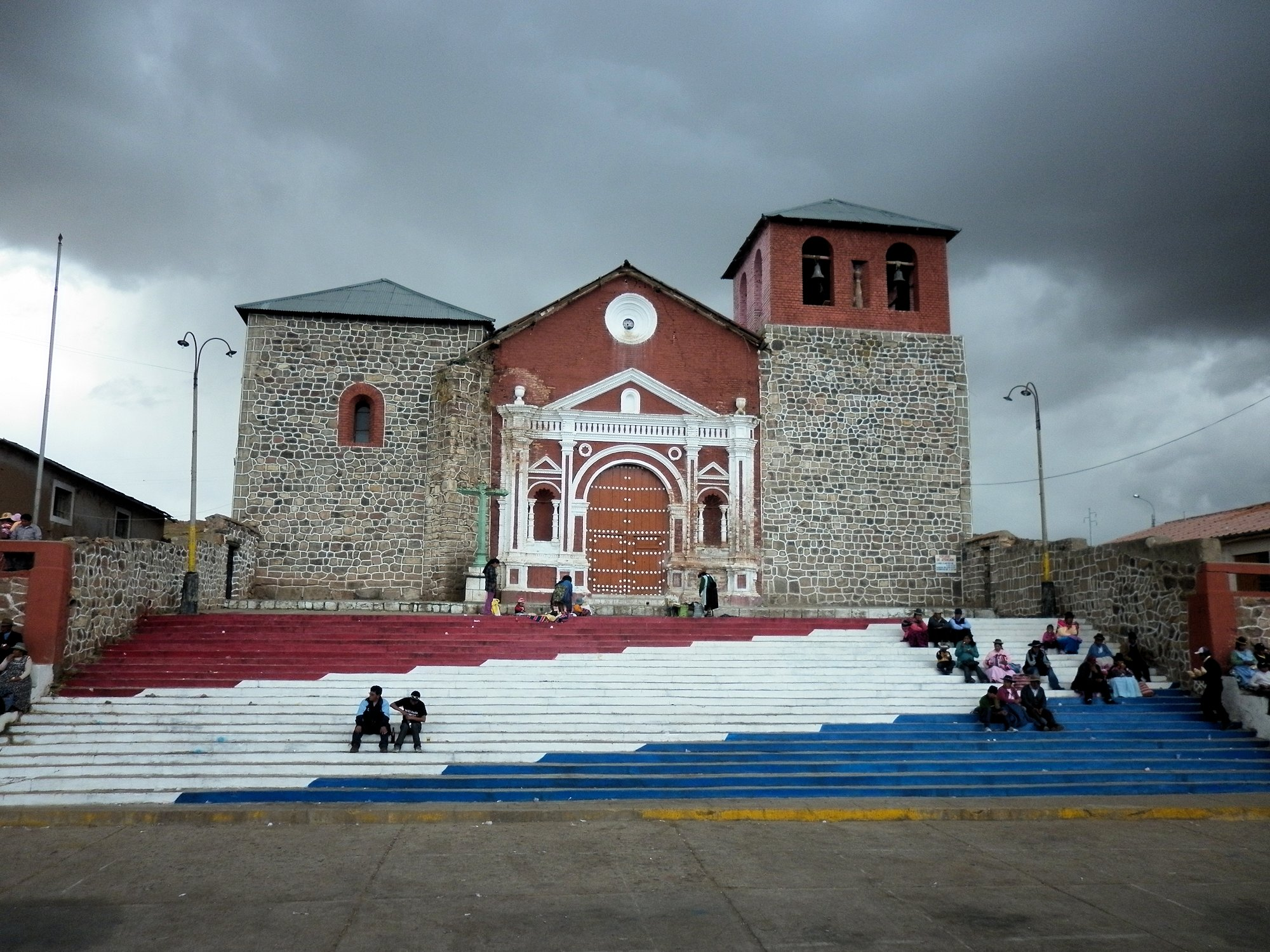
- Church of Paucarcolla
- Interactive map of Paucarcolla
- Country: Peru
- Region: Puno
- Province: Puno
- Capital: Paucarcolla

Government
  - Mayor: Isaac Samuel Llanqui Condori

Area
  - Total: 170.04 km^{2} (65.65 sq mi)
- Elevation: 3,847 m (12,621 ft)

Population (2007 census)
  - Total: 4,864
  - Density: 28.61/km^{2} (74.09/sq mi)
- Time zone: UTC-5 (PET)
- UBIGEO: 210110

Paucarcolla District is one of fifteen districts of the province of Puno in southeastern Peru.

== Ethnic groups ==
The people in the district are mainly indigenous citizens of Quechua descent. Quechua is the language which the majority of the population (77.21%) learnt to speak in childhood, 21.63% of the residents started speaking using the Spanish language (2007 Peru Census).
