= Moho, Peru =

Moho
- Town
- Location within Peru
- Coordinates: 15°21′38.75″S 69°29′59.44″W
- Country: Peru
- Region: Puno
- Province: Moho
- District: Moho
- Time zone: UTC-5 (PET)

Moho (aymara: Muju) is a town in Southern Peru, capital of the province Moho in the region Puno.

== Climate ==
Climate data for Huaraya Moho, elevation 3,836 m (12,585 ft), (1991–2020)
Month	Jan	Feb	Mar	Apr	May	Jun	Jul	Aug	Sep	Oct	Nov	Dec	Year
Mean daily maximum °C (°F)	14.6 (58.3)	14.7 (58.5)	14.6 (58.3)	14.7 (58.5)	14.5 (58.1)	13.8 (56.8)	13.9 (57.0)	14.7 (58.5)	15.7 (60.3)	16.1 (61.0)	16.6 (61.9)	15.6 (60.1)	15.0 (58.9)
Mean daily minimum °C (°F)	5.0 (41.0)	4.9 (40.8)	4.2 (39.6)	2.7 (36.9)	0.0 (32.0)	−1.6 (29.1)	−1.9 (28.6)	−0.9 (30.4)	1.3 (34.3)	2.9 (37.2)	3.7 (38.7)	4.6 (40.3)	2.1 (35.7)
Average precipitation mm (inches)	178.4 (7.02)	147.1 (5.79)	102.5 (4.04)	49.6 (1.95)	13.2 (0.52)	7.2 (0.28)	6.0 (0.24)	11.9 (0.47)	31.5 (1.24)	59.3 (2.33)	61.3 (2.41)	138.1 (5.44)	806.1 (31.73)
Source: National Meteorology and Hydrology Service of Peru
