= Inca Uyo =

Archaeological site in Peru

Coordinates: 15.8922°S 69.8888°W

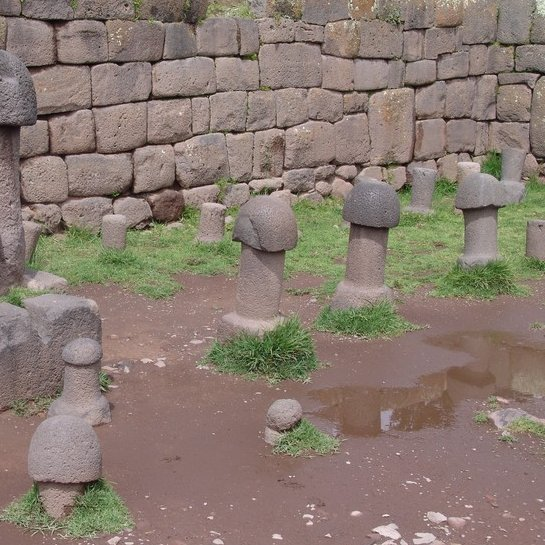

- Location within Peru
- Location: Chucuito, Puno Province, Puno

`Inca Uyo is an archaeological site of cut-stone structures located near the town of Chucuito, Peru. The site is an arrangement of carved stones protruding from the earth within a walled rectangular ruin.

The site was important in pre-Inca times and described by Pedro Cieza de León who was told by the locals that nearby village of Chucuito was the oldest site in the region and continued to be held as a sacred site by the Inca. The site previously consisted of large buildings and was a major center of power.
