= Ayaviri, Melgar =

Ayaviri Ayawiri
- Village
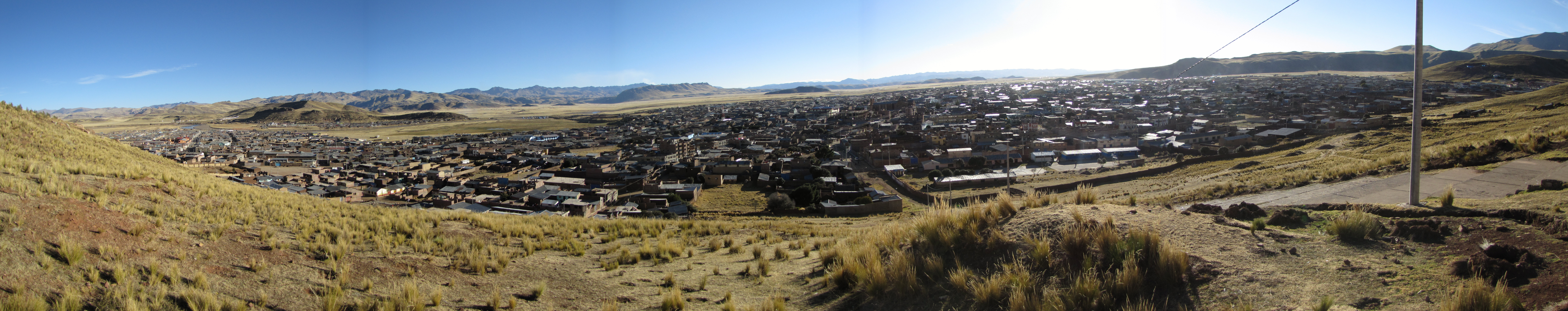
- Ayaviri panorama

- Location within Peru
- Coordinates: 14°52′54.56″S 70°35′24.22″W
- Country: Peru
- Region: Puno
- Province: Melgar
- District: Ayaviri

Government
  - Mayor: Luciano Huahuasoncco Hancco
- Elevation: 3,907 m (12,818 ft)

Population
  - Estimate (2015): 20,152
- Time zone: UTC-5 (PET)
- Website: http://www.munimelgar.gob.pe/

Ayaviri or Ayawiri (Aymara) is a town in Southern Peru, capital of the province Melgar in the region Puno. According to the 2007 Peruvian census, Ayaviri has a population of 22,667 people. Local festivities of note include the Festividad de Calendaria on January 24 and the Aniversario de la Provincia on October 25.

== Meaning of the name ==
The origin of the word “ayaviri” is wrapped in uncertainty. What meaning can be inferred is through the etymological study of the words, suffixes and prefixes of the languages prevalent in the region throughout its history. These languages include principally Urikuilla, Pukina and Aymara. Although Quechua is the current colloquial language of the area and was originally attributed to be the language of the word's origin, its prevalence among the natives is of a later era, implying a less influential place in the formation of the word's meaning.

=== Urikuilla ===
In Urikuilla, the word ayawiri means “the place or the town where reeds grow.” Although presently the word does not seem to match the geographical reality, the region was actually abundant in such reeds not too long ago.

=== Pukin ===
In Pukin, the compound word ayaviri means “the farm/plantation of the children” or “the place for the farms/plantations of the children.” Another compound word, hayaviri or jayaviri, means “the place of cultivation for young men/sons.” This is in concordance with an old tradition from the region consisting of a yearly distribution of agricultural land. The right to cultivate these lands is only inherited by the sons of the families belonging to these communities.

=== Aymara ===
The meanings gathered from Aymara are especially rich and various. From the compound word ayawiri can mean “to spin,” “the spinners” or “the place where the spinners live.” This name seems linked to the local spinning mills that received the wool from the livestock of the region to manufacture yarn and fabrics. These mills were destroyed in 1781 during the rebellion of Tupac Amaru II.

Another word aywiri means “men that go great together” or “men marching close together.” This means by extension “army with many soldiers,” “army with many militants” or “army with many militia.” The word hayaviri or jayaviri, according to the voices from which it derives can mean “a distant place” and by extension “border town,” or “the people who are far away” and “the people who live on the borders of a nation.” It can also have a more military denotation, such as “men marching ahead” and therefore “vanguard,” “champion, “line of battle” and other derivations. Another similar word, hayahiwiri or jayahiwiri, means “General Commander of the Aymaran armies,” “inmortal” or “champion.”

The compound word hayahawiri denotes “the river that comes from far away,” very possibly referring to the river that runs south of the town.

=== Quechua ===
Although it appears that the Quechua language had little to do with the name's origin due to its later arrival to the region, it is still worthwhile to consider its influence on the current understanding of the name, being that it has now been the colloquial language of the town for several centuries and probably serves as a more immediate reference among the locals to its understand its meaning.

It has been attributed to a certain Fr. Jorge A. Lira (1952) the translation of the word ayaviri to “soldier,” “military” or “minuteman,” which by extension can mean "meeting place of many armies" or "Captain-General." Another word, ayuiri or awiri, can also mean "soldier," but with the additional meanings of "added," "joined," or "reunited."

The word aya in Quechua means "dead body," "dead," or "corpse." From this a few words can be formed which come to bear some resemblance to ayaviri. For example, when the word huayra or wayra, which means "wind," "air," or "odor," is added as a suffix, the compound formed comes to mean "wind of the dead," "wind with a odor of the dead," or "bad wind which originates from the cemeteries. Likewise, when the word huera or wera, which means "tallow," "fat" or "grease" is made the suffix, the word denotes the tallow, fat or grease of a dead body. A connection might exist between these words and the many tombs recorded to have been present around the town by Pedro Cieza de León.

Another similar compound word can be formed by the use of the word haya or jaya, which means "bitter" or "pungent." Thus the word hayahuayra or jayawayra come to mean "bitter wind" or "pungent wind."

== History ==
=== Pre-incan people ===
According to Pedro Cieza de León, the first people of Ayaviri were descendants of their neighbors the tribe of Canas. He describes them as being “proud, cautious, and melancholy, their clothing was usually of a somber colour, and their music was plaintive and sad.” In comparison with the tribe of Canches, with whom they often warred, he further describes those of the tribe of Canas as “of a darker complexion” as well as “stouter and better made.”

=== Incan conquest ===
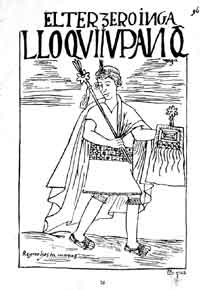
Inca Lloque Yupanqui.

The accounts left by Pedro Cieza de León and “The Inca” Garcilaso de la Vega are the best written testimony available concerning the Incan conquest of Ayaviri. The conquest occurred under Inca Lloque Yupanqui, though it appears that many battles had passed before the inhabitants of Ayaviri submitted themselves to the rule of the Inca. Garcilaso de la Vega offers more details of these battles. He writes that the people of Ayaviri stubbornly went to battle, unwilling to hear the counsel or the promises offered and desiring to die fighting for their freedom. Both sides fought valiantly with great losses all around. However, the Inca called for more troops of great number, hoping to set an example with the victory. Once the reinforcements had arrived, the people of Ayaviri were forced to surrender. Cieza de León writes that “they suffered so severely that they submitted to his service, to save themselves from entire destruction.”

The two historians appear to differ in their portrayal of Lloque Yupanqui’s disposition. Cieza de León describes some of the Incas as “vindictive” and, similar to his treatment of previous villages he conquered, he killed many “in such sort that few or none were left alive” even after their surrender. Garcilaso de la Vega, on the other hand, records that after a “grave reprehension” they were pardoned and it was ordered that they be treated well.

Pedro goes on to record a few of the acts of the Lloque Yupanqui in the area after the conquest. He ordered the construction of many buildings, including a palace and a temple of the sun. He also called in groups of indigenous families called mitimae to form a town around these edifices, to tend to the land and to be the heirs of the dead natives. Thus Ayaviri was fully incorporated into Tahuantinsuyo, its population under the control and distribution of the Inca and receiving the religion and economic structure.

=== During the Viceroyalty of New Spain ===
Ayaviri was conquered by the Spanish after having done so with Cuzco. It was unavoidable that Diego de Almagro, in order to make his expedition southwards in 1535, would pass through Ayaviri. The territory was "entrusted" to Francisco Villacastín, the first encomendero of Ayaviri, in 1543. But shortly after, around 1545, Pedro Cieza de León records that there was already a new encomendero by the name of Juan de Pancorbo.

As was common in these repartimientos or distributions, these territories also served to divide doctrinas or curatos of ecclesial jurisdiction. In the case of the doctrine of Ayaviri, established 1565, it was dependent upon the Lampa Province, and this upon the Bishopric of Cuzco.

The region in general was noted by contemporaries at the time to be especially abundant in livestock, a characteristic that even today is boasted of the province (It is known as the capital ganadera del Perú, "livestock capital of Peru.") and that the town of Ayaviri itself has influenced this both in the past and presently. Friar Reginaldo de Lizárraga describes Ayaviri as "extremely windy and cold, a town that is big and rich in livestock of the earth, as are the rest in this province of Ayaviri." These and other natural resources were developed under the structures of the encomienda and the estancia, which were the foundation of the economy of Ayaviri.

=== Involvement in pre-independence revolutions ===
There are several testimonies of Ayaviri's convention and participation in the uprisings that furnished the later explicit independence movement from Spain. In the first place, hundreds of "indigenous" from various towns, including Ayaviri, are recorded to have participated the rebellion of 1771. This rebellion is considered a prelude to the more famous rebellion of Tupac Amaru II, during which it appears that he and his army were well received in Ayaviri on each of his visits, including his first on December 6, 1780, which led to the significant destruction of church and civil property in its various forms. Moreover, Ayaviri is recorded to have had a significant place in the second phase of this rebellion (after Tupac Amaru II) by responding enthusiastically to its promotion. Finally, Ayaviri served as the barracks for Angulo and Mateo Pumacahua on March 10, 1815, the day before the battle of Umachiri.

While it seems certain that a steady and significant portion of the inhabitants of Ayaviri responded in support of the different uprisings, other sources offer a different but coinciding reality. Carlos Contreras and Marcos Cueto contend that Pumacahua's revolution ultimately failed because it did not attract neither criollos nor indigenous supporters, and that it was the very people of Ayaviri that captured him and gave him up for execution. What can probably be concluded from these apparently opposing perspectives is that Ayaviri, as is common among communities of people, was composed of people with differing opinions towards these uprisings in their different occurrences, some being in favor and others being opposed.

== Religion ==
=== Catholic faith ===
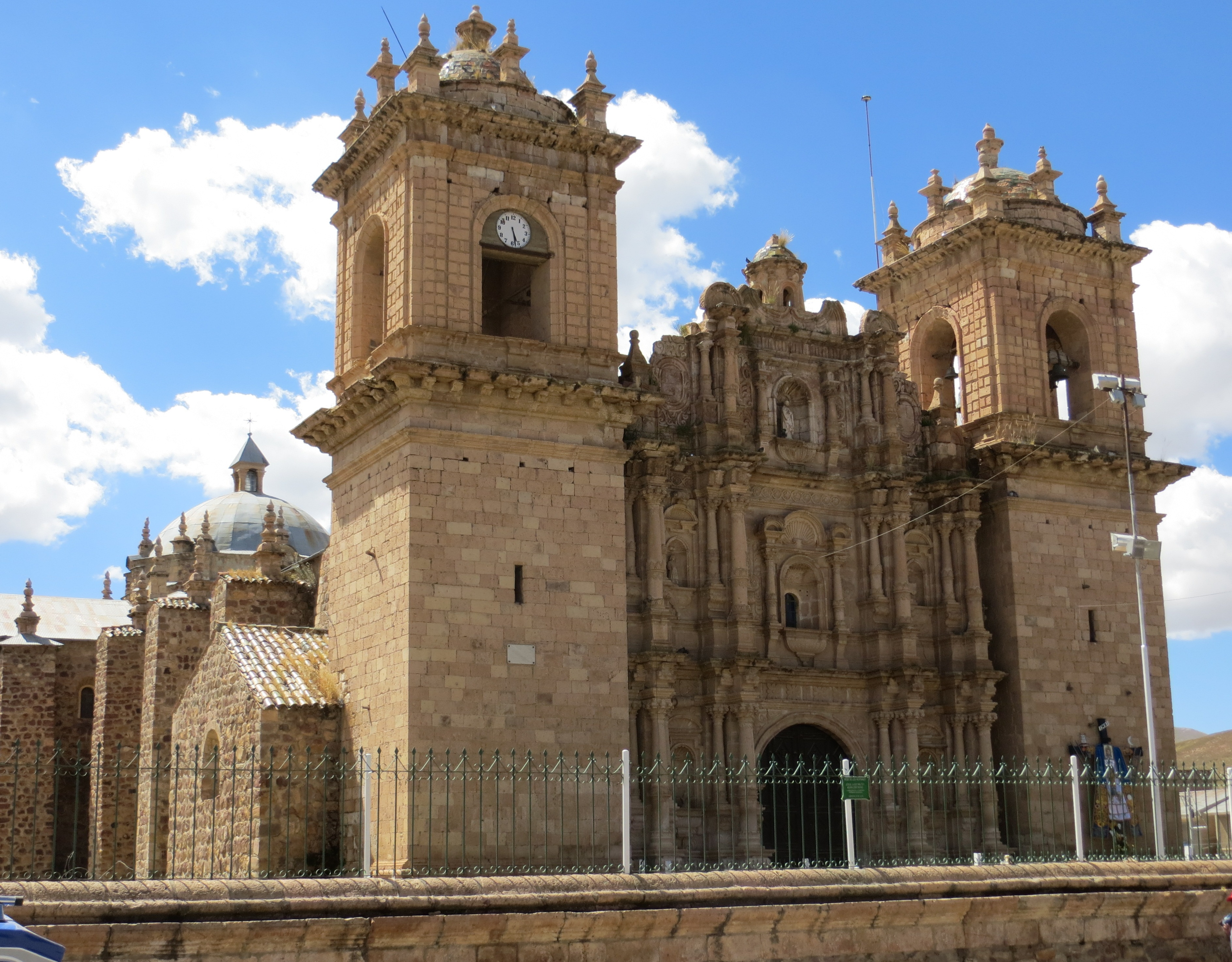
The Cathedral of Saint Francis of Assisi.

The religious practice and expression in Ayaviri continues to be predominantly Catholic since the arrival of the Spanish.

The Cathedral of Saint Francis of Assisi, located in the Plaza de Armas, is the oldest structure in Ayaviri and a symbol of the enduring Catholic faith of the people. It was built as it stands today towards the end of the 17th century, though various reconstructions and repairs later followed. The Spanish architect, Diego Angulo Íñiguez, comments that it is "possibly the best work produced, outside the walls of Cuzco, by the baroque of the golden age in which the bishop Mollinedo y Angulo exercised their artistic patronage." Manifesting an exterior and interior decoration that is exemplary of the Cuzco school of art and architecture, the cathedral is considered an exceptional representation of Andean Baroque.

The cathedral, along with the plaza, has historically been the focal point of celebrations and social gatherings, many of which religious in nature. Upon the foundation of the Territorial Prelature of Ayaviri on July 30, 1958, the cathedral was made the "Parochial Church of the Prelature," making it not only a center for the prelature as well as for the town in which it resides.

The popular piety of the people of Ayaviri takes form in a number of colorful religious expressions. Among the most noteworthy are the following:

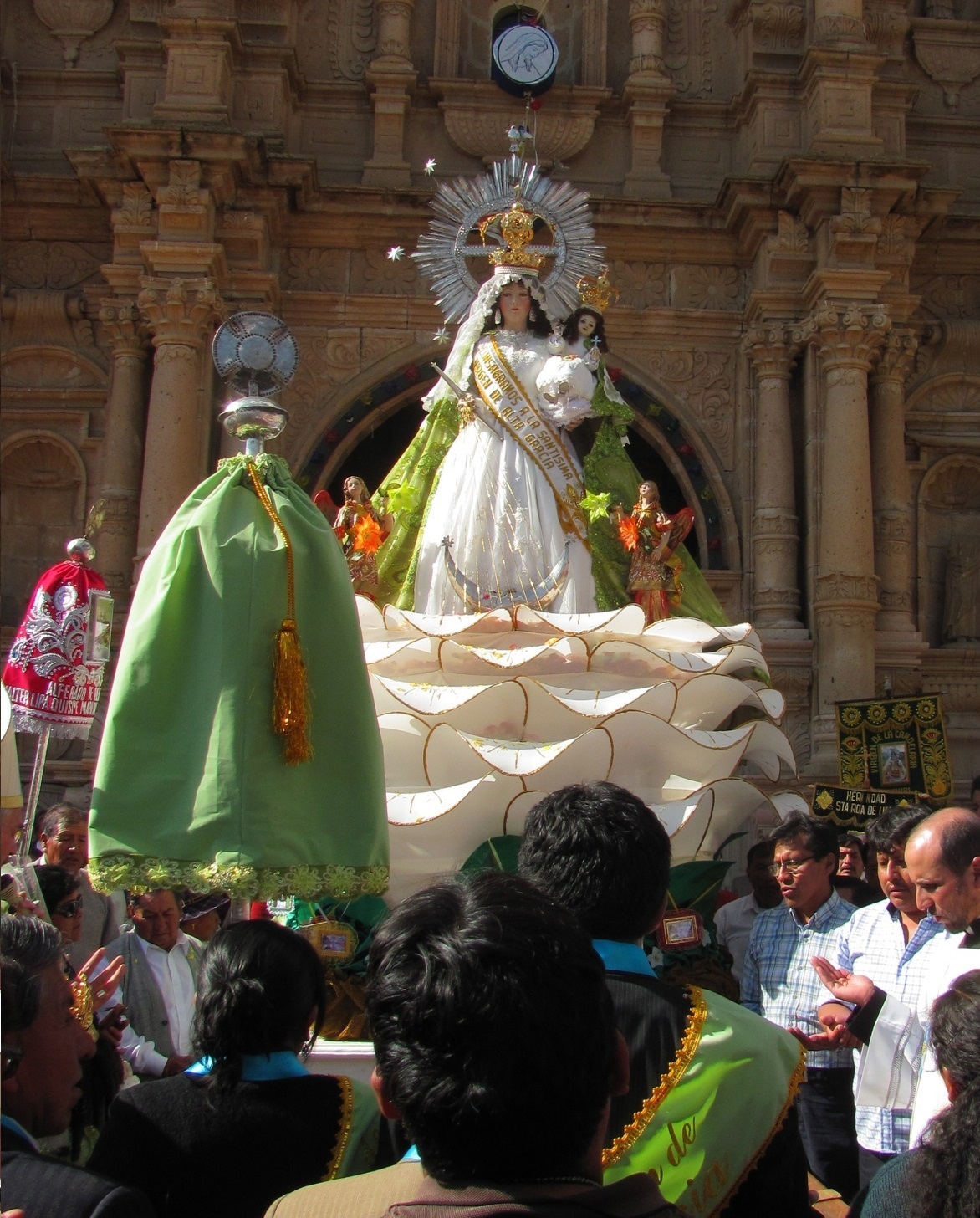
Procession in honor of Our Lady of High Grace.

Date	Celebration	Details
3 May	Festival of the Cross of Kolqueparque	Begins with a candlelight vigil in the evening and is followed by Masses and processions the following days. The whole region celebrates this festival throughout the month, although each town on differing days.
17 July	Our Lady Queen of Peace	
6 August	Virgin of Copacabana	The Mass and the procession is accompanied by the blessing of automobiles.
8 August	St. Rose of Lima	Patroness of Peru.
7-15 September	Our Lady of High Grace	Celebrated as an octave with Masses and processions, Our Lady of High Grace is undoubtedly the most beloved devotion of the people of Ayaviri.
4 October	St. Francis of Assisi	Due to the presence of the Franciscans during the early evangelization and the enduring name of the cathedral after the saint, St. Francis maintains a special place in the devotion of the locals.
28 October	Lord of Miracles	An extremely popular devotion throughout the entire country of Peru.

== Climate ==
Climate data for Ayaviri, elevation 3,941 m (12,930 ft), (1991–2020)
Month	Jan	Feb	Mar	Apr	May	Jun	Jul	Aug	Sep	Oct	Nov	Dec	Year
Mean daily maximum °C (°F)	16.3 (61.3)	16.3 (61.3)	16.4 (61.5)	16.8 (62.2)	17.0 (62.6)	16.3 (61.3)	16.3 (61.3)	17.4 (63.3)	18.6 (65.5)	18.7 (65.7)	19.0 (66.2)	17.8 (64.0)	17.2 (63.0)
Mean daily minimum °C (°F)	3.8 (38.8)	3.8 (38.8)	3.1 (37.6)	0.9 (33.6)	−3.5 (25.7)	−6.3 (20.7)	−6.4 (20.5)	−4.6 (23.7)	−1.0 (30.2)	1.0 (33.8)	2.0 (35.6)	3.2 (37.8)	−0.3 (31.4)
Average precipitation mm (inches)	135.5 (5.33)	123.5 (4.86)	102.3 (4.03)	40.1 (1.58)	7.2 (0.28)	3.3 (0.13)	2.7 (0.11)	6.9 (0.27)	13.6 (0.54)	45.8 (1.80)	60.1 (2.37)	89.8 (3.54)	630.8 (24.84)
Source: National Meteorology and Hydrology Service of Peru
