= Chucuito =

Ancient town in Peru, facing the Titicaca Lake, near Puno

Coordinates: 15°53′38″S 69°53′20″W

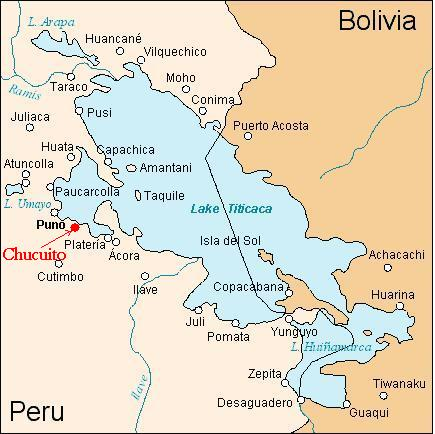

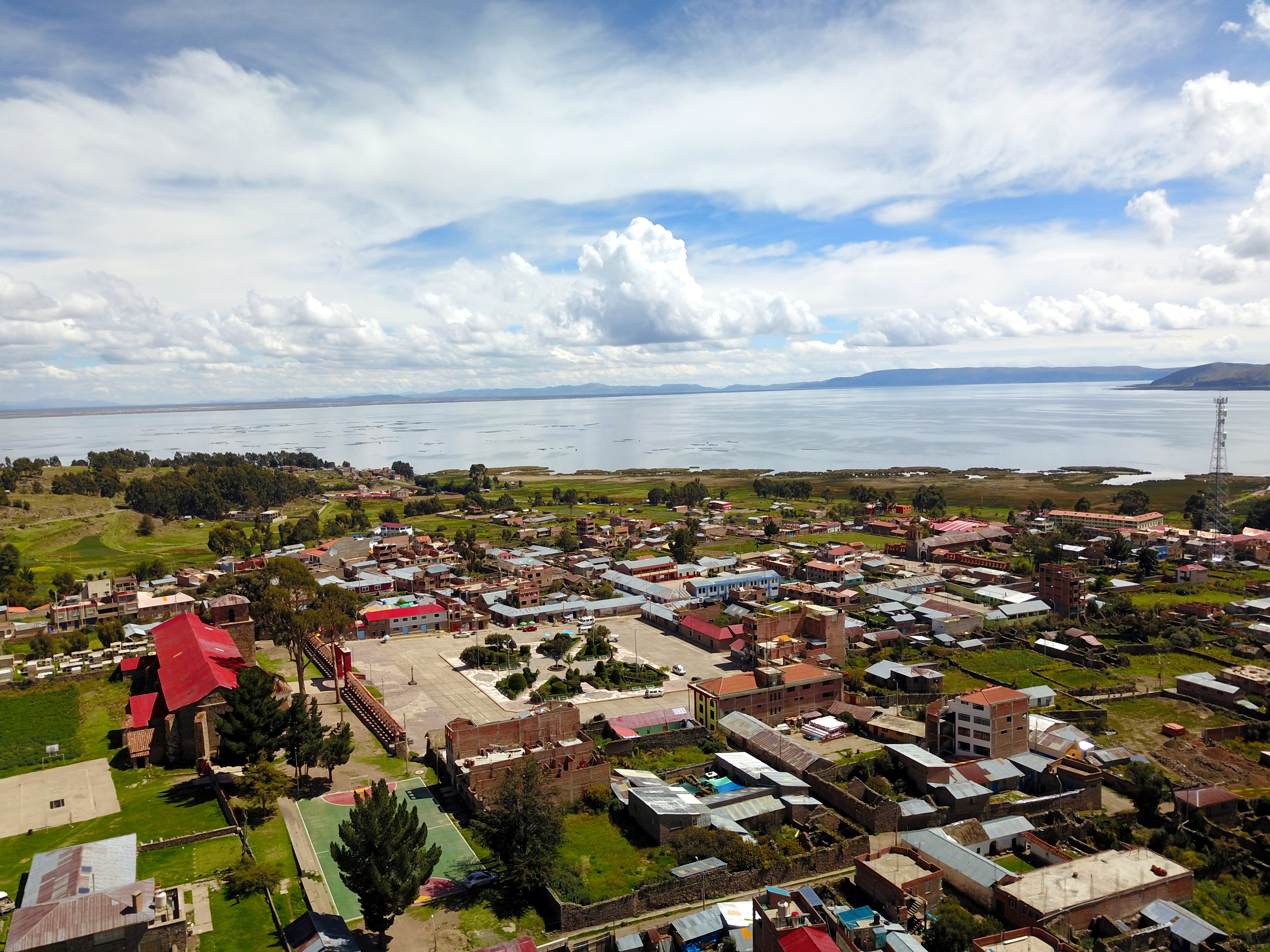
Aerial view of Chucuito and Lake Titicaca.

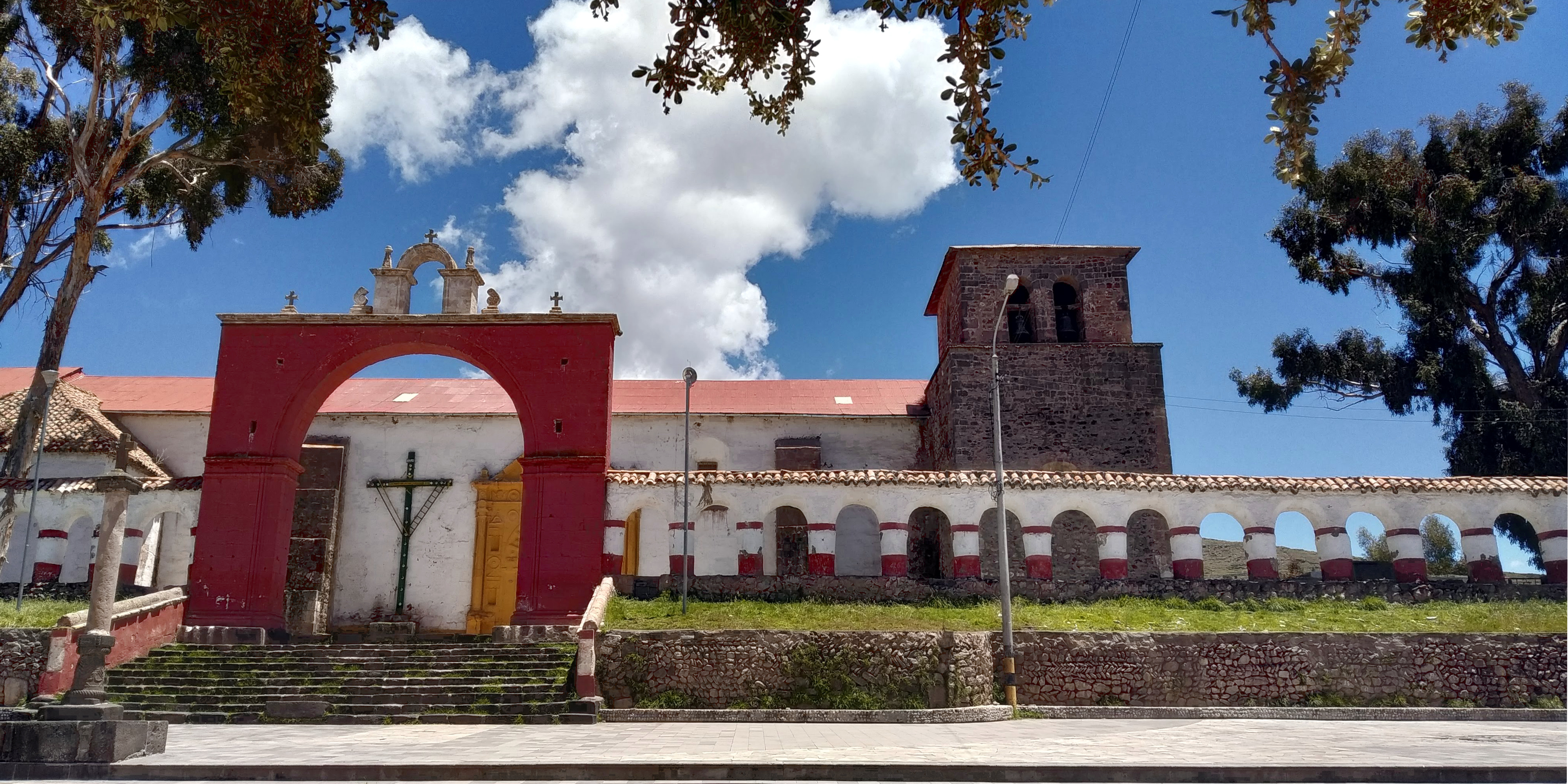
Church of Our Lady of the Assumption.

Chucuito is a village in the Chucuito District, Puno Province, Peru. It is 18 kilometres (11 mi) from the city of Puno. It sits at 3,875 metres (12,713 ft) above sea level. The population is 7,913.

The town was important in pre-Inca times and described by Pedro De Cieza De Leon, who was told by the locals that Chucuito was the oldest site in the region and continued to be held as a sacred site by the Inca. The town previously consisted of large buildings and was a major center of power.

== Gallery ==
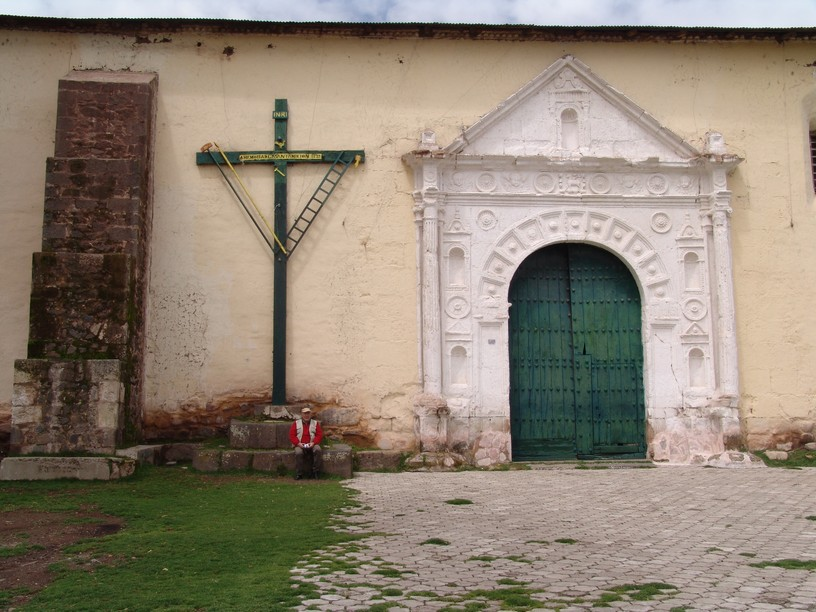
The church in Chucuito

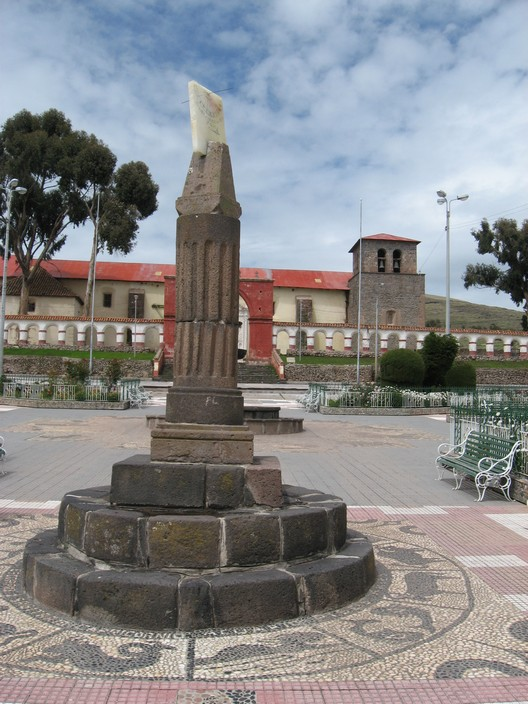
In front of the Church of the Assumption in Chucuito

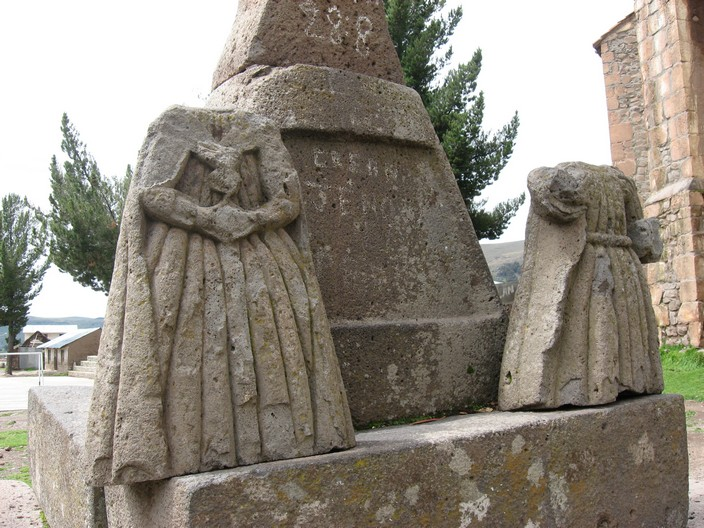
Beheaded colonial sculptures

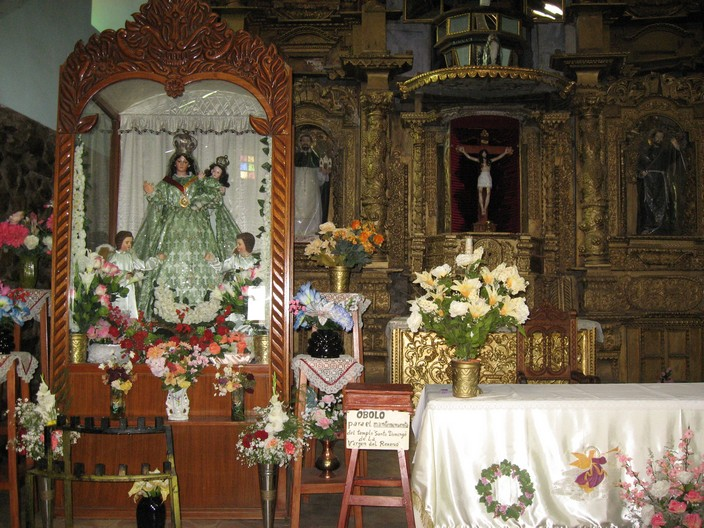
Church in Chucuito

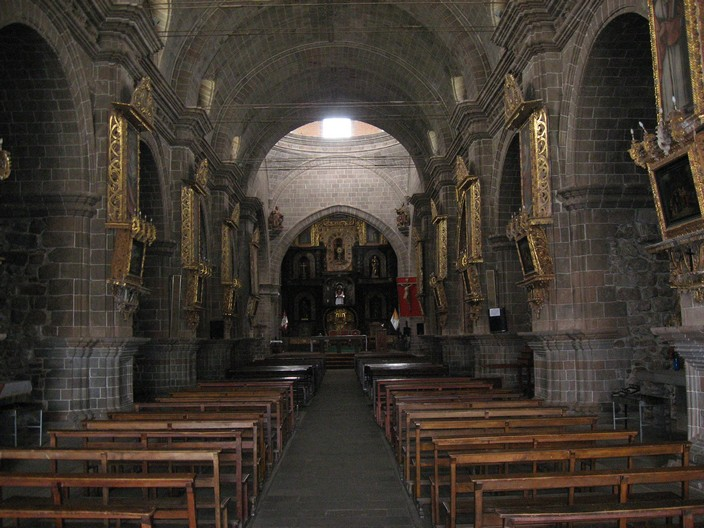
The interior of the church in Chucuito
