= Murato language =

Extinct language of Bolivia

Murato
- Chholo
- Native to: Bolivia
- Region: near Lake Poopó
- Ethnicity: Uru-Murato of Lake Poopó
- Extinct: 17th century 1? (2012)
- Language family: Uru–Chipaya?: Murato

Language codes
- ISO 639-3: None (mis)
- Glottolog: chho1235
- Murato

Murato (Chholo) is the language of the Uros of Lake Poopó in Bolivia. The Murato have shifted to Aymara, but preserve some vocabulary of their original language; a number of rememberers of the language were found, and some data was collected from them.

== Geographical distribution ==
The Uru-Murato live in three villages on the eastern shores of Lake Poopó, Llapallapani, located near Santiago de Huari, Villañeque, near Challapata, and Puñaca, near the city of Poopó.

== History ==
The Uru-Murato speak either Aymara, Quechua or Spanish, with a tendency to replace Aymara with Quechua. Three linguistic studies on the language exist; one by Barragán lists a total of 21 words and numerals from 1 to 10, another by Alavi Mamami (2008) presented at the XVIII Reunión Anual de Etnología, including 20 words and their equivalents in the Uru language of Irohito, and the numerals from 1 to 10 again, and a third recording an untranslated monlogue in the language from Daniel Mauricio Choque, a former leader of the Uru-Murato, though he claimed he did not know much of it. All three studies were conducted in different locations.

== Name ==
Choque referred to the language he recorded as chholo, though he also called it puquina, similarly to the Uru language of Irohito and the related Chipaya.

== Classification ==
Very few of the words in Chholo correspond with those in Uru-Chipaya. The following words are derived from Uru-Chipaya:

Uru-Chipaya vocabulary in Chholo
gloss	Chholo
designation	xax chhuni qot chhuni
bird	wiskala
birds	visklanaka
young	thowa

A number of Chholo words are also derived from Aymara:

Aymara vocabulary in Chholo
gloss	Chholo
brother	jila
sister	kullaka
(too) much	anchaki
well	wale-

It is speculated that some of the non-Uru-Chipaya words were fabricated, though they could have also been inherited.

== Morphology ==
The following suffixes can be identified in Chholo, though without any indication of their grammatical meaning:

Chholo suffixes
Chholo
-kcha- / -qcha
-ksha- / -qsha
-wa
