= Toribia Álvaro =

Bolivian politician (born 1966)

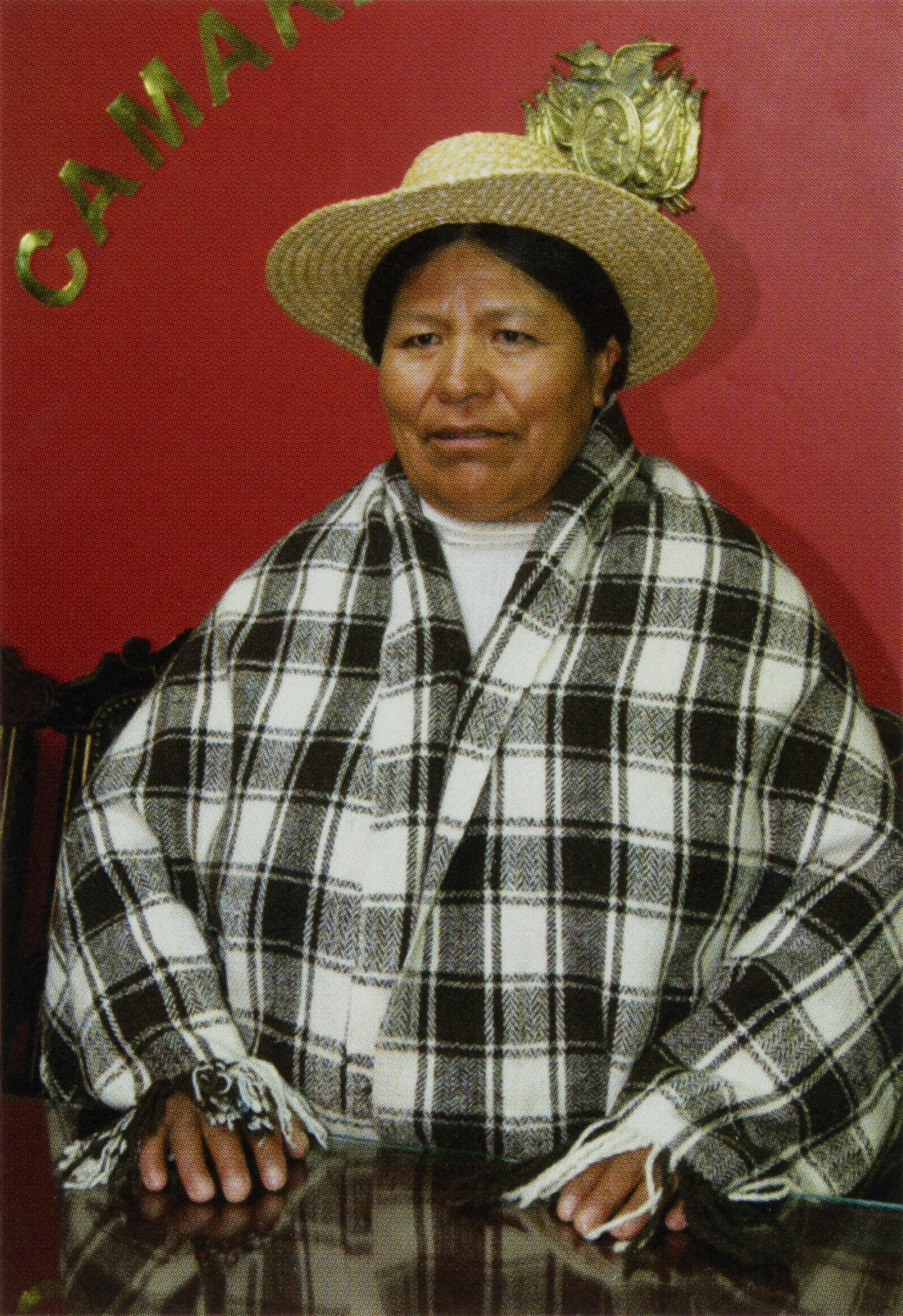
- Portrait of Álvaro, c. 2014

Member of the Chamber of Deputies from Oruro's special constituency
- Substitute
- In office 25 January 2010 – 18 January 2015
- Deputy: Benigno Quispe
- Preceded by: Seat established
- Succeeded by: Inés López
- Constituency: Indigenous

Personal details
- Born: Toribia Álvaro Moya; 16 April 1966 (age 60) Vilañeque, Oruro, Bolivia
- Party: Movement Toward Socialism
- Occupation: Indigenous leader; politician

Toribia Álvaro Moya (Note: In this Spanish name, the first or paternal surname is Álvaro and the second or maternal family name is Moya.) (born 16 April 1966) is a Bolivian Indigenous leader and politician who represented Oruro's special Indigenous constituency as a substitute in the Chamber of Deputies from 2010 to 2015.

Raised in Vilañeque among the Uru of Lake Poopó, Álvaro received limited formal education and worked as a sheep farmer. Beginning in 2004, she held traditional leadership positions in accordance with Uru usos y costumbres. She served as community mayor of Vilañeque and as a member of its school board, and was later mama t'alla of the Uru Native Nation.

In 2009, the Uru people gained a reserved seat in the Chamber of Deputies. For the election, the Uru of Lake Poopó agreed to support Benigno Quispe, an Uru Chipaya, with one of their own as his substitute. To satisfy gender parity law, the candidate had to be a woman, so Álvaro agreed to run. Their ticket won the seat, and she served a single term in the legislature.

== Early life and career ==
=== Background and early life ===
Toribia Álvaro was born on 16 April 1966 in Vilañeque, a hamlet of Challapata Municipality in the Eduardo Abaroa Province of Oruro Department. (Note: Part of Poopó Municipality, Poopó Province, prior to 2001.) The settlement is one of three inhabited by the Uru of Lake Poopó, an Indigenous people native to the lakeshore. Her parents were José Álvaro Mauricio and Ángela Moya Choque. Toribia's father and his family were among the first to settle Vilañeque. The land was property of an Aymara family, who employed them as shepherds and, in gratitude, ceded it for the Uru to live on.

In her youth, Álvaro spoke only Quechua, the language adopted by her people after the loss of their native Chholo. She was educated in a small adobe schoolhouse, where she struggled with Spanish-only instruction. Even as an adult, Álvaro said that she spoke "just a little" Spanish. She attended up to the second grade but dropped out to support her mother following her father's death. To earn money, she performed housework and helped graze sheep for some neighbors.

=== Indigenous leadership ===
Álvaro married at age 32 and, alongside her husband, began assuming roles of traditional authority among the Uru from 2004. In Vilañeque, she served as community mayor, its principal customary leader in accordance with usos y costumbres. Later, she sat on the school board, which oversaw the academic achievement of Uru youth and the promotion of Uru cultural heritage. During her husband's term as mallku jilarata of the Uru Native Nation, she accompanied him to general meetings as mama t'alla of the organization.

== Chamber of Deputies ==
=== Election ===
Beginning with the 2009 election, Bolivia's Indigenous minorities were allocated reserved seats in the Chamber of Deputies, determined by their presence in each department. In Oruro, suffrage was reserved for the Uru peoples: the Uru Chipaya and Uru Murato. (Note: The Uru of Lake Poopó are recognized by the state as Uru Murato.) Being the more populous of the two, the Chipaya imposed their claim to the seat. In turn, the Uru of the Lake settled for the substitute position. Initially, they nominated a man, but the candidate had to be a woman to satisfy gender parity. "None of the women were willing; no one wanted to do it. I said to myself, 'What could happen?' and decided to go for it", Álvaro recalled. The resulting ticket paired Benigno Quispe of the Chipaya with Álvaro representing the Uru of Lake Poopó. They ran on the Movement Toward Socialism (MAS) list, a party Álvaro had been a member of since 2000, and won by a wide margin.

=== Tenure ===
Álvaro was sworn in alongside other substitutes on 25 January 2010. Regarding her time in parliament, she stated, "I [didn't] know anything, and the pressure [was] immense". But, she added, "nobody arrives knowing everything". During her term, Álvaro focused on initiatives for the benefit of the Uru, including a project to install solar panels in the settlements of Llapallapani, Phuñaka Tinta María, and Vilañeque.

=== Commission assignments ===
- Indigenous Native Peasant Nations and Peoples, Cultures, and Interculturality Commission
  - Indigenous Native Peasant Nations and Peoples Committee (Secretary: 2010–2011; 2011–2012)
  - Cultures, Interculturality, and Cultural Heritage Committee (Secretary: 2014–2015)
- Territorial Organization of the State and Autonomies Commission
  - Indigenous Native Peasant Autonomies Committee (2012–2013)
- Plural Justice, Prosecutor's Office, and Legal Defense of the State Commission
  - Indigenous Native Peasant Jurisdiction Committee (2013–2014)

== Electoral history ==
Electoral history of Toribia Álvaro
| Year | Office | | Party | Votes | | | Result | Ref. |
| Year | Office | | Party | Total | % | P. | Result | Ref. |
|---|---|---|---|---|---|---|---|---|
| 2009 | Deputies | S | Movement Toward Socialism | 437 | 74.83 | 1st | Won | |
Source: Plurinational Electoral Organ | Electoral Atlas

Chamber of Deputies of Bolivia
| Seat established | Substitute Member of the Chamber of Deputies from Oruro's special constituency 2010–2015 | Succeeded by Inés López |
