= Khapia =

Archaeological site in Peru

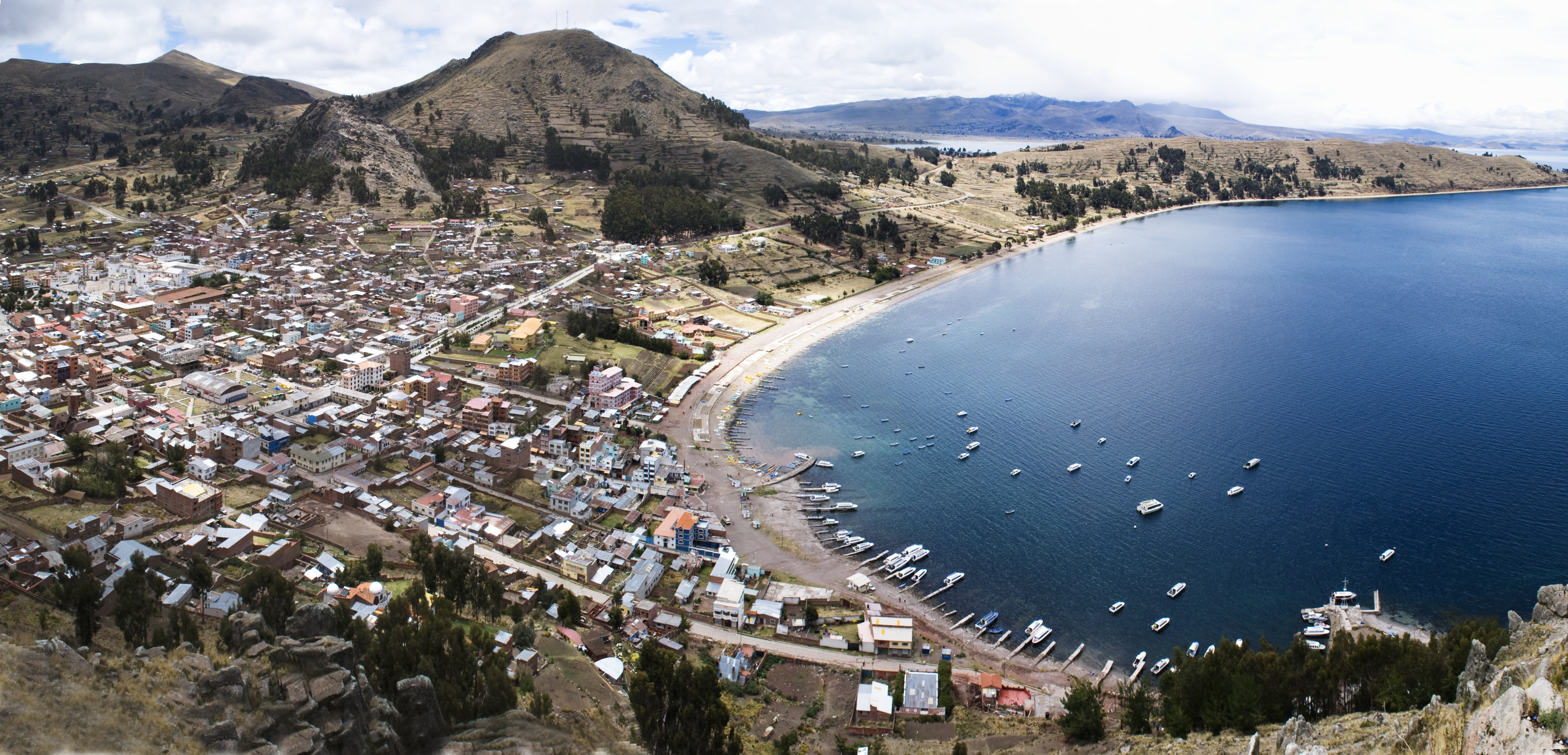
- View of Copacabana with Khapia (center-right) and Asiru Phat'jata (on the right) in the background

Highest point
- Elevation: 4,809 m (15,778 ft)
- Coordinates: 16°19′52.3″S 69°08′32.2″W

Geography
- Location within Peru
- Location: Peru, Puno Region

Khapia (possibly from in the Aymara spelling Qhapiya, or Qapiya in Uru language, Hispanicized spellings Capía, Ccapia, Ccapía, Khapia, Khapía, K'apía) is a mountain in Peru, possibly an extinct volcano, situated at a height of about 4,809 metres (15,778 ft). It is located in the Puno Region, Chucuito Province, in the districts Pomata and Zepita, and in the Yunguyo Province, in the districts Cuturapi, Copani and Yunguyo. The mountain lies near Lake Titicaca at the road which connects Yunguyo and Puno, south of the hill Asiru Phat'jata.

In 2011 Khapia with its prehispanic archaeological site was declared a National Cultural Heritage (Patrimonio Cultural) of Peru by resolution No. 589-2011-VMPCIC-MC of May 13, 2011, of the Vice Minister of the Ministry of Culture and a "Landscape Reserve" (Zona de Reserva Paisajística in Spanish) by Decrete Supreme No. 008-2011-MINAM.

By the local people the mountain is venerated as an Apu.

== Gallery ==
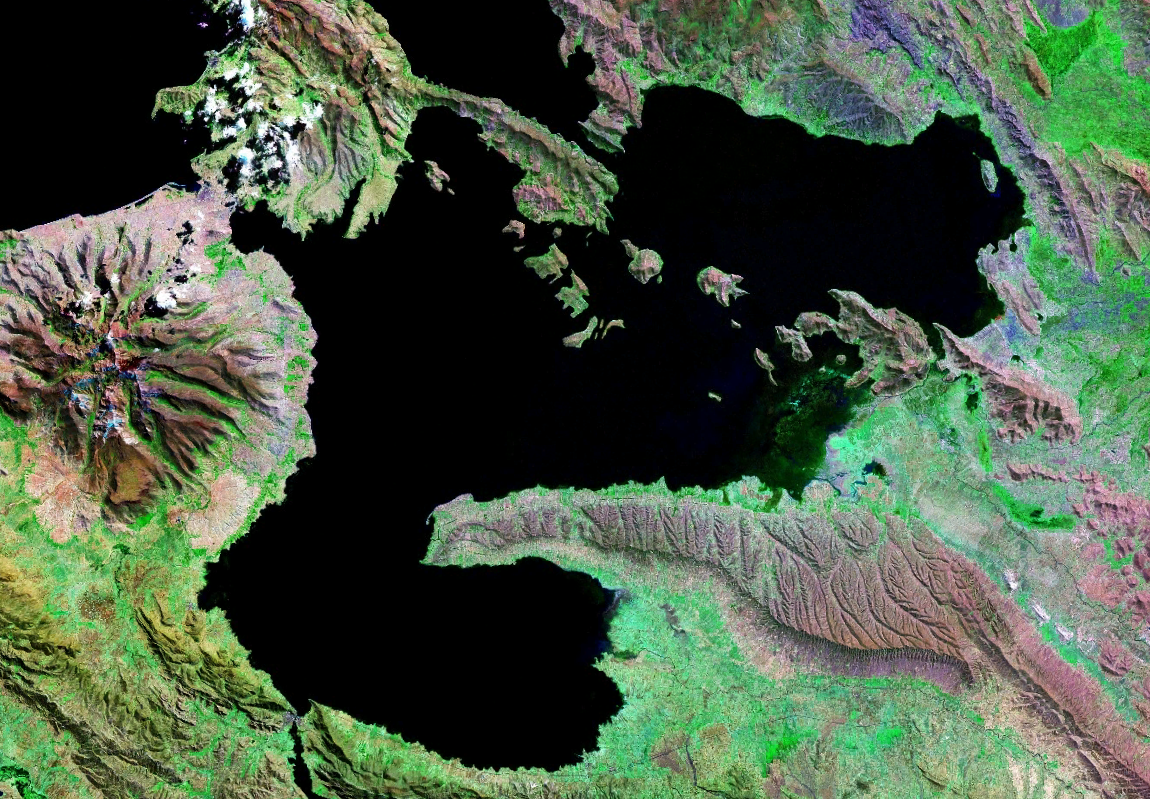
Satellite view of Wiñaymarka Lake, the southern sub-basin of Lake Titicaca, and the mountain Khapia (on the left)
