= Toribia =

Toribia is a feminine given name. Notable people with the name include:

- Toribia Álvaro, Bolivian politician
- Toribia Lero, Bolivian politician

== See also ==
- Maria Torribia, Spanish saint
