= Asiru Phat'jata =

Archaeological site in Peru

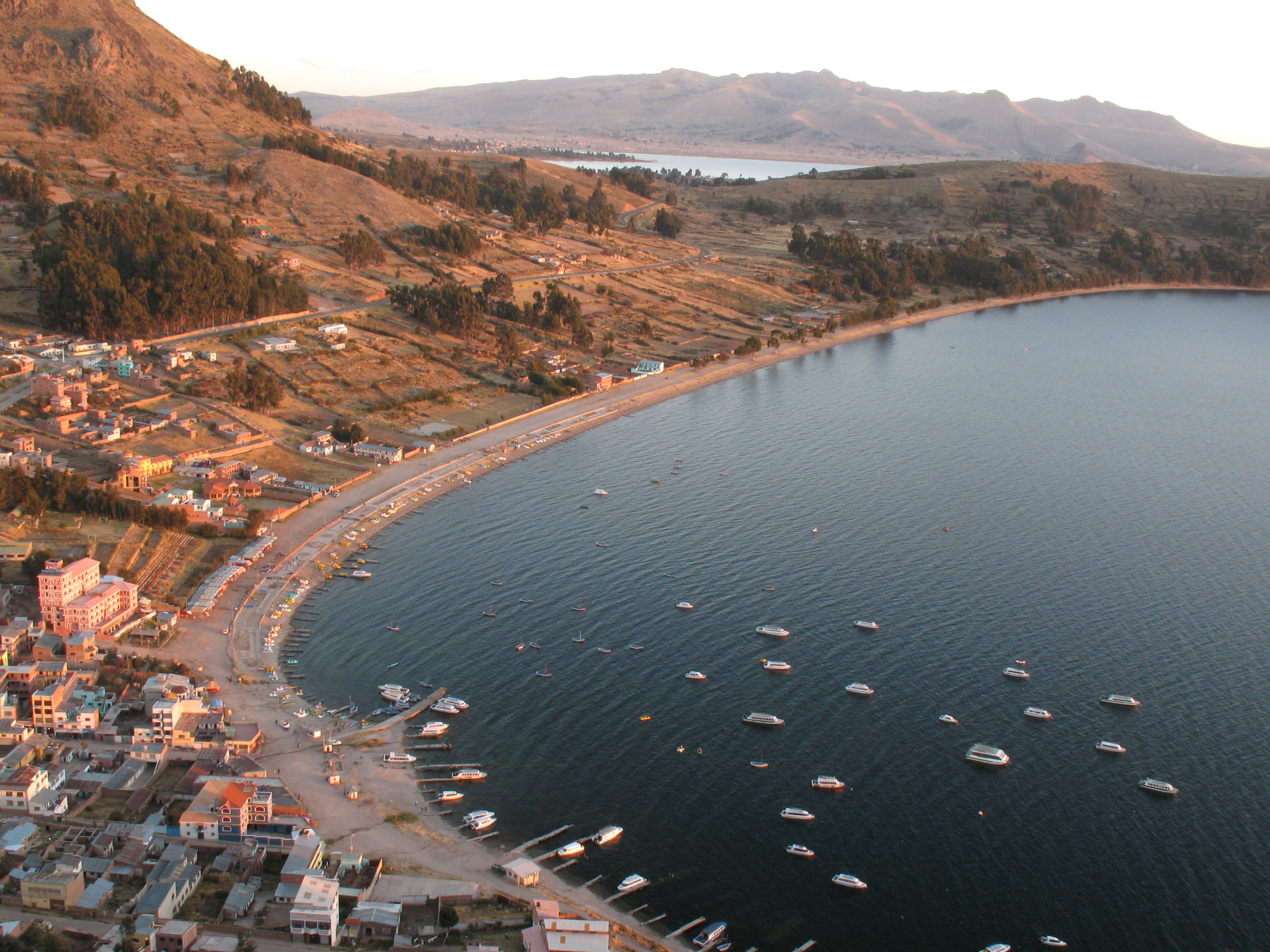
- View of Copacabana with Asiru Phat'jata in the background (on the right)

Highest point
- Elevation: 3,895 m (12,779 ft)
- Coordinates: 16°16′03″S 69°08′39″W

Geography
- Location within Peru
- Location: Peru, Puno Region

Asiru Phat'jata (Aymara asiru snake, phat'jaña to split in half, -ta a suffix to indicate the participle, "split snake") is a hill in Peru, situated at a height of about 3,895 metres (12,779 ft). It is located in the Puno Region, Yunguyo Province, Yunguyo District. Asiru Phat'jata lies near Lake Titicaca at the road which connects Yunguyo and Puno, south of the village Asiru Phat'jata (Acero Patjata) and north of the mountain Qhapiya.

On the hill there is an archaeological area. It was declared a National Cultural Heritage (Patrimonio Cultural) of Peru by the National Institute of Culture.

== Gallery ==
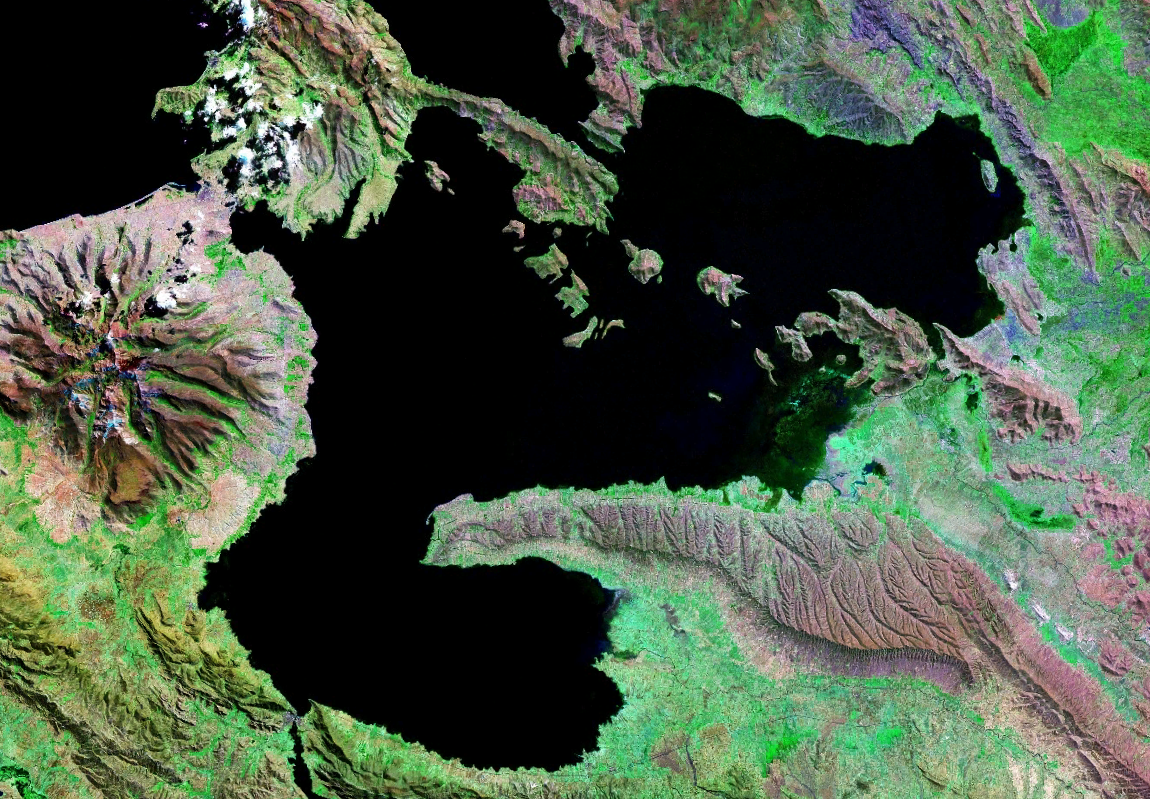
Satellite view of Wiñaymarka Lake, the southern sub-basin of Lake Titicaca, and the extinct volcano Qhapiya (on the left). Asiru Phat'jata is visible north of Qhapiya.
