= Intini Uyu Pata =

Archaeological site in Peru

- Interactive map of Intini Uyu Pata
- Location: Peru, Puno Region, Yunguyo Province
- Region: Andes

Site notes
- Height: 3,867 m (12,687 ft)

Intini Uyu Pata or Inti Uyu (Aymara inti sun, uyu pen (enclosure), yard, cemetery) is an archaeological site in Peru. It is located in the Puno Region, Yunguyo Province, between the districts Ollaraya and Unicachi, at a height of about 3,867 m (12,687 ft). The site was declared a National Cultural Heritage (Patrimonio Cultural) of Peru by the National Institute of Culture.

== See also ==
- Tupu Inka
