= Uru–Chipaya languages =

Family of languages spoken by the Uro people

Uru–Chipaya
- Uruquilla
- Geographic distribution: Lakes Titicaca and Poopo, Bolivia
- Ethnicity: Uru
- Linguistic classification: One of the world's primary language families
- Subdivisions: Chipaya; Uru †; Uru of Chʼimu †; Murato †

Language codes
- Glottolog: uruc1242
- Linguasphere: 84-MAA
- Current distribution of Uru-Chipaya-speaking peoples

The Uru–Chipaya family is an indigenous language family of Bolivia.

The speakers were originally fishermen on the shores of Lake Titicaca, Lake Poopó, and the Desaguadero River.

Chipaya has over a thousand speakers and sees vigorous use in the native community, but all other Uru languages or dialects are extinct.

Loukotka (1968) also lists the Chango language, once spoken on the coast of Chile from Huasco to Cobija in Antofagasta Province. According to Loukotka that population would have been Araucanized at some point in history. More modern classifications leave it unclassified, as only proper names and placenames are known (Mason 1950).

== Proposed external relationships ==
Stark (1972) proposed a Maya–Yunga–Chipayan macrofamily linking Mayan with Uru–Chipaya and Yunga (Mochica).

== Language contact ==
Jolkesky (2016) notes that there are lexical similarities with the Kunza, Pukina, Pano, Jaqi, Kechua, Mapudungun, and Moseten-Tsimane language families due to contact.

== Bibliography ==
- Aguiló, F. (1986). El idioma de los Urus. Editora Centro Portales.
- Cerrón-Palomino, R. (2011). Chipaya. Léxico y etnotaxonomía. Lima: PUCP.
- Espinoza Soriano (1991). Proto-Takanan and Uru-Chipaya: genetic relationship or ancient loans? Comunicação apresentada em: Conferencia Internacional sobre Lenguaje, Política Oficial sobre el Lenguaje y Política Educativa en los Andes, 28–30 October 1991. Newark: University of Delaware.
- Hannß, K. (2008). Uchumataqu: The lost language of the Urus of Bolivia. A grammatical description of the language as documented between 1894 and 1952 (ILLA, 7). Leiden: CNWS Publications.
- Nimuendajú, K. (1928-1929). Wortliste der Šipáya-Indianer. Anthropos, 23:821-850, 24:863-896.
- Snethlage, E. (1932). Chipaya- und Curuaya-Wörter. Anthropos, 27:65-93.
- Vellard, J. A. (1949-1951). Contribution à l'étude des Indiens Uru ou Kot'suñs. Travaux de l'Institut Français d'études Andines, 1:145-209, 2:51-89, 3:3-39.
