= Copani District =

Coordinates: 16.3998°S 69.0403°W

Copani
- District
- Interactive map of Copani
- Country: Peru
- Region: Puno
- Province: Yunguyo
- Founded: December 28, 1984
- Capital: Copani

Government
  - Mayor: Aureliano Alejo Calisaya

Area
  - Total: 47.37 km^{2} (18.29 sq mi)
- Elevation: 3,854 m (12,644 ft)

Population (2007 census)
  - Total: 5,436
  - Density: 114.8/km^{2} (297.2/sq mi)
- Time zone: UTC-5 (PET)
- UBIGEO: 211303

Copani District is one of seven districts of the province Yunguyo in Puno Region, Peru.

== History ==
Copani District was created by Law No. 24042 (December 28, 1984), in second term of Fernando Belaúnde Terry.

== Ethnic groups ==
The people in the district are mainly indigenous citizens of Aymara descent. Aymara is the language which the majority of the population (89.37%) learnt to speak in childhood, 10.03% of the residents started speaking using the Spanish language (2007 Peru Census).

== Authorities ==
=== Mayors ===
- 2011-2014: Aureliano Alejo Calisaya.
- 2007-2010: Juan Nina Quispe.

== See also ==
- Administrative divisions of Peru
- Qhapiya
