= Cuturapi District =

Coordinates: 16.2703°S 69.1778°W

Cuturapi Quturapi
- District
- Interactive map of Cuturapi
- Country: Peru
- Region: Puno
- Province: Yunguyo
- Founded: December 28, 1984
- Capital: San Juan de Cuturapi

Government
  - Mayor: Valentin Huanchi

Area
  - Total: 21.74 km^{2} (8.39 sq mi)
- Elevation: 3,855 m (12,648 ft)

Population (2007 census)
  - Total: 1,598
  - Density: 73.51/km^{2} (190.4/sq mi)
- Time zone: UTC-5 (PET)
- UBIGEO: 211304

Cuturapi District is one of seven districts of the province Yunguyo in Peru.

== History ==
The Cuturapi District was created by Law No. 24042 (December 28, 1984), during the second term of Fernando Belaúnde Terry.

== Ethnic groups ==
The people in the district are mainly indigenous citizens of Aymara descent. Aymara is the language which the majority of the population (68.27%) learnt to speak in childhood, while 30.22% of the residents started speaking using the Spanish language (2007 Peru Census).

== Authorities ==
=== Mayors ===
- 2011-2014: Valentín Huanchi Huallpa.
- 2007-2010: Humberto Mamani Huanchi.

== See also ==
- Administrative divisions of Peru
- Qhapiya
