= Uru of Chʼimu =

Extinct Uru language of Peru

- Native to: Peru
- Region: Lake Titicaca, east of Puno
- Ethnicity: Uru people
- Extinct: after 1929
- Language family: Uru–Chipaya: Uru ?; Uru of Chʼimu

Language codes
- ISO 639-3: None (mis)
- Glottolog: tsim1260

Uru of Chʼimu is an extinct dialect of Uru or distinct Uru–Chipaya language once spoken by the Uros, an Indigenous people, who live on reed islands in Puno Bay in western Lake Titicaca in Peru. The language is known only from 324 words.

== History ==
=== Documentation ===
Chʼimu Uru was first identified in 1929 by Walter Lehmann, whose notes, comprising 324 words and some very basic grammatical notes, are in the Library of the Ibero-American Institute in Berlin. Torero (1992) claims that Uru of Chʼimu is the most divergent of the three Uru–Chipaya languages.
