= Tinicachi District =

Tinicachi
- District
- Interactive map of Tinicachi
- Coordinates: 16°11′55″S 68°58′20″W
- Country: Peru
- Region: Puno
- Province: Yunguyo
- Founded: December 28, 1984
- Capital: Tinicachi

Government
  - Mayor: Modesto Paredes

Area
  - Total: 6.2 km^{2} (2.4 sq mi)
- Elevation: 3,852 m (12,638 ft)

Population (2007 census)
  - Total: 1,490
  - Density: 240/km^{2} (620/sq mi)
- Time zone: UTC-5 (PET)
- UBIGEO: 211306

Tinicachi District is one of seven districts of the province Yunguyo in Puno Region, Peru.

== History ==
Tinicachi District was created by Law No. 24042 (December 28, 1984), in second term of Fernando Belaúnde Terry.

== Ethnic groups ==
The people in the district are mainly indigenous citizens of Aymara descent. Aymara is the language which the majority of the population (87.16%) learnt to speak in childhood, 12.21% of the residents started speaking using the Spanish language (2007 Peru Census).

== Authorities ==
=== Mayors ===
- 2011–2014: Modesto Paredes Vargas.
- 2007–2010: Alexander Bryan Uchasara Mamani.

== Festivities ==
- Ascension of Jesus.
- Our Lady of Luján.

== See also ==
- Administrative divisions of Peru
