= Unicachi District =

Coordinates: 16.2223°S 68.9907°W

Unicachi Unikachi
- District
- Interactive map of Unicachi
- Country: Peru
- Region: Puno
- Province: Yunguyo
- Founded: May 18, 1982
- Capital: Marcaja

Government
  - Mayor: José Coarita Yapuchura (2011-2014)

Area
  - Total: 11.1 km^{2} (4.3 sq mi)
- Elevation: 3,841 m (12,602 ft)

Population (2007 census)
  - Total: 3,571
  - Density: 322/km^{2} (833/sq mi)
- Time zone: UTC-5 (PET)
- UBIGEO: 211307
- Website: unicachi.com/unicachi.htm

Unicachi District is one of seven districts of the province Yunguyo in Puno Region, Peru.

== History ==
Unicachi District was created by Law No. 23382 (May 18, 1982), in second term of Fernando Belaúnde Terry.

== Ethnic groups ==
The people in the district are mainly indigenous citizens of Aymara descent. Aymara is the language which the majority of the population (68.45%) learnt to speak in childhood, 30.80% of the residents started speaking using the Spanish language (2007 Peru Census).

== Authorities ==
=== Mayors ===
- 2011-2014: José Coarita Yapuchura.
- 2007-2010: Elmer Ladislao Yapuchura Uchasara.

== Festivities ==
- Saint Peter and Saint Paul.
- Our Lady of the Rosary.

== See also ==
- Intini Uyu Pata
- Tupu Inka
- Administrative divisions of Peru
