= Ollaraya District =

Coordinates: 16.2195°S 68.9914°W

Ollaraya Ullaraya
- District
- Interactive map of Ollaraya
- Country: Peru
- Region: Puno
- Province: Yunguyo
- Founded: December 7, 1984
- Capital: San Miguel de Ollaraya

Government
  - Mayor: Pastor Alvarez Nina

Area
  - Total: 23.67 km^{2} (9.14 sq mi)
- Elevation: 3,881 m (12,733 ft)

Population (2007 census)
  - Total: 3,935
  - Density: 166.2/km^{2} (430.6/sq mi)
- Time zone: UTC-5 (PET)
- UBIGEO: 211305

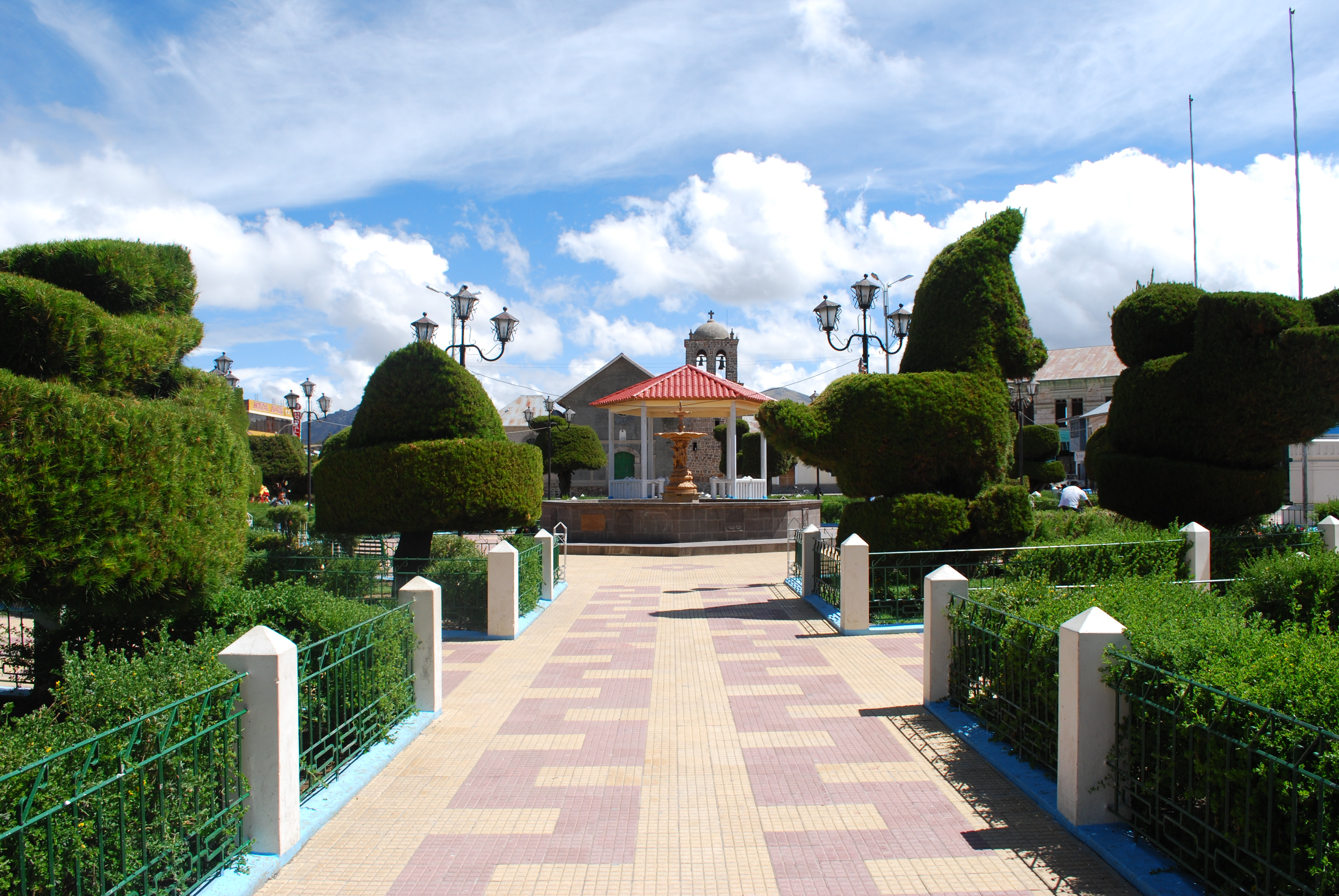
Yunguyo plaza

Ollaraya District is one of seven districts of the province Yunguyo in Puno, Peru.

== History ==
Tinicachi District was created by Law No. 24019 (December 24, 1984), in second term of Fernando Belaúnde Terry.

== Ethnic groups ==
The people in the district are mainly indigenous citizens of Aymara descent. Aymara is the language which the majority of the population (80.95%) learnt to speak in childhood, 18.81% of the residents started speaking using the Spanish language (2007 Peru Census).

== Authorities ==
=== Mayors ===
- 2011-2014: Pastor Alvarez Nina.
- 2007-2010: Alexander Bryan Uchasara Mamani.

== Festivities ==
- Ascension of Jesus.
- Our Lady of Luján.

== See also ==
- Intini Uyu Pata
- Administrative divisions of Peru
