= Yunguyo District =

Coordinates: 16.2442°S 69.0925°W

Yunguyo
- District
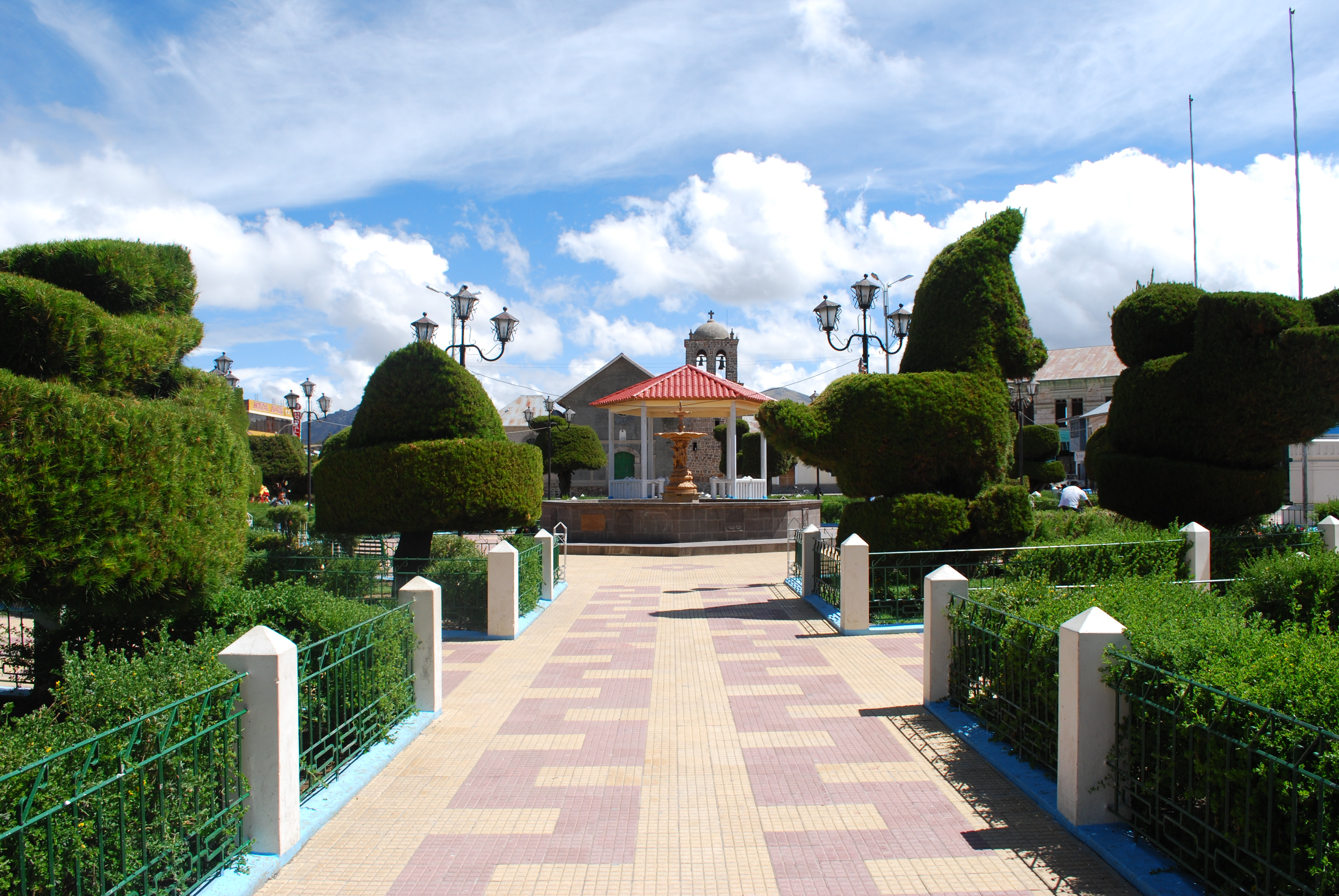
- Main square in Yunguyo
- Interactive map of Yunguyo
- Country: Peru
- Region: Puno
- Province: Yunguyo
- Capital: Yunguyo

Government
  - Mayor: Juan Huanca Coarita

Area
  - Total: 170.59 km^{2} (65.87 sq mi)
- Elevation: 3,826 m (12,552 ft)

Population (2005 census)
  - Total: 31,772
  - Density: 186.25/km^{2} (482.38/sq mi)
- Time zone: UTC-5 (PET)
- UBIGEO: 211301

Yunguyo District is one of seven districts of the province Yunguyo in Peru.

== Ethnic groups ==
The people in the district are mainly indigenous citizens of Aymara descent. Aymara is the language which the majority of the population (62.50%) learn to speak in childhood. 36.53% of the residents speak Spanish (2007 Peru Census).

== Climate ==
Climate data for Tahuaco–Yunguyo, elevation 3,888 m (12,756 ft), (1991–2020)
Month	Jan	Feb	Mar	Apr	May	Jun	Jul	Aug	Sep	Oct	Nov	Dec	Year
Mean daily maximum °C (°F)	14.7 (58.5)	14.9 (58.8)	15.0 (59.0)	15.1 (59.2)	14.5 (58.1)	13.4 (56.1)	13.2 (55.8)	14.1 (57.4)	14.9 (58.8)	15.8 (60.4)	16.5 (61.7)	15.8 (60.4)	14.8 (58.7)
Mean daily minimum °C (°F)	4.0 (39.2)	3.9 (39.0)	3.7 (38.7)	2.2 (36.0)	−0.4 (31.3)	−2.0 (28.4)	−2.0 (28.4)	−0.8 (30.6)	1.0 (33.8)	2.2 (36.0)	3.2 (37.8)	3.9 (39.0)	1.6 (34.9)
Average precipitation mm (inches)	174.3 (6.86)	145.0 (5.71)	120.3 (4.74)	41.0 (1.61)	11.4 (0.45)	10.4 (0.41)	9.7 (0.38)	18.5 (0.73)	27.0 (1.06)	47.3 (1.86)	54.6 (2.15)	98.7 (3.89)	758.2 (29.85)
Source: National Meteorology and Hydrology Service of Peru

== See also ==
- Asiru Phat'jata
- Qhapiya
