= Yunguyo province =

Coordinates: 16°14′39″S 69°05′34″W

Yunguyo
- Province
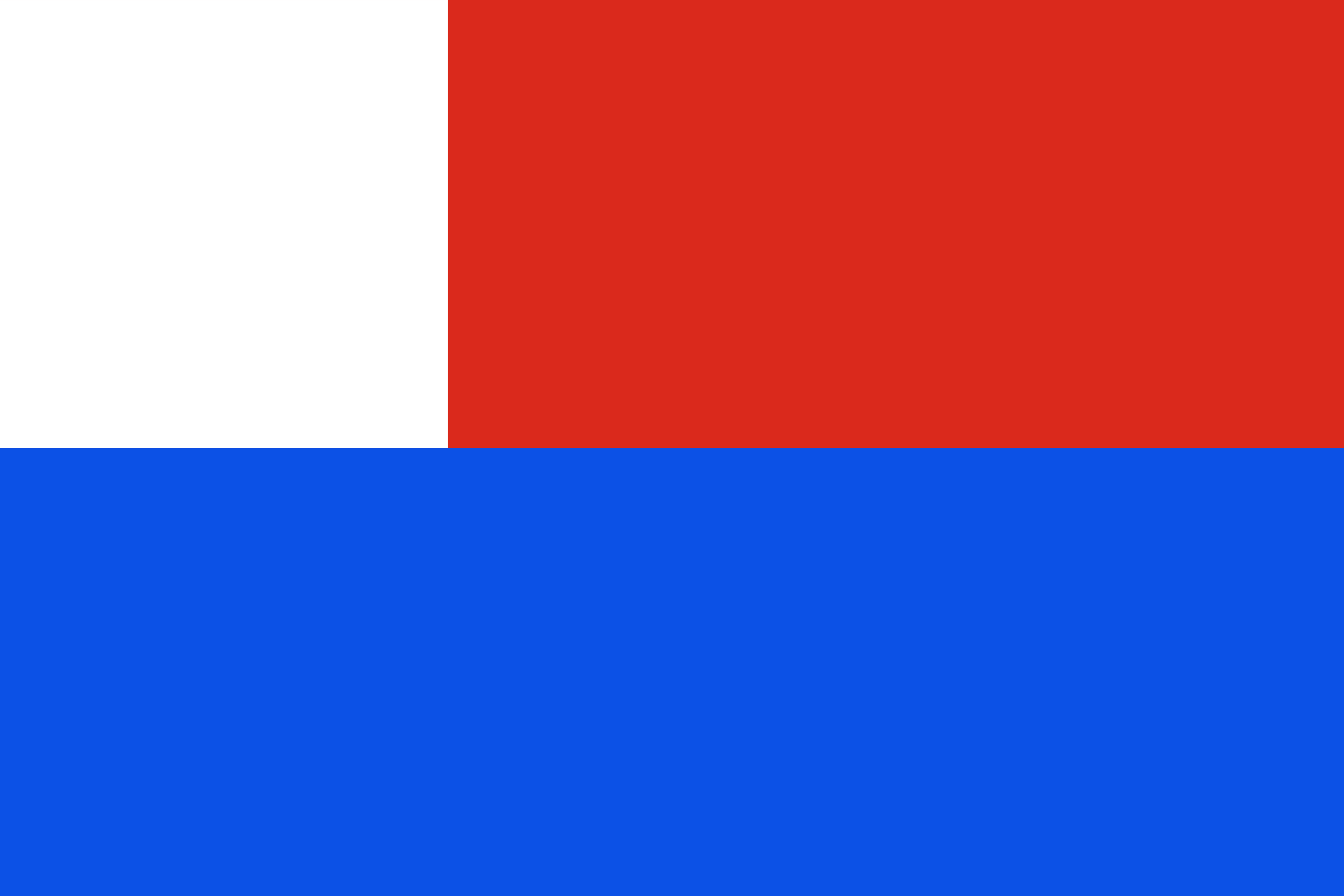
- Flag Coat of arms

- Location of Yunguyo in the Puno Region
- Country: Peru
- Region: Puno
- Capital: Yunguyo

Government
  - Mayor: Juan Huanca Coarita

Area
  - Total: 290.21 km^{2} (112.05 sq mi)
- Elevation: 3,826 m (12,552 ft)

Population
  - Total: 50,672
  - Density: 174.60/km^{2} (452.22/sq mi)
- UBIGEO: 2113
- Website: www.muniyunguyo.gob.pe

Yunguyo is a province of the Puno Region in Peru. The capital of the province is the city of Yunguyo.

== Political division ==
The province measures 290.21 square kilometres (112.05 sq mi) and is divided into seven districts:

District	Mayor	Capital	Ubigeo
Anapia	Jose Fabian Flores Velasco	Anapia	211302
Copani	Juan Nina Quispe	Copani	211303
Cuturapi	Humberto Mamani Huanchi	Cuturapi	211304
Ollaraya	Gregorio Oscco Chipana	Ollaraya	211305
Tinicachi	Alexander Bryan Uchasara Mamani	Tinicachi	211306
Unicachi	Elmer Ladislao Yapuchura Uchasara	Unicachi	211307
Yunguyo	Juan Huanca Coarita	Yunguyo	211301

== Ethnic groups ==
The people in the province are mainly indigenous citizens of Aymara descent. Aymara is the language which the majority of the population (67.84%) learnt to speak in childhood, 31.34% of the residents started speaking using the Spanish language and 0.56 % using Quechua (2007 Peru Census).

== See also ==
- Asiru Phat'jata
- Intini Uyu Pata
- Qhapiya
- Tupu Inka
