= Anapia District =

Coordinates: 16.2919°S 68.8720°W

Anapia
- District
- Interactive map of Anapia
- Country: Peru
- Region: Puno
- Province: Yunguyo
- Founded: June 1, 1983
- Capital: Anapia

Government
  - Mayor: José Fabian Flores Velasco

Area
  - Total: 9.54 km^{2} (3.68 sq mi)
- Elevation: 3,856 m (12,651 ft)

Population (2007 census)
  - Total: 2,400
  - Density: 250/km^{2} (650/sq mi)
- Time zone: UTC-5 (PET)
- UBIGEO: 2294

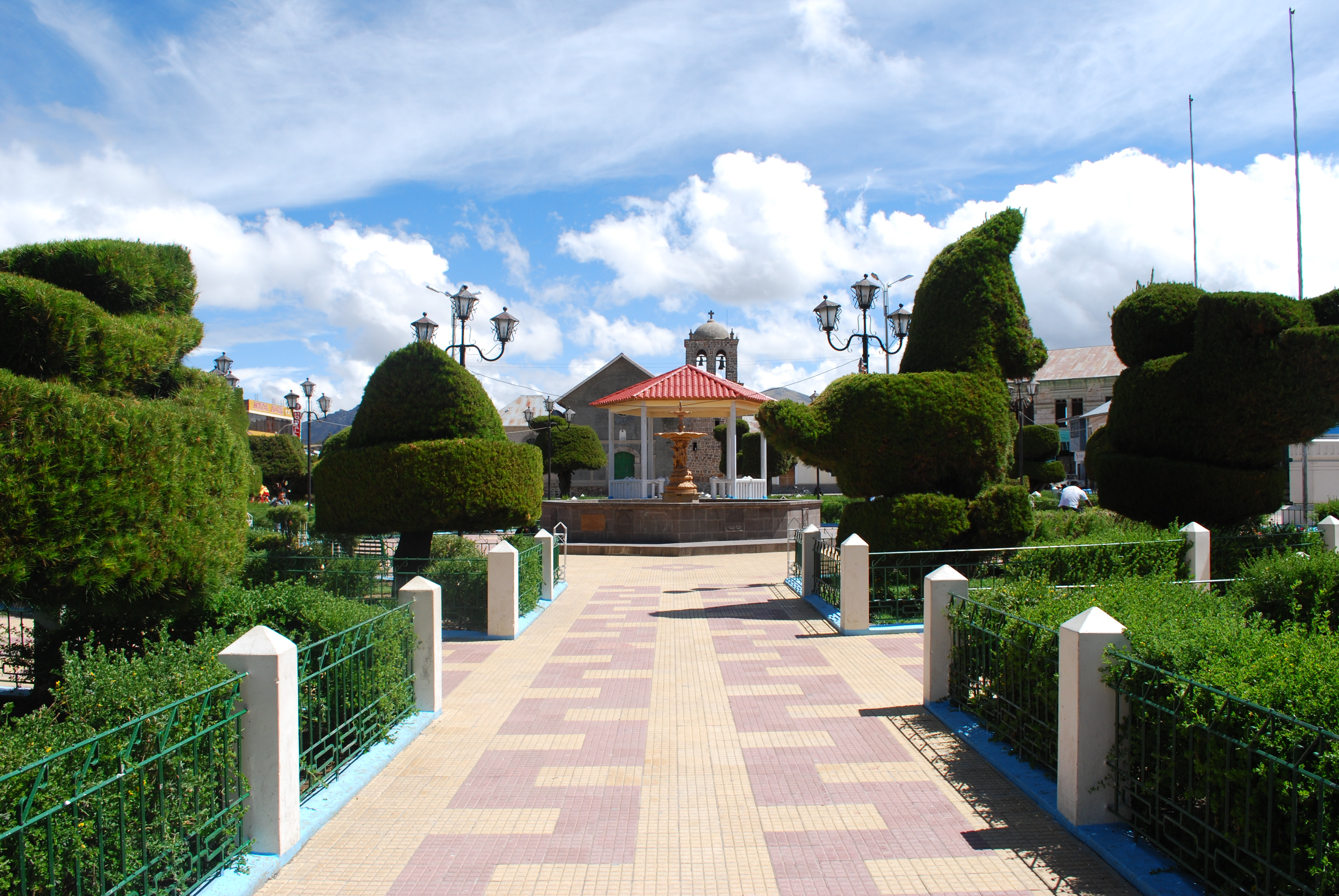
An image of Yunguyo plaza

Anapia District is one of seven districts of the province Yunguyo in Puno Region, Peru.

== History ==
Anapia District was created by Law No. 236062 (18, 1983), in second term of Fernando Belaúnde Terry.

== Climate ==
Climate data for Isla Suana, Anapia, elevation 3,840 m (12,600 ft), (1991–2020)
Month	Jan	Feb	Mar	Apr	May	Jun	Jul	Aug	Sep	Oct	Nov	Dec	Year
Mean daily maximum °C (°F)	15.1 (59.2)	15.0 (59.0)	15.0 (59.0)	15.2 (59.4)	14.9 (58.8)	13.8 (56.8)	13.4 (56.1)	14.2 (57.6)	14.9 (58.8)	15.9 (60.6)	16.4 (61.5)	15.8 (60.4)	15.0 (58.9)
Mean daily minimum °C (°F)	6.5 (43.7)	6.5 (43.7)	6.4 (43.5)	5.7 (42.3)	3.6 (38.5)	2.1 (35.8)	1.9 (35.4)	2.6 (36.7)	4.2 (39.6)	5.5 (41.9)	6.6 (43.9)	6.1 (43.0)	4.8 (40.7)
Average precipitation mm (inches)	196.1 (7.72)	181.0 (7.13)	126.3 (4.97)	44.1 (1.74)	12.9 (0.51)	10.5 (0.41)	10.5 (0.41)	17.7 (0.70)	24.2 (0.95)	48.0 (1.89)	61.8 (2.43)	114.2 (4.50)	847.3 (33.36)
Source: National Meteorology and Hydrology Service of Peru

== Authorities ==
=== Mayors ===
- 2011-2014: Francisco Limachi Froilán Escobar.
- 2007-2010: José Fabián Flores Velasco.

== See also ==
- Administrative divisions of Peru
