= Chipaya language =

Uru–Chipaya language of Bolivia

Chipaya
- Chipay taqu
- Native to: Bolivia
- Region: Oruro Department
- Native speakers: 1,800 (2012)
- Language family: Uru–Chipaya: Chipaya

Language codes
- ISO 639-3: cap
- Glottolog: chip1262
- ELP: Chipaya
- Linguasphere: 84-MAA-ba

Chipaya (Note: Also Achipaye.) (Chipaya: Chipay taqu) is an Indigenous South American language of the Uru–Chipaya language family, spoken by 1,800 of the Chipaya people.

== Classification ==
Chipaya is related to the Uru (Uchumataqu) and Uru of Chʼimu languages, both of which are now extinct, in a language family termed Uru–Chipaya. Even though Uru and Chipaya are closely related, they are "probably" not mutually intellligible.

== Status ==
Ethnologue lists the language vitality as "vigorous," with 1,800 speakers out of an ethnic population of around 2,100, although younger generations speak it progressively less.

== History ==
=== Documentation ===
Max Uhle visited the Uru-Chipaya language area in 1894 and collected data on both Uru and Chipaya. Alfred Métraux and Arthur Posnansky also documented both languages. Ronald Olson further documented Chipaya, particularly extensively with respect to lexical material. Liliane Porterie Gutiérrez conducted "substantial" research on Chipaya during the 1980s, though her death prevented the publication of many of her materials. Beginning in 2001, Rodolfo Cerrón-Palomino began a new documentation project on the language.

== Geographical distribution ==
The Chipaya language is spoken in the area south of Lake Titicaca along the Desaguadero River in the mountains of Bolivia and mainly in the town of Chipaya located in the Sabaya Province of the Bolivian department of Oruro north of Coipasa Salt Flats. Native speakers generally refer to it as Chipay taqu or Puquina or Uchun Maa Taqu ("our mother language"), but is not the same as, nor in fact even related to, the extinct Puquina language.

== Phonology ==
=== Consonants ===
		Labial	Dental/ Alveolar		Retroflex	Post-alv./ Palatal	Velar		Uvular	
		Labial	Dental/ Alveolar		Retroflex	Post-alv./ Palatal	plain	labialized	plain	labialized
Nasal		m /m/	n /n/			ň /ɲ/	ŋ /ŋ/			
Plosive	plain	p /p/	t /t/				k /k/	kʷ /kʷ/	q /q/	qʷ /qʷ/
Plosive	aspirated	ph /pʰ/	th /tʰ/				kh /kʰ/		qh /qʰ/	
Plosive	ejective	p' /pʼ/	t' /tʼ/				k' /kʼ/		q' /qʼ/	
Affricate	plain		¢ /ts/		ĉ /tʂ/	č /tʃ/				
Affricate	aspirated		¢h /tsʰ/		ĉh /tʂʰ/	čh /tʃʰ/				
Affricate	ejective		¢' /tsʼ/		ĉ' /tʂʼ/	č' /tʃʼ/				
Fricative			z /s̪/	s /s/	ŝ /ʂ/		h /x/	hʷ /xʷ/	x /χ/	xʷ /χʷ/
Rhotic			r /r/							
Lateral			l /l/			ll /ʎ/	lj /ʟ/			
Approximant						y /j/		w /w/		

=== Consonant clusters ===
Multiple possibilities are separated by slashes, and optional elements are enclosed in parentheses.

Possible syllable onsets are:

- (s/ŝ) + p + (h)
- (s/ŝ/sh) + k/q + (h/hʷ/x/xʷ)
- s/ŝ + p/k/kʷ/q/qʷ/h/hʷ/m/n
- t + h/hʷ/x/xʷ
- ¢/ĉ/č/l + h

Possible syllable codas are:

- h/x + p/t/k/q/l/ll/r + (t)
- hʷ/xʷ + k/q + (t)
- Consonant + t

=== Vowels ===
	Front	Central	Back
High	i /i/		u /u/
Mid	e /e/		o /o/
Low		a /a/	

- Each vowel can be short, e.g., a [a], or long, e.g., a• [aː].

== Grammar ==
Chipaya is an agglutinative language, though it has features uncommon to most agglutinative languages, according to preliminary research by the organization DOBES.
