= Tupu Inka =

Archaeological site in Peru

Coordinates: 16.2241°S 68.9698°W

- Interactive map of Tupu Inka
- Location: Peru, Puno Region
- Region: Andes

Tupu Inka (Aymara and Quechua tupu general word for measure / Incan measurement for a certain distance, Quechua tupu brooch, Inka Inca) is an archaeological site in Peru. It is located in the Puno Region, Yunguyo Province, Unicachi District.
