= Uru people =

Indigenous people of Bolivia and Peru

Uru
Qhas Qut suñi
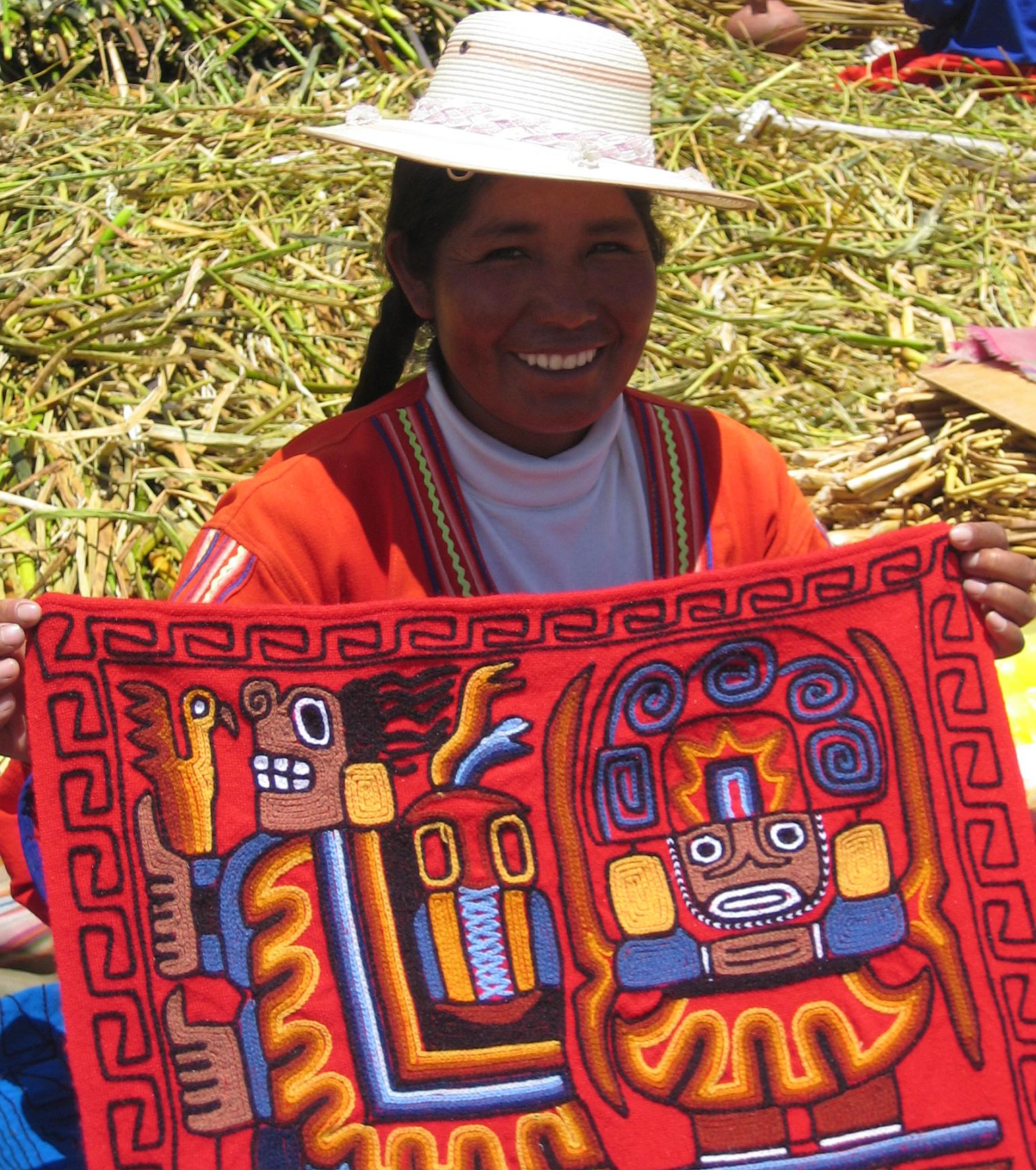
- Uro woman selling handicrafts

Total population
- 5,343

Regions with significant populations
- Lake Titicaca islands, Puno, Peru and Bolivia
- Bolivia: 3,343
- Peru: 2,000

Languages
- Aymara • Spanish • Uru

Religion
- Christianity

Related ethnic groups
- Aymaras

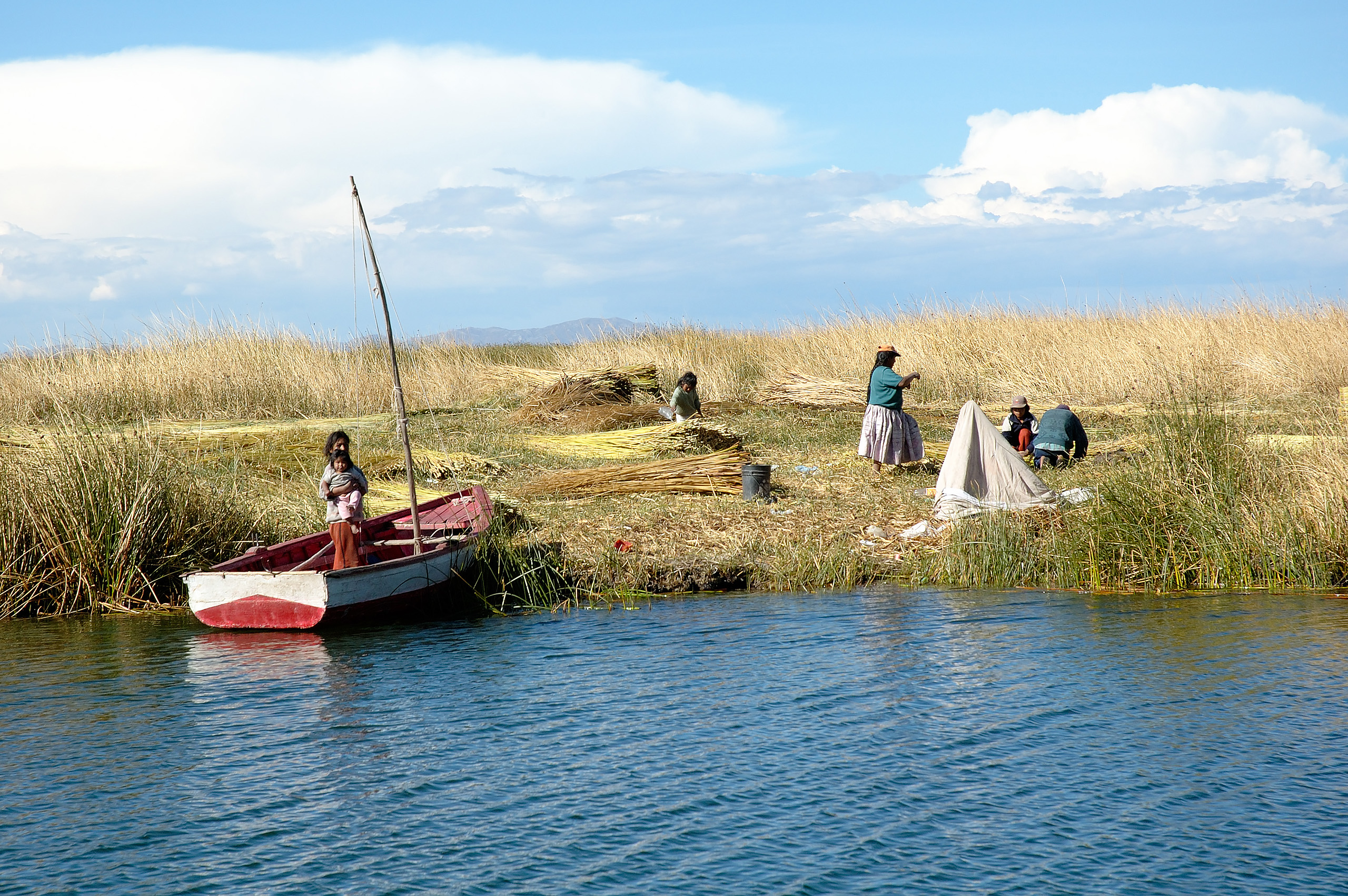
Uros harvesting totora on Lake Titicaca near the city of Puno.

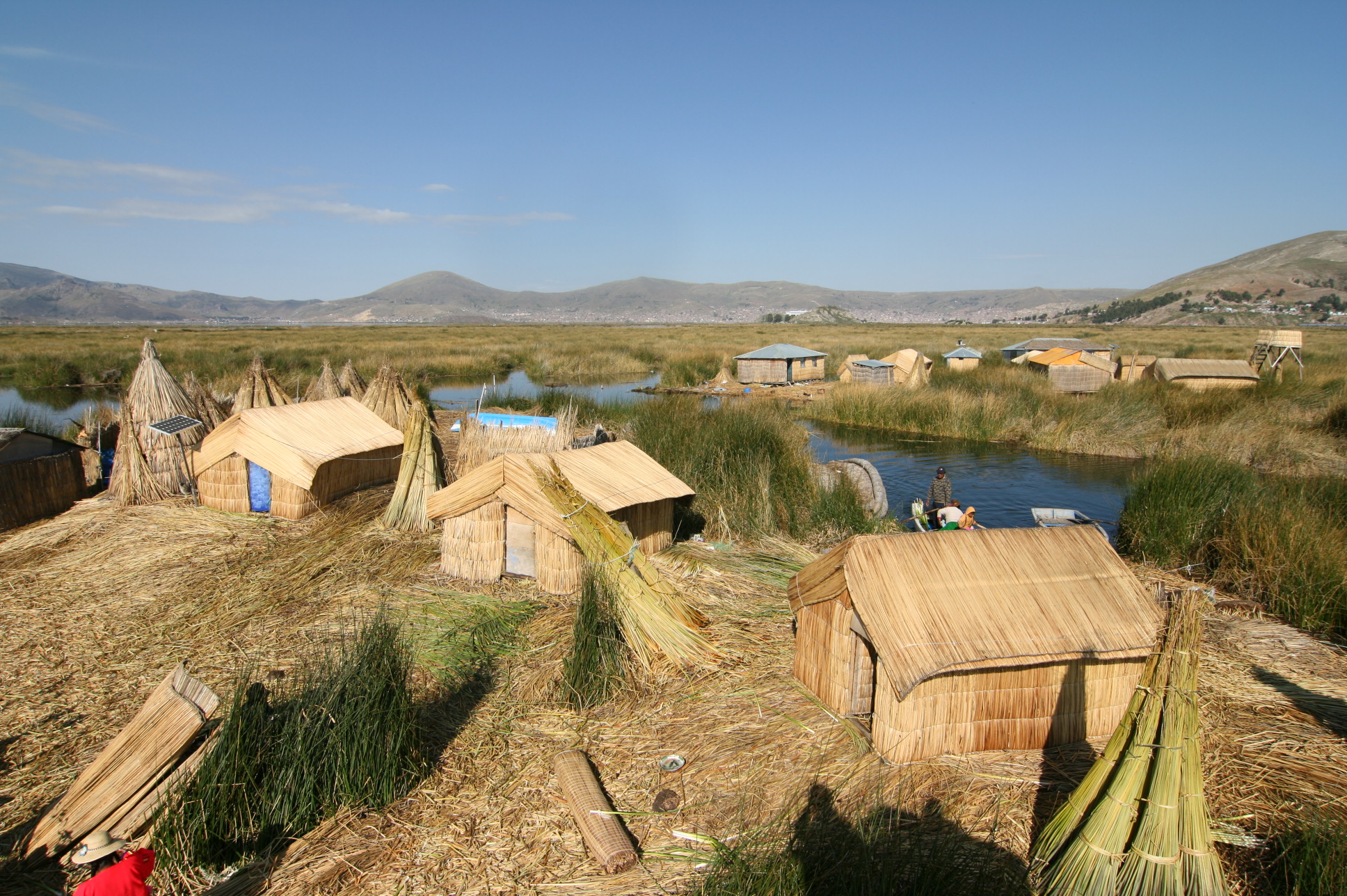
Uros island view

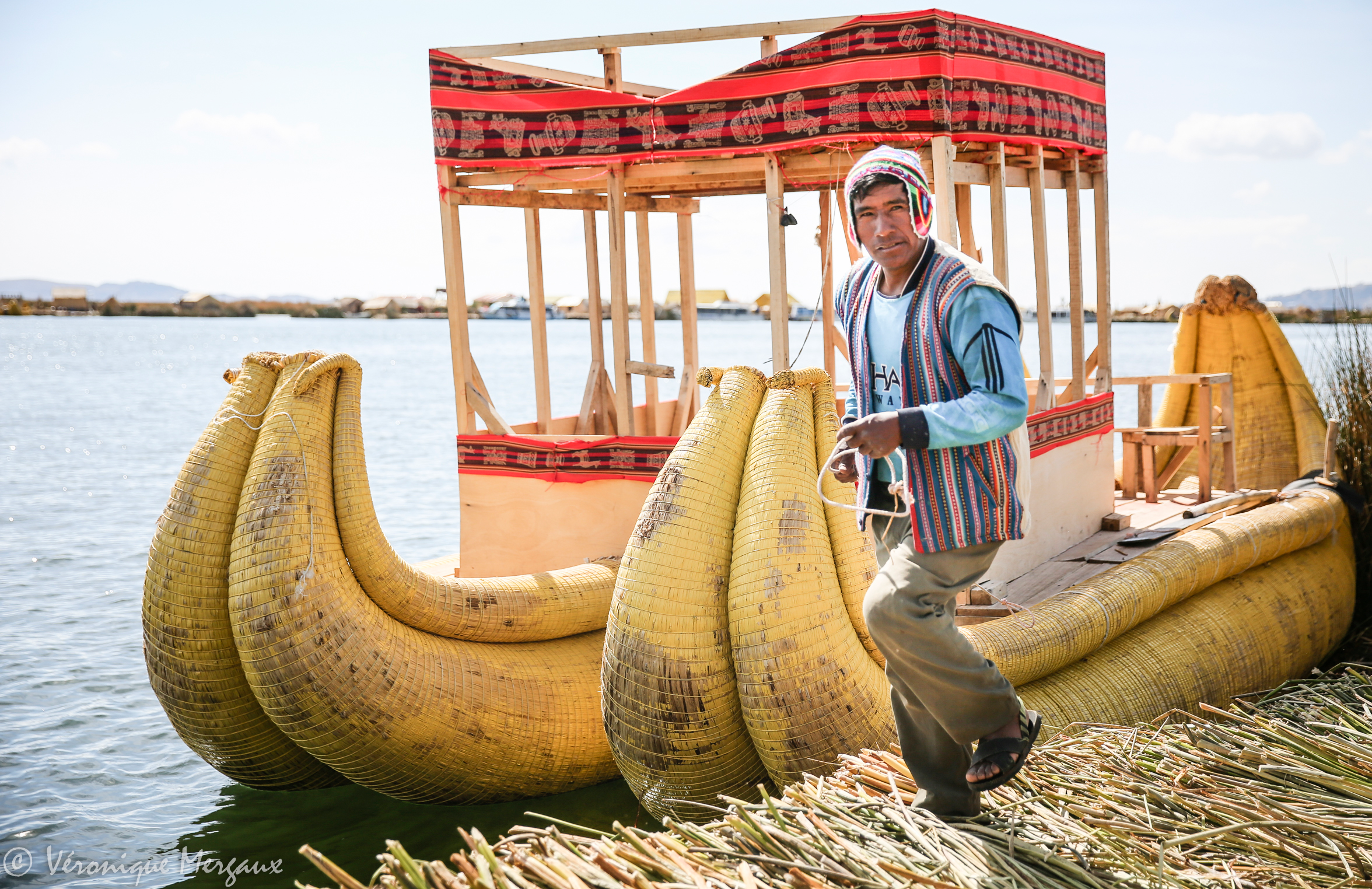
Uro man working on his reed boat.

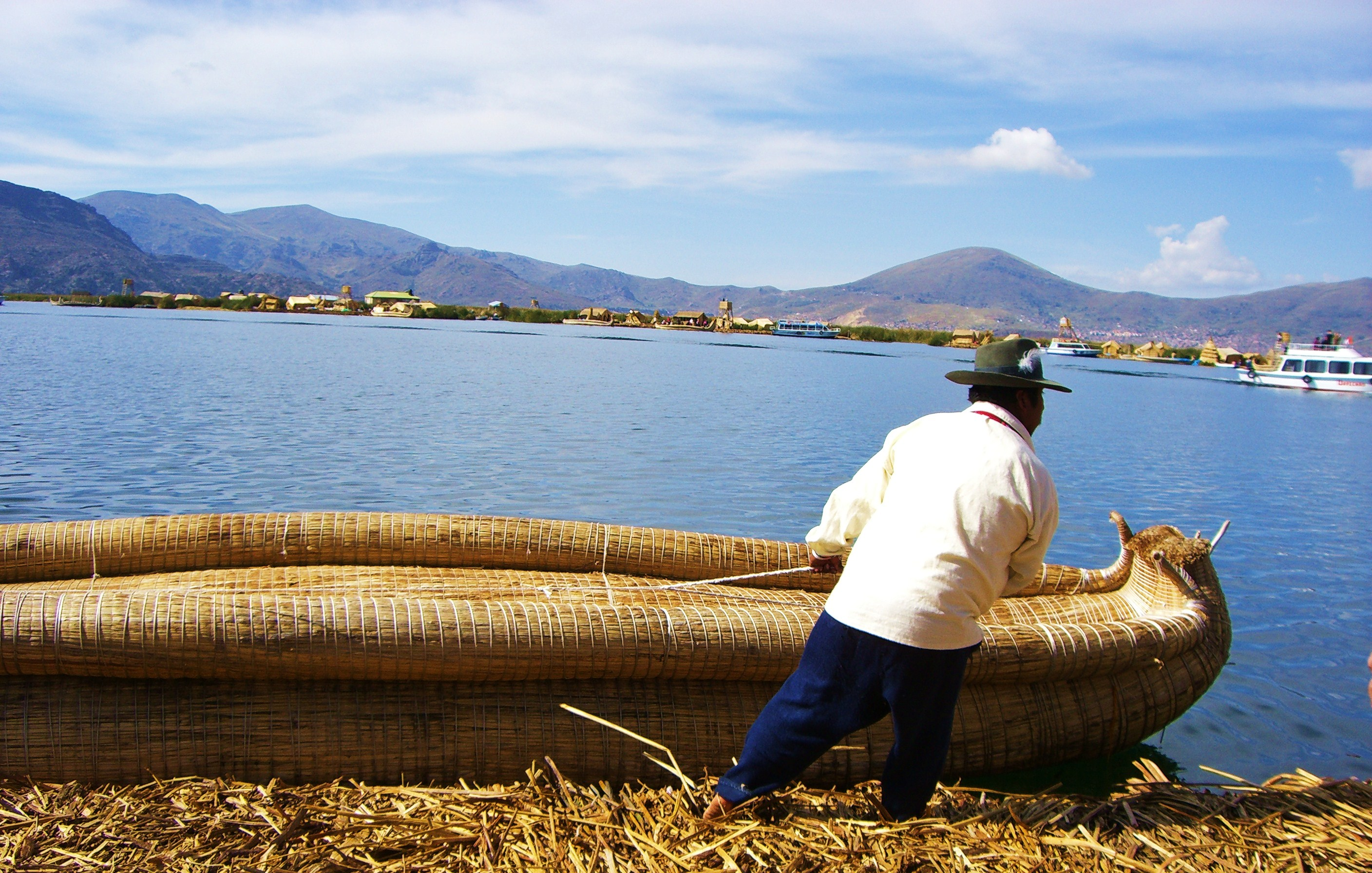
Uro man pulling boat made of reeds

The Uru or Uros (Uru: Qhas Qut suñi) are an indigenous people of Bolivia and Peru. They live on a still-growing group of about 120 self-fashioned floating islands in Lake Titicaca near Puno. They form three main groups: the Uru-Chipaya, Uru-Murato, and Uru-Iruito. The Uru-Iruito still inhabit the Bolivian side of Lake Titicaca and the Desaguadero River.

The indigenous Urus have darker skin than their neighbours Aymaras and Quechuas.

== History ==
While most of the Uru have shifted to Aymara and Spanish, two people still spoke in 2004 the nearly extinct Uru language, which is closely related to the Chipaya language.

The Uru considered themselves the owners of the lake and water. According to the legend, Uru used to say that they had black blood, because they did not feel the cold. They historically called themselves Lupihaques, "sons of the Sun". Although the Uru language is extinct, the Uru continue to maintain their identity and some old customs.

The purpose of the island settlements was originally defensive: they could be moved if a threat arose. Many of the islands include a watchtower.

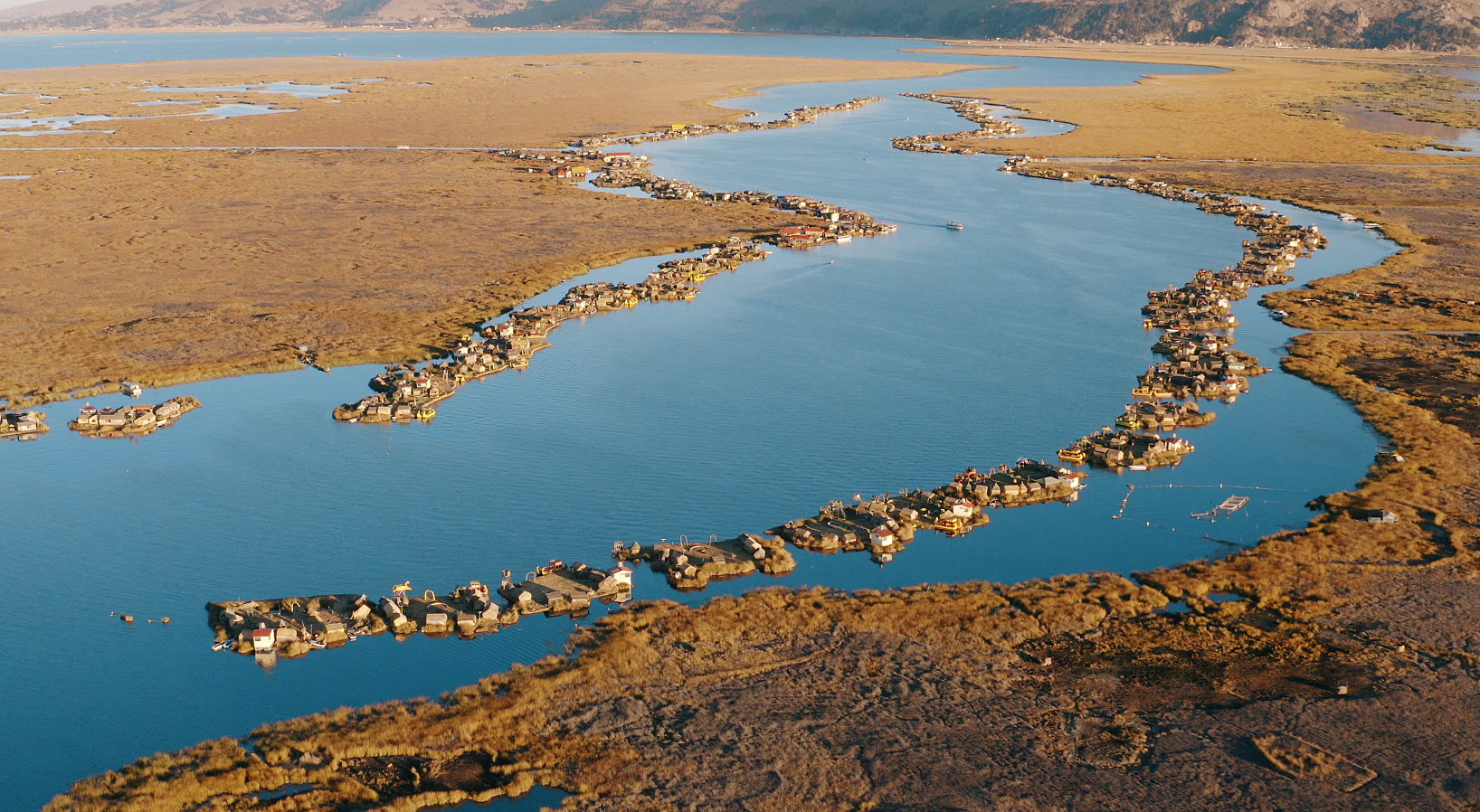
The Uros Floating Islands as seen from the air, about 5 km (3.1 mi) off the coast of Puno.

The Uru traded with the Aymara tribe on the mainland, intermarrying with them and eventually abandoning the Uru language for that of the Aymara. They lost their original language about 500 years ago. When conquered by the Inca Empire, they had to pay taxes to them, and often were enslaved.

Starting from 1722 a conflict arose between the Uru and Aymara people, but these conflicts ended in the 1970s when the Aymara defeated the Uru, and took permanent control of the lands that belonged to them.

== Reed island construction ==
The Uru use bundles of dried Totora reeds to make reed boats (balsas), and to make the islands themselves.

The larger islands house about ten families, while smaller ones, only about thirty meters wide, house only two or three families. Each island lasts about 25 years. After 25 years, water seeps through the reeds and the inhabitants build a new island and let the old one sink to the bottom of the lake.

The islets are made of multiple natural layers harvested in Lake Titicaca. The base is made of large pallets of floating totora roots, which are tied together with ropes and covered in multiple layers of totora reeds. These dense roots that the plants develop and interweave form a natural layer called khili (about one to two meters thick), which are the main flotation and stability devices of the islands.

Each floating block of khili measures approximately 4 m × 10 m (13 ft × 33 ft). The blocks used to be harvested with eucalyptus wedges, but are now sourced using 1.5 m (4.9 ft) long metal saws custom made for this purpose. They are anchored with ropes attached to large eucalyptus poles driven into the bottom of the lake.

Once the khili pallets are tied together and anchored, multiple layers of cut reeds are added. The bottom layer of covering reeds rot away fairly quickly, so new reeds are added to the top constantly, about every two weeks to three months depending on weather. This is especially important in the rainy season when the reeds rot much faster.

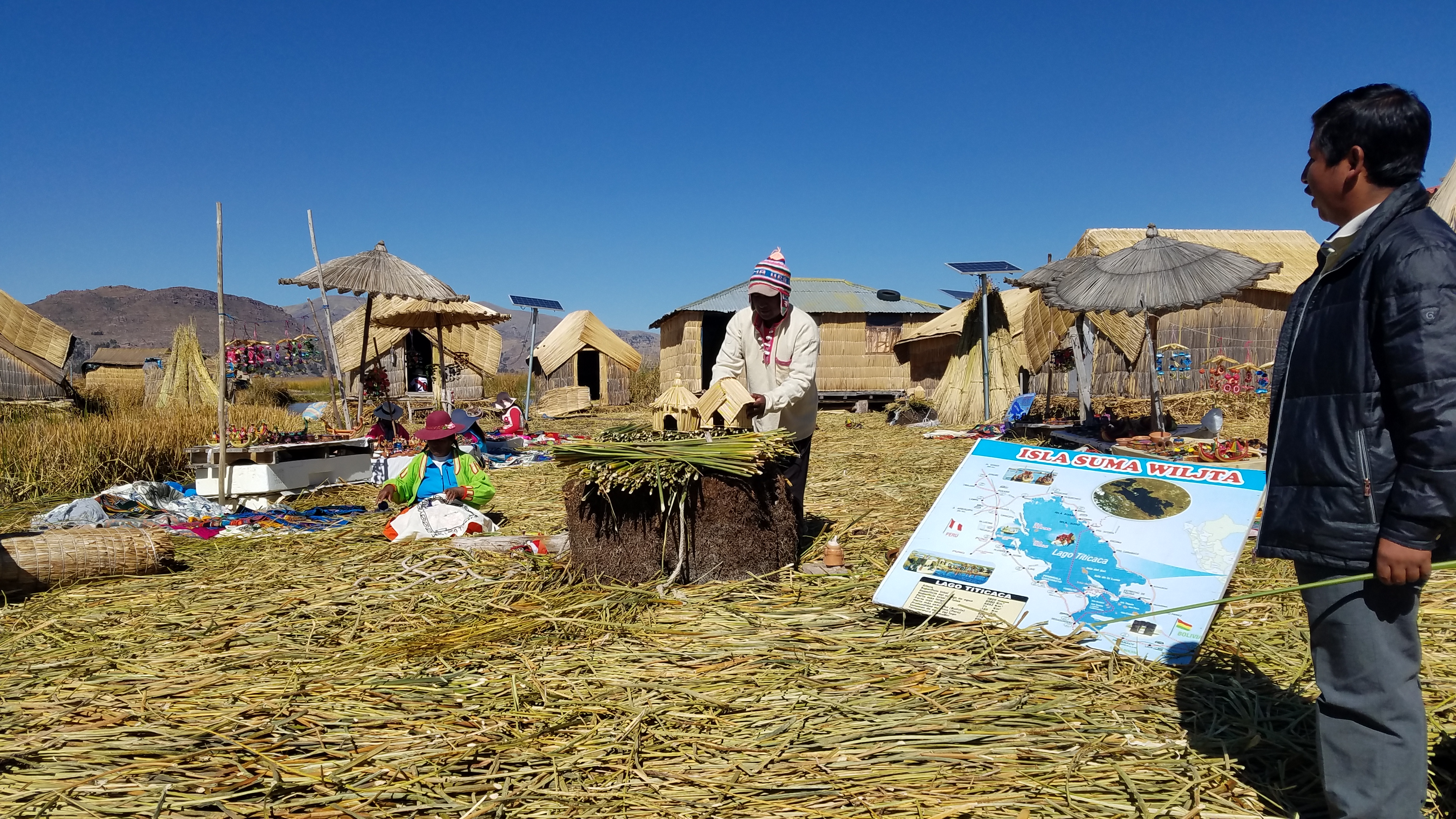
A local Uru island chief explaining the structure of an Uros Floating Island, with roots on the bottom, and reeds added atop with subsequent buildings.

Tourism via boats from Puno has become the primary financial income for people living on the islands.

The Uru's islands are located at 3,810 m (12,500 ft) above sea level, and just five kilometers east from the Puno port. Around 2,000 descendants of the Uru were counted in the 1997 census, although only a few hundred still live on and maintain the islands; most have moved to the mainland. The Uru also bury their dead on the mainland in special cemeteries.

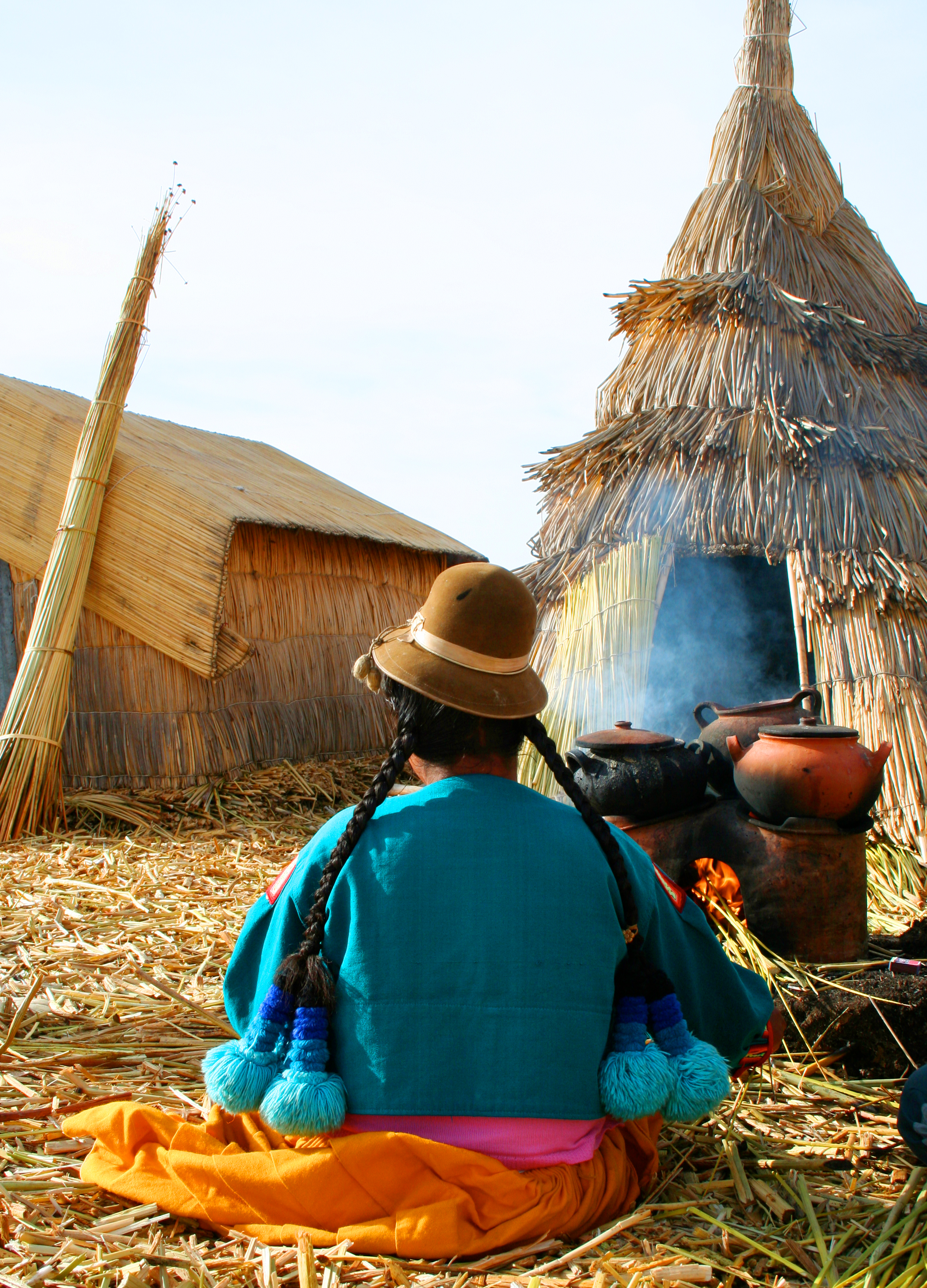
A Uro woman cooking in pottery stoves.

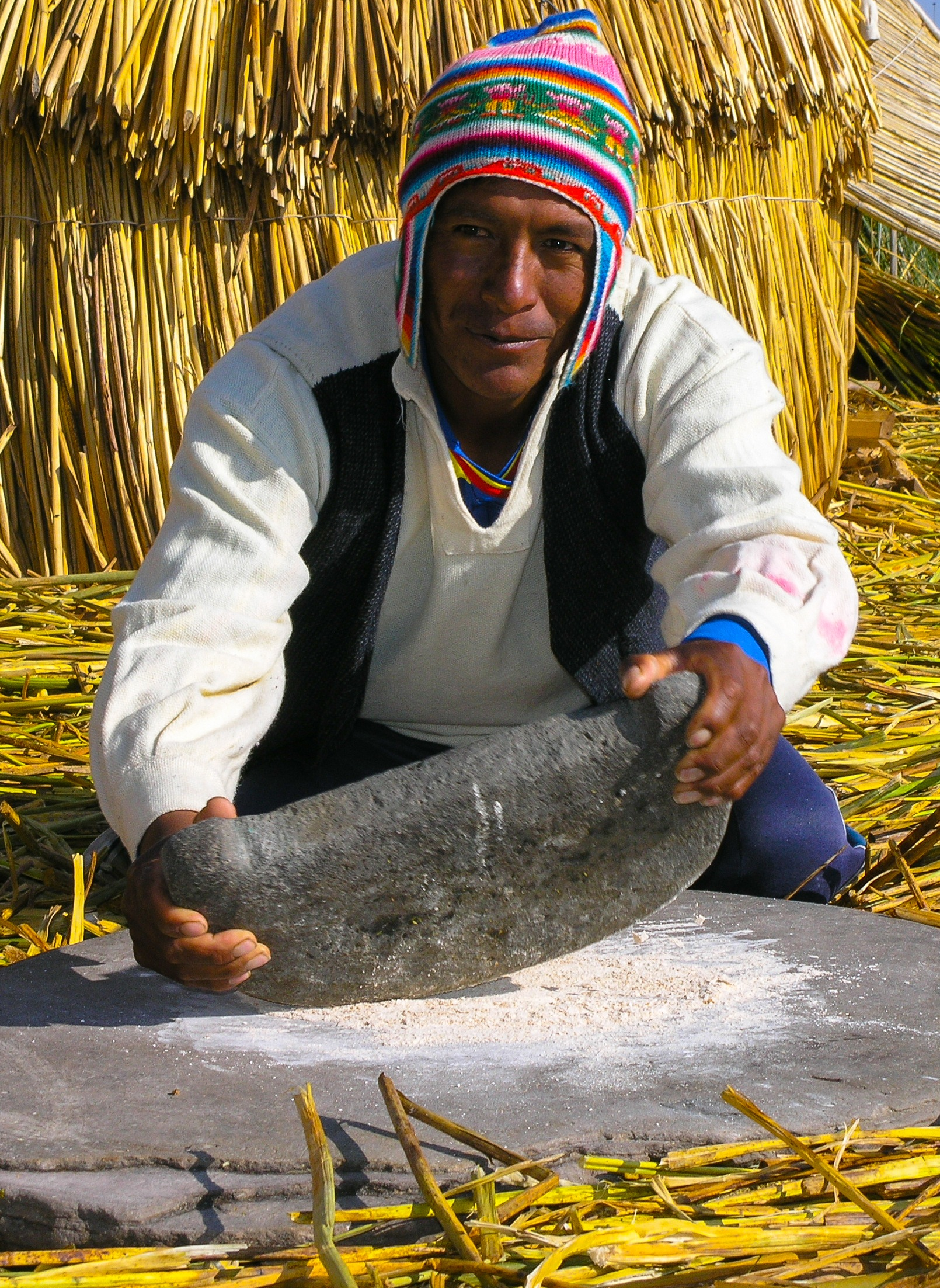
A Uro man using a flat stone mortar and pestle to grind Quinoa.

Food is classically cooked in pots on pottery stoves; these are placed on flat stones to prevent the flammable reed islands from catching fire. To relieve themselves, tiny "outhouse" islands are placed near the main islands with simple toilets installed in them. The ground root absorbs the waste.

Most islands feature a standardized shower building with tile roofs, water heating cells and a hot water boiler to allow for warm showers.

Houses on the floating islands are mostly made of reeds too; some have corrugated metal roofs. Few are insulated. All houses are built on top of an extra 1 m (3.3 ft) layer of dry reeds to prevent rheumatism.

== Traditional lifestyle ==
Much of the Urus' diet and medicine also revolve around the same totora reeds used to construct the islands. When a reed is pulled, the white bottom is often eaten for iodine to prevent goitres. This white part of the reed is called the chullo (Aymara [tʃʼuʎo]). The Uru rely on totora reeds in the same way that the Andean people of Peru rely on the coca leaf for relief from hunger and the harsh climate. When in pain, they may wrap the reed around the body part that is in pain.

If it is hot outside, they sometimes roll the white part of the reed in their hands and split it open, placing the reed on their forehead. In this form, it is very cool to the touch. The white part of the reed is also used to help ease alcohol-related hangovers. The totora reeds are a primary source of food. The Uru also make a reed flower tea.

Local residents fish ispi, carachi and catfish. Trout was introduced to the lake from Canada in 1940, and kingfish was introduced from Argentina. Uru also hunt birds such as seagulls, ducks and flamingos, and graze their cattle on the islets. They also run crafts stalls aimed at the numerous tourists who visit ten of the islands each year. They barter totora reeds on the mainland in Puno to get products they need, such as quinoa and other foods.

== Domesticated animals ==
The Uru people have domesticated local animals to assist with producing food and other purposes. For example, cormorants, waterbirds who catch fish, are kept tethered with wool tied to their feet, so that they can catch fish for human consumption. Another local bird, the ibis, is domesticated for laying eggs. Ibis are also butchered for meat. To control rats on the reed islands, domestic cats are also kept by the Uru islanders.

Some islands also feature ponds inside the island; yet again some of these are lined with a large fishing net and suggest localised aquaculture. The primary amount of fish is still caught in the wide open of Lake Titicaca.

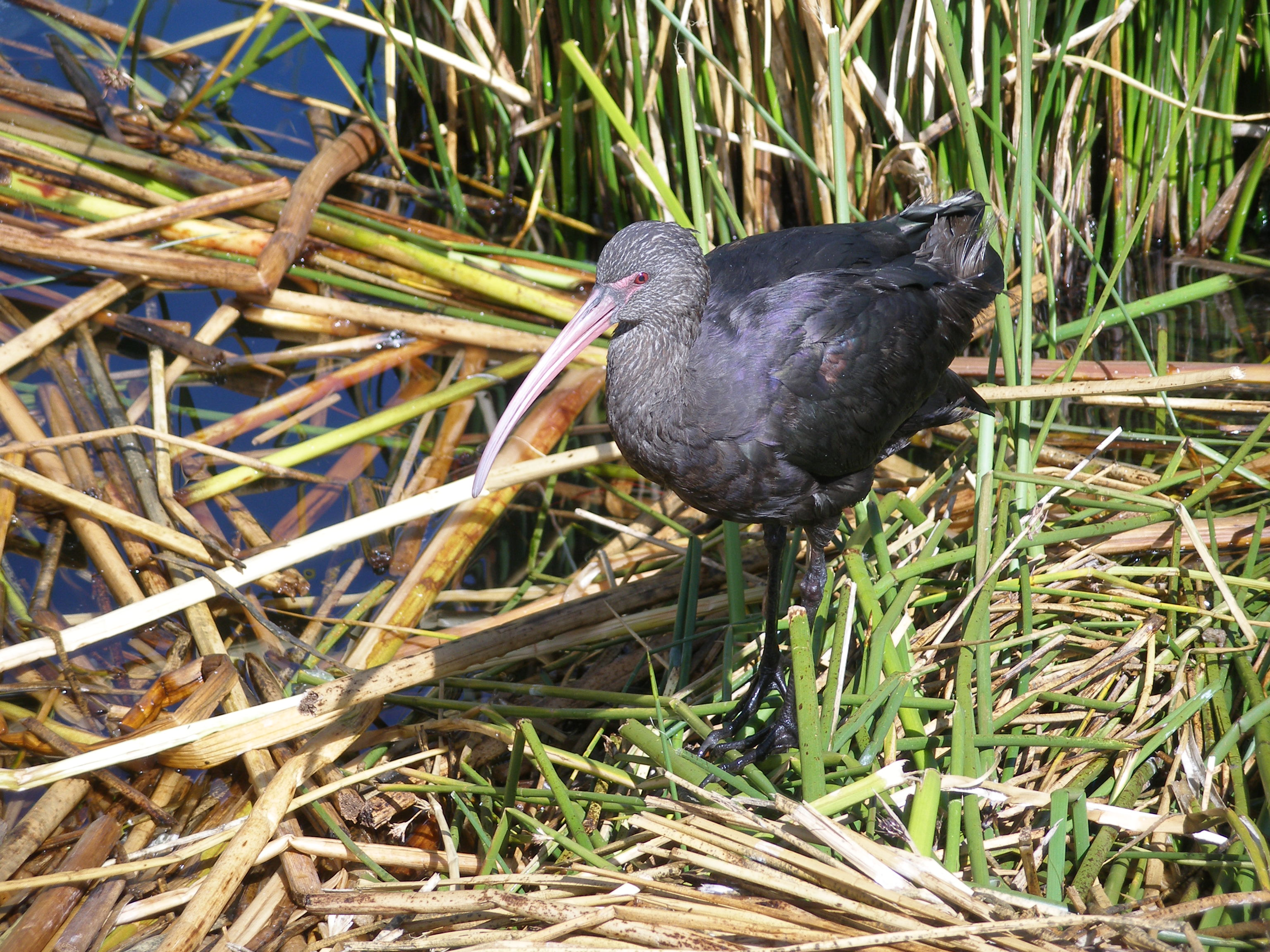
Puna ibis in its nest

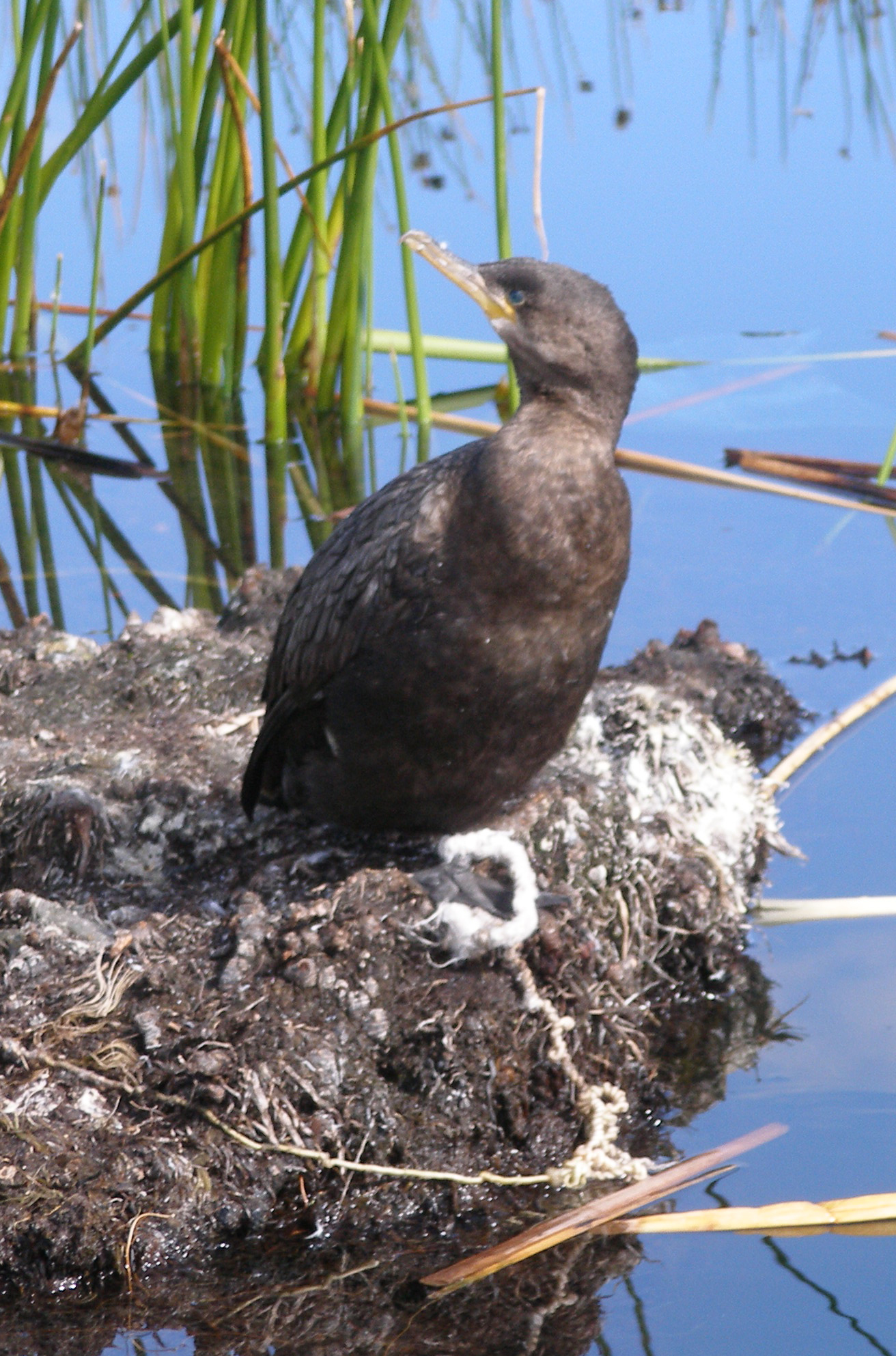
Tethered cormorant

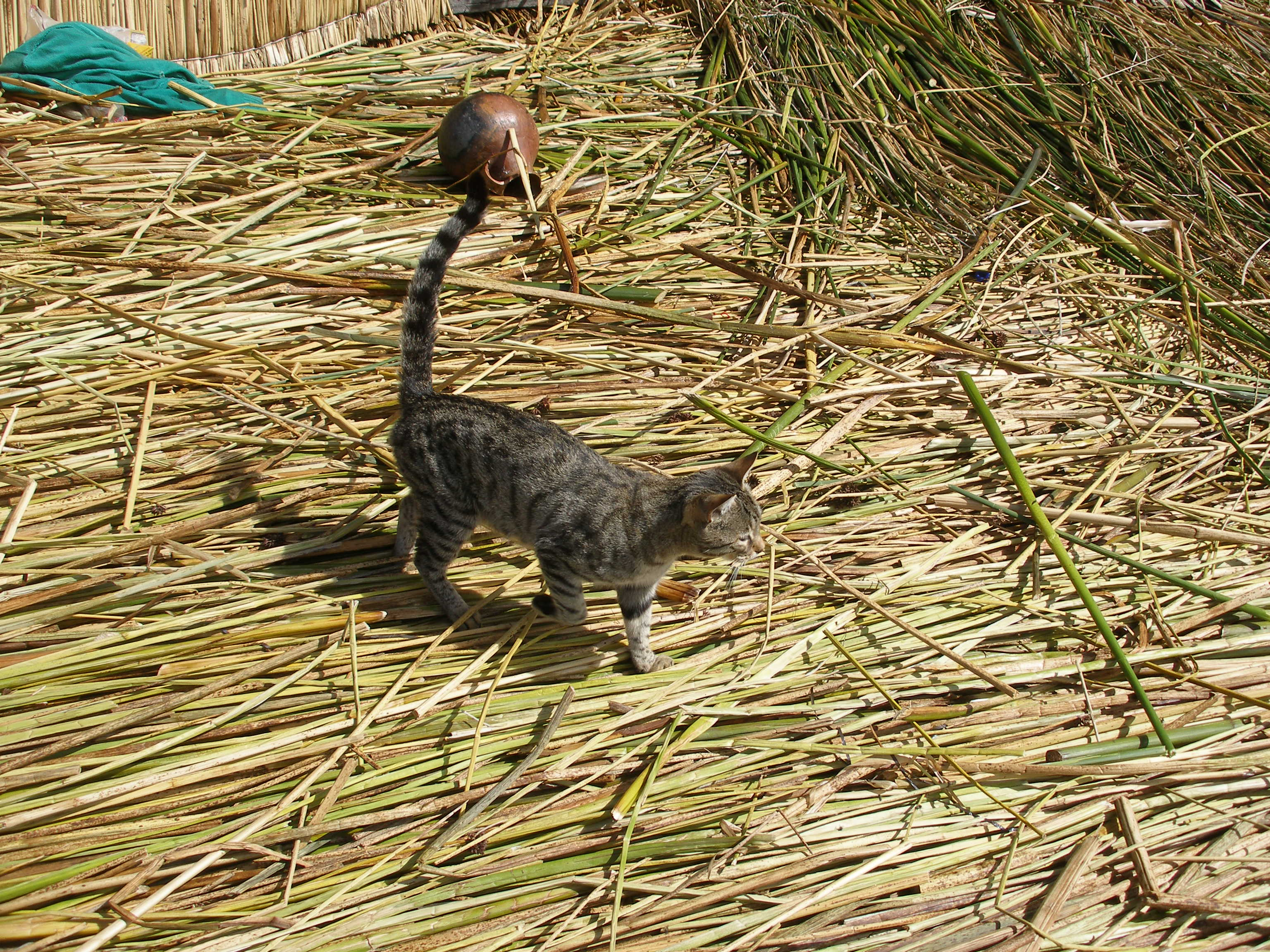
A cat kept for rat-catching

== Modern life ==
The Uru do not reject modern technology: most boats have motors, nearly all islands have shared solar panels to run appliances such as televisions, and the main island is home to an Uru-run FM radio station, which plays music for several hours a day. Septic tanks are widely used to manage human waste, and are regularly transported to the mainland and back for emptying. High ultraviolet radiation levels occur throughout the Altiplano region of Peru and Bolivia. Kindergarten and elementary schooling is available on several islands, including a traditional school and a school run by a Christian church. Older children and university students attend school on the mainland, often in nearby Puno. Historically, most of the Uru islands were located near the middle of the lake, about 9 miles from the shore; however, in 1986, after a major storm devastated the islands, many Uru rebuilt closer to shore.

As of 2011, about 1,200 Uru lived on an archipelago of 60 artificial islands, clustering in the western corner of the lake near the port town of Puno. The islands have become one of Peru's tourist attractions, allowing the Uru to supplement their hunting and fishing by conveying visitors to the islands by motorboat and selling handicrafts.

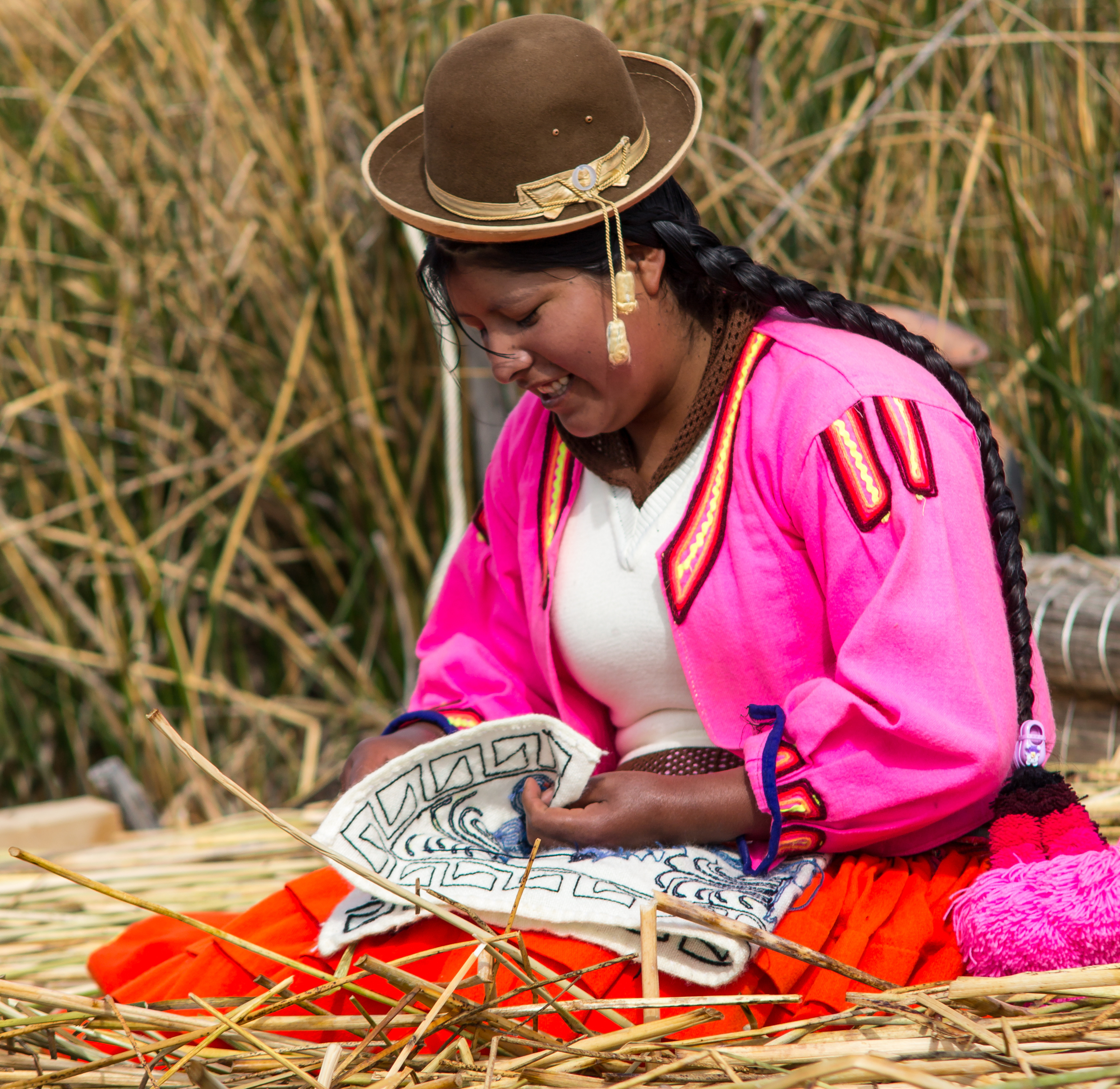
A Uro woman knitting.

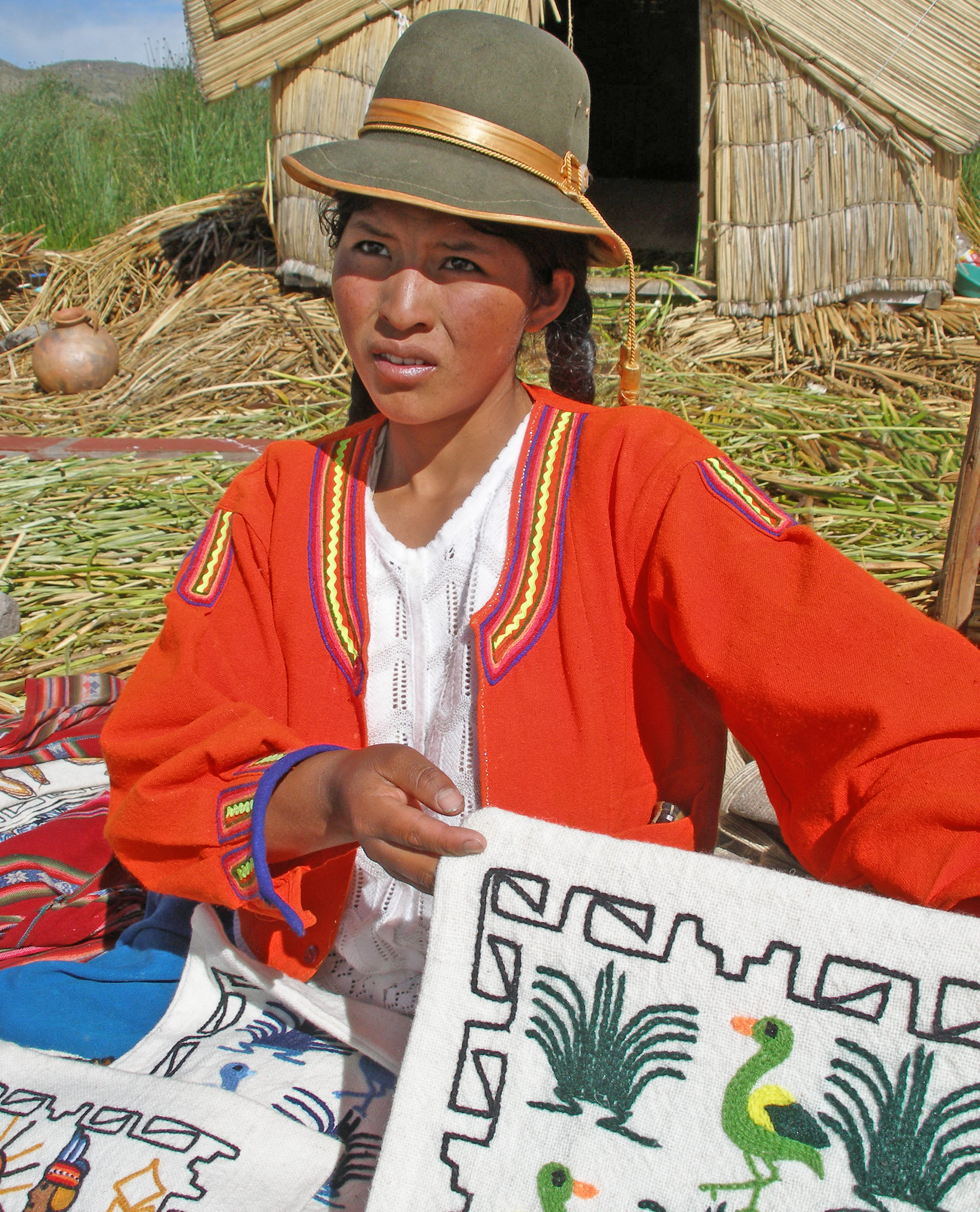
A Uro woman showing her crafts.

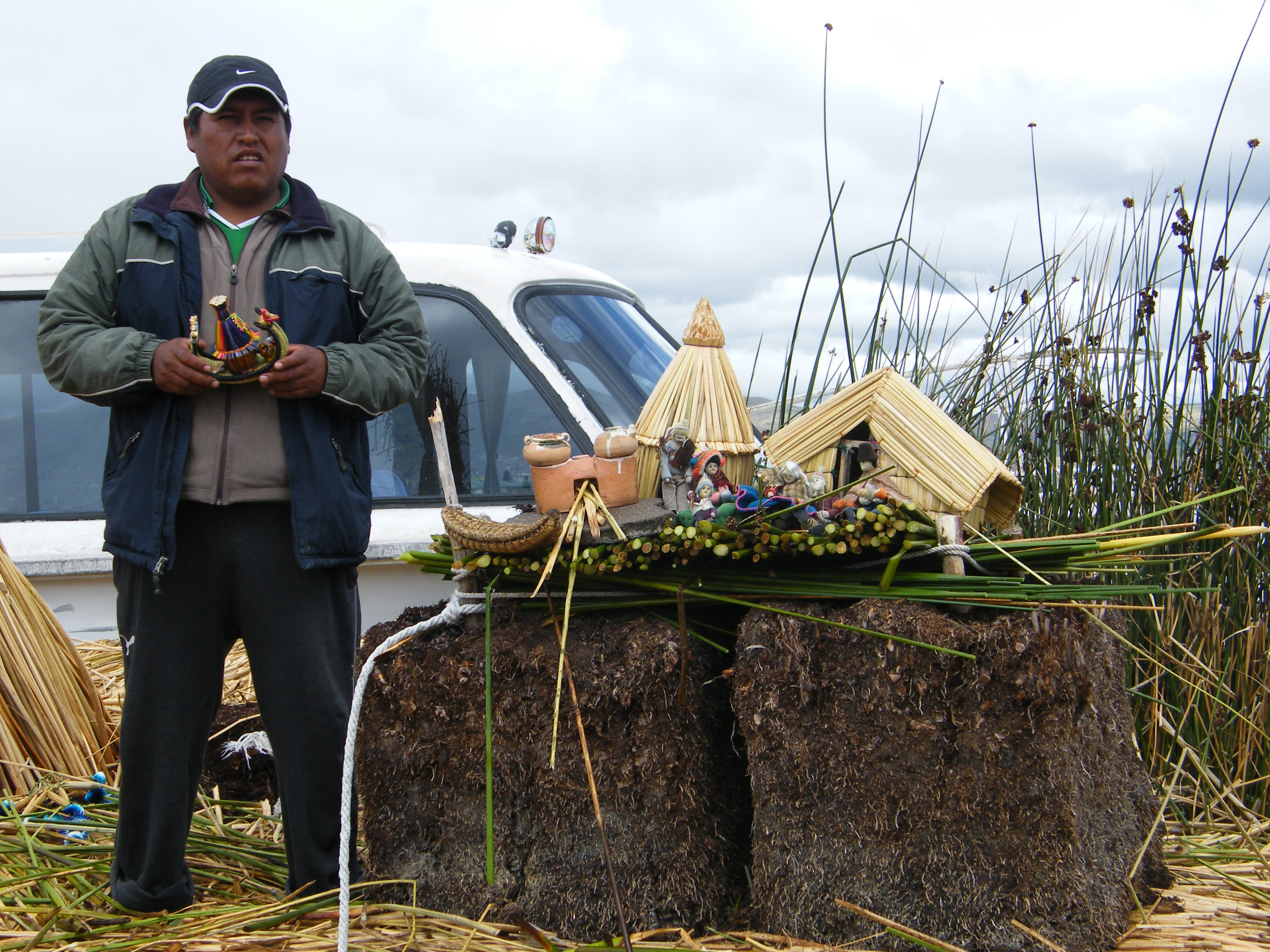
A Uro man showcasing his artisan work to tourists.

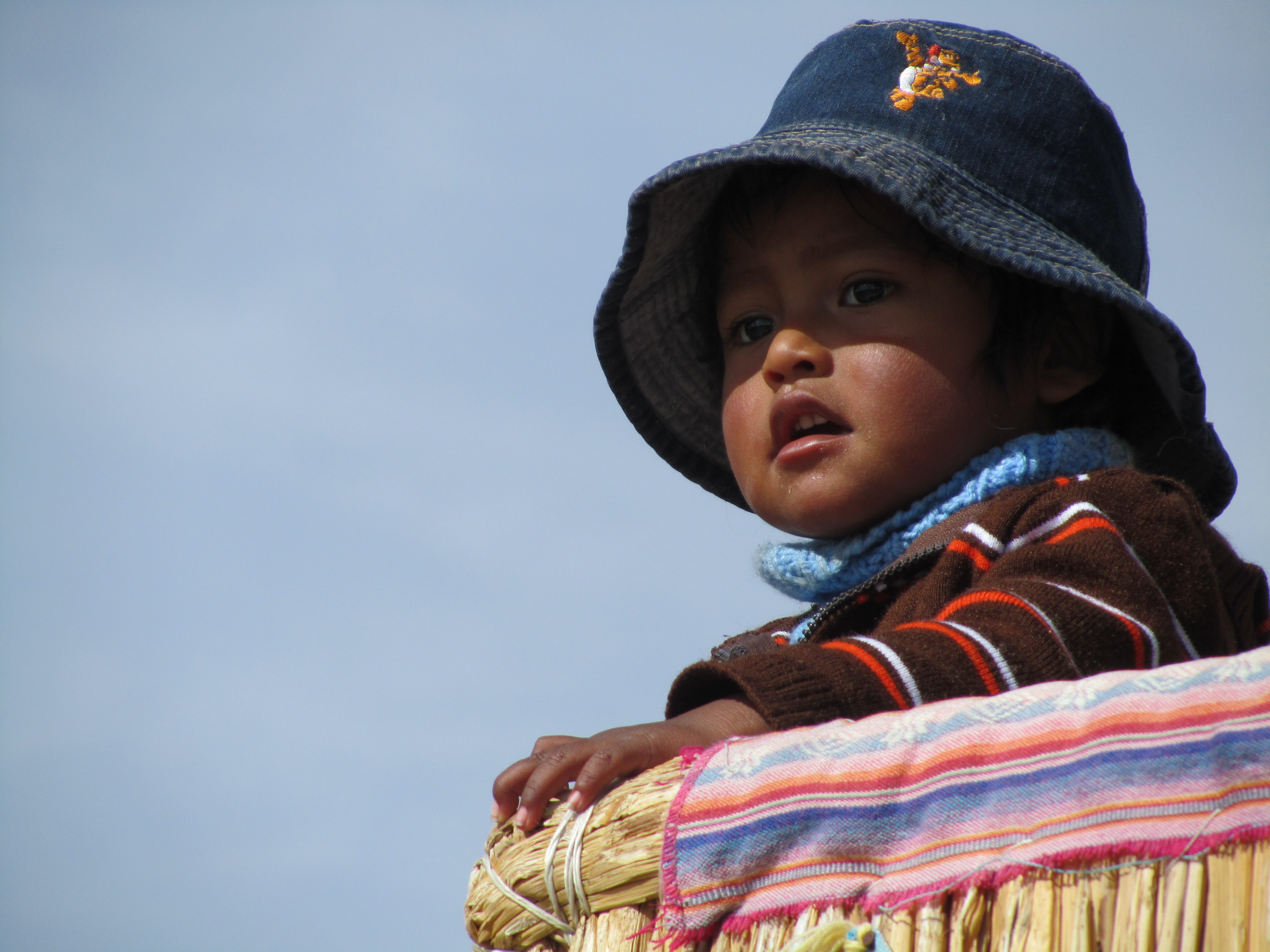
Uro kid on a Reed boat.

== See also ==
- Uru language
- Uru-Muratos
- List of fishing villages
- Floating island
