= Yunguyo =

Capital of Yunguyo Province, Puno Region, Peru

Yunguyo Yunkuyu
- Town
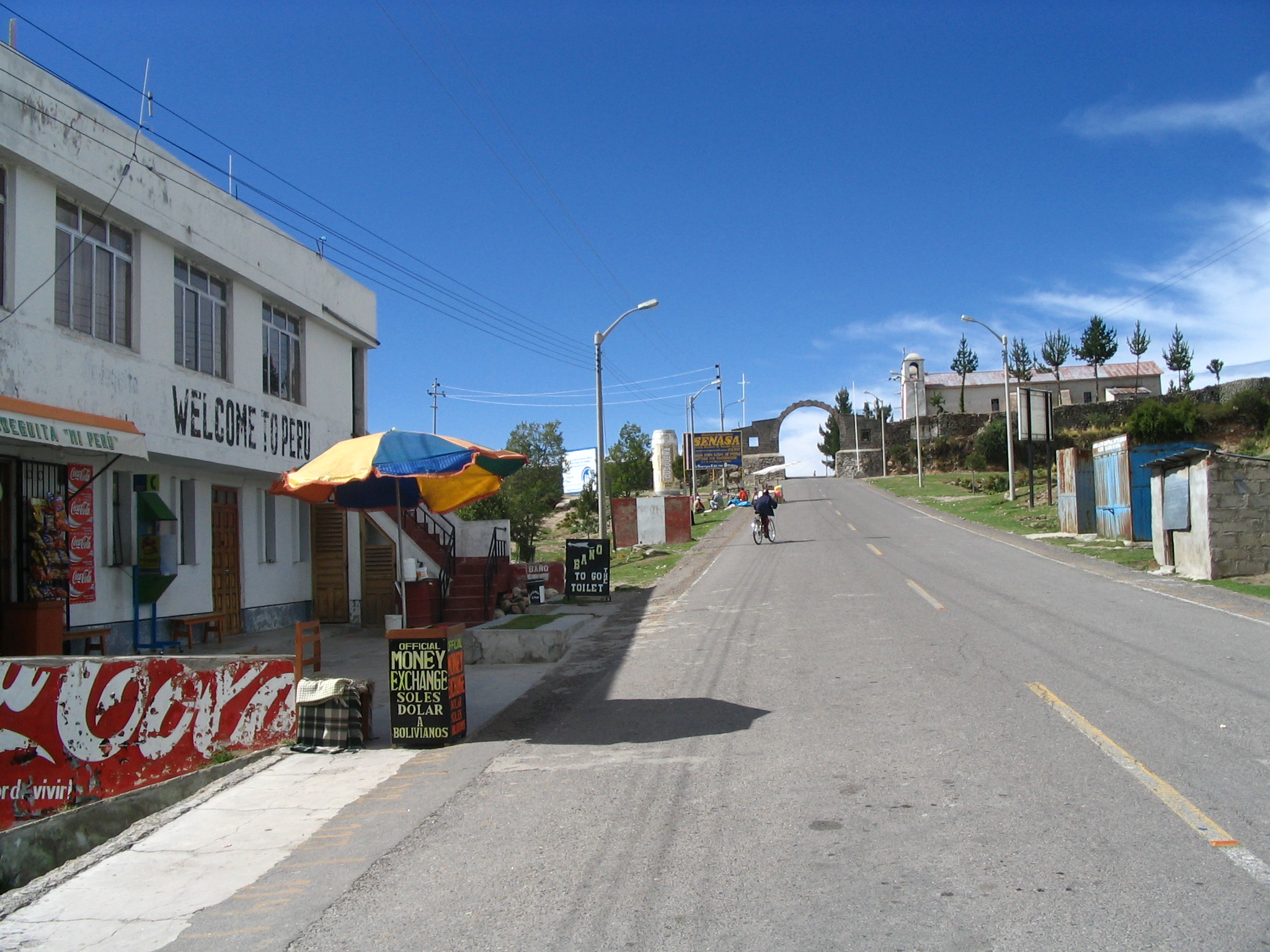
- Street in Yunguyo leading to the border crossing to Bolivia

- Location within Peru
- Coordinates: 16°14′39.06″S 69°05′33.95″W
- Country: Peru
- Region: Puno
- Province: Yunguyo

Population (2008)
  - Total: 12,625
- Time zone: UTC-5:00 (EST)

Yunguyo is a town in the Puno Region in southeastern Peru. It is the capital of Yunguyo Province and Yunguyo District. It has a population of 12,625 (2008 estimate).

Yunguyo is located on a peninsula on the shores of Lake Titicaca. The border with Bolivia runs next to the town and a road connects it with the town of Copacabana located a few kilometers away on the Bolivian side of the peninsula.

== Climate ==
Climate data for Tahuaco-Yunguyo, elevation 3,888 m (12,756 ft), (1991–2020)
Month	Jan	Feb	Mar	Apr	May	Jun	Jul	Aug	Sep	Oct	Nov	Dec	Year
Mean daily maximum °C (°F)	14.7 (58.5)	14.9 (58.8)	15.0 (59.0)	15.1 (59.2)	14.5 (58.1)	13.4 (56.1)	13.2 (55.8)	14.1 (57.4)	14.9 (58.8)	15.8 (60.4)	16.5 (61.7)	15.8 (60.4)	14.8 (58.7)
Mean daily minimum °C (°F)	4.0 (39.2)	3.9 (39.0)	3.7 (38.7)	2.2 (36.0)	−0.4 (31.3)	−2.0 (28.4)	−2.0 (28.4)	−0.8 (30.6)	1.0 (33.8)	2.2 (36.0)	3.2 (37.8)	3.9 (39.0)	1.6 (34.9)
Average precipitation mm (inches)	174.3 (6.86)	145.0 (5.71)	120.3 (4.74)	41.0 (1.61)	11.4 (0.45)	10.4 (0.41)	9.7 (0.38)	18.5 (0.73)	27.0 (1.06)	47.3 (1.86)	54.6 (2.15)	98.7 (3.89)	758.2 (29.85)
Source: National Meteorology and Hydrology Service of Peru
