= Uru-Murato =

Bolivian indigenous people

The Uru of Lake Poopó, commonly known as the Uru-Murato, are an indigenous peoples in Bolivia and one of three main Uru ethnic groups. They inhabit three hamlets along the shoreline of Lake Poopó: Llapallapani, Puñaca Tinta María, and Vilañeque.

In 1930, their lands and lake were invaded by the Aymara people. Consequently, most of the Uru-Muratos lost their place as the sole fishermen of the lake, and their economic livelihood and relations with other communities were drastically worsened.
