= Uru language =

Uru–Chipaya language spoken in Bolivia

Uru
- Uchumataqu, Kot-suñ
- Native to: Bolivia
- Region: Lake Titicaca, near the Desaguadero River
- Ethnicity: 230 Uru people (2007)
- Extinct: 2004, with the death of Julia Vila
- Language family: Uru–Chipaya: Uru
- Dialects: Uru of Ch'imu; Uru of Isla del Sol

Language codes
- ISO 639-3: ure
- Glottolog: uruu1244
- ELP: Uru
- Linguasphere: 84-MAA-aa
- Map of Uru-Chipaya languages

- Uru is classified as Extinct be the UNESCO Atlas of the World's Languages in Danger.

The Uru language, also known as Uchumataqu (Uru: Kot-suñ), is an extinct language formerly spoken by the Uru people. In 2004, it had 2 remaining native speakers out of an ethnic group of 140 people in the La Paz Department, Bolivia near Lake Titicaca, the rest having shifted to Aymara and Spanish.

Uru is also called Ochosuma (Uchuzuma), a historical name for the Uru ethnic group.

By 2012 the language had no speakers left. However, the Uru community has been interested in revitalizing their language and maintaining their culture.

== Identification ==
Since one of the Urus' names for their language was "Pukina", Uchumataqu has previously been mistakenly identified with Puquina. While the personal and possessive pronouns of the unrelated Puquina bear limited similarities to those of Arawakan languages, Uru differs drastically from Arawakan languages in its person-marking system and its morphology. The pronoun system of Uchumataqu is naturally very similar instead to its close relative Chipaya. Uchumataqu has also borrowed grammatical and lexical morphemes from prolonged exposure to Aymara, with which it is not related, however. Unlike Aymara, Uru is not polysynthetic and has a phonemic five-vowel system /a e i o u/, while Aymara has a three-vowel system /a i u/. One contrast between Uru and the related Chipaya is that Uru does not identify gender morphologically as Chipaya does.

== Dialects ==
There are mentions of two Uru dialects: Uru of Ch'imu and Sun Island, though it is unclear whether the former was a dialect or its own language. Uru of Ch'imu was spoken in the town of Ch'imu and was first recorded in 1929, and, while not published, there are detailed notes of the language in existence. The second variety was spoken on Isla del Sol in Lake Titicaca and was first described in the 1960s though there it is far less documented.

== Phonology ==
=== Consonants ===
		Labial	Alveolar		Palatal	Velar		Uvular	Glottal
		Labial	plain	lab.	Palatal	plain	lab.	Uvular	Glottal
Plosive	voiceless	p	t	tʷ		k	kʷ	q	
Plosive	aspirated	pʰ	tʰ			kʰ		qʰ	
Plosive	ejective	pʼ	tʼ			kʼ		qʼ	
Affricate	voiceless		t͡s		t͡ʃ	t͡k			
Affricate	ejective		t͡sʼ		t͡ʃʼ				
Fricative			s			x			h
Nasal		m	n		ɲ				
Trill			r						
Approximant	lateral		l		ʎ				
Approximant	central				j		w		

=== Vowels ===
	Front		Back	
	short	long	short	long
Close	i	iː	u	uː
Mid	e	eː	o	oː
Open	a	aː		

== Orthography ==
Uru did not have a standardized orthography.

== Sample texts ==
naː-nak-ki {maxnʸ a-l} tʰax-a-ki-č̣a
that.FEM-PL-TOP early-FEM sleep-FUT-FUT.NSP-DECL
They (those women) slept early

Wer-ki laŋ-ş-xapa tʰon-čin-č̣a
INV-TOP work-INF-BEN come-PST.1-DECL
I have come in order to work

Wir-il xála k'áyǎ pẹ́k'u-čay
INV-1 llama buy want-PRS.1.SG-DECL
I want to buy a llama
