= Juliaca =

City in Peru

Juliaca Hullaqa (Aymara)
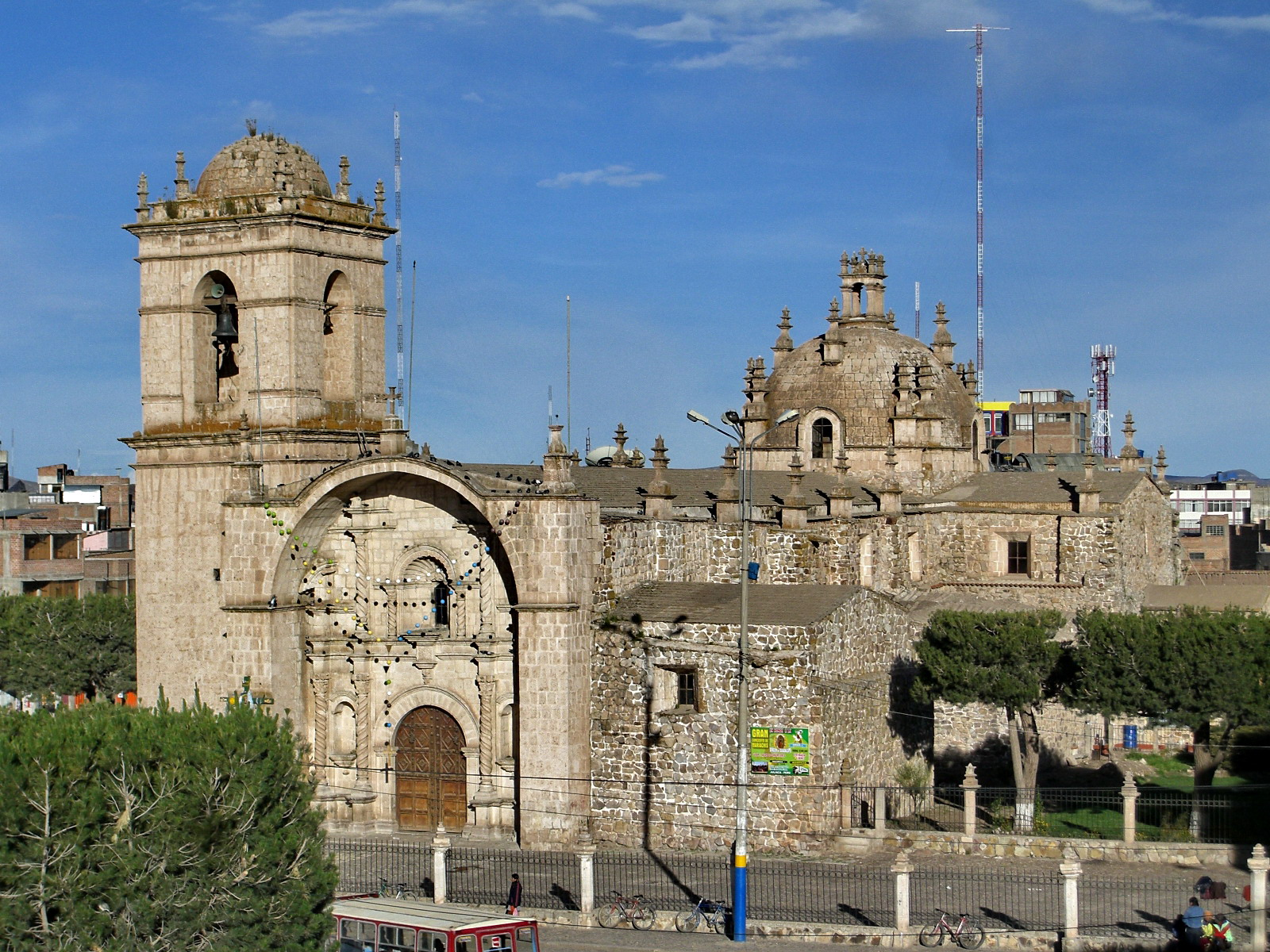
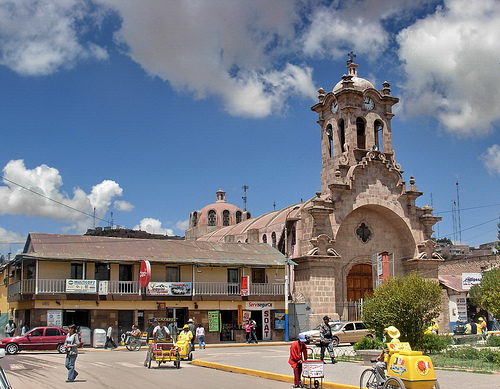
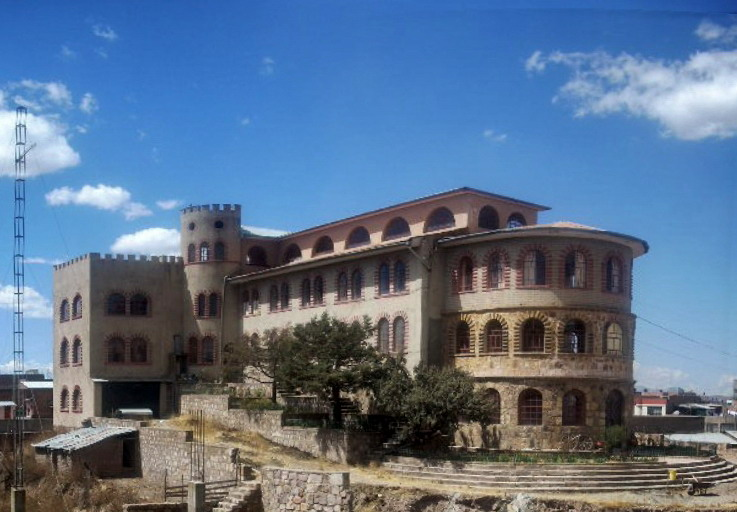
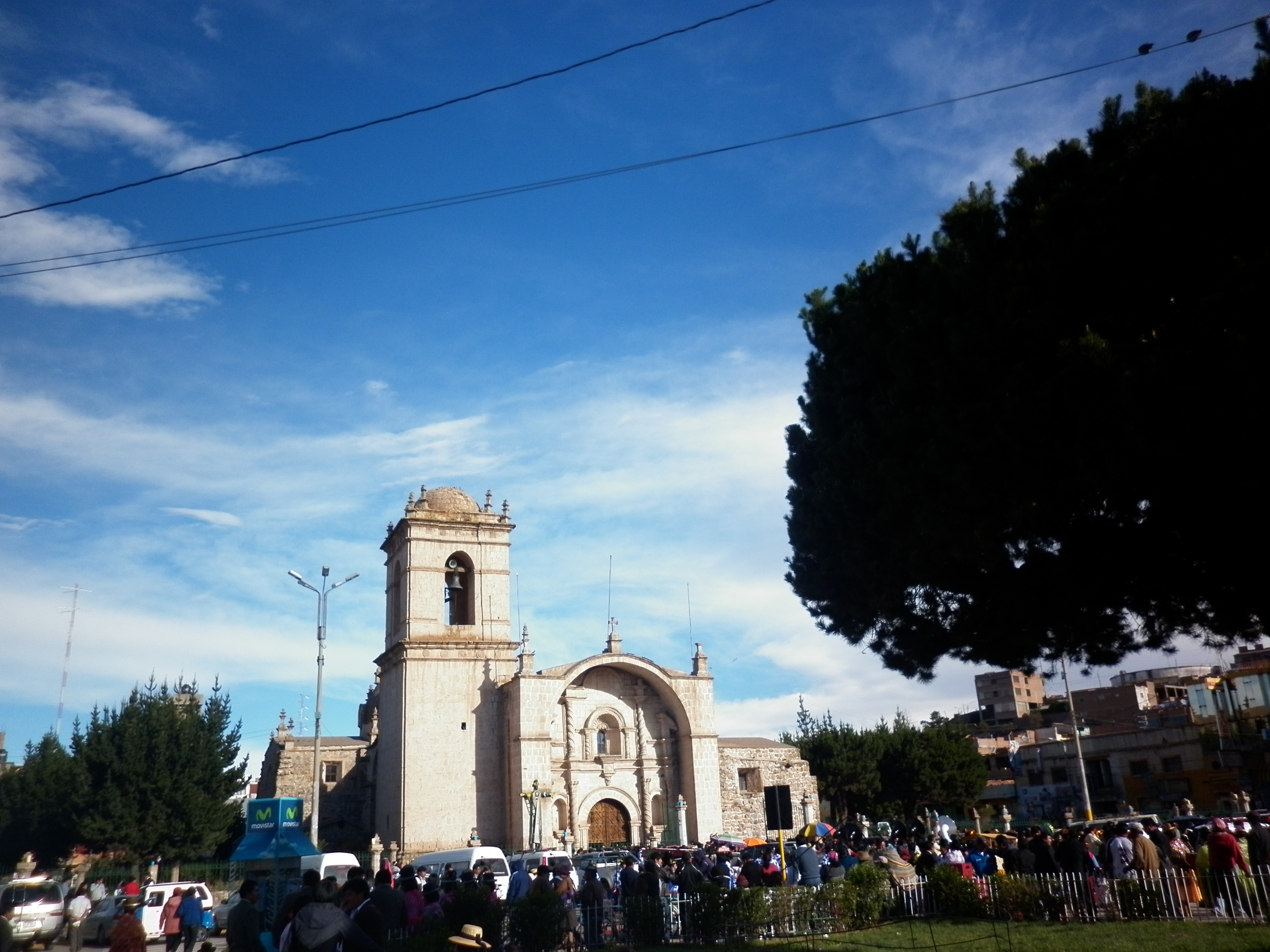
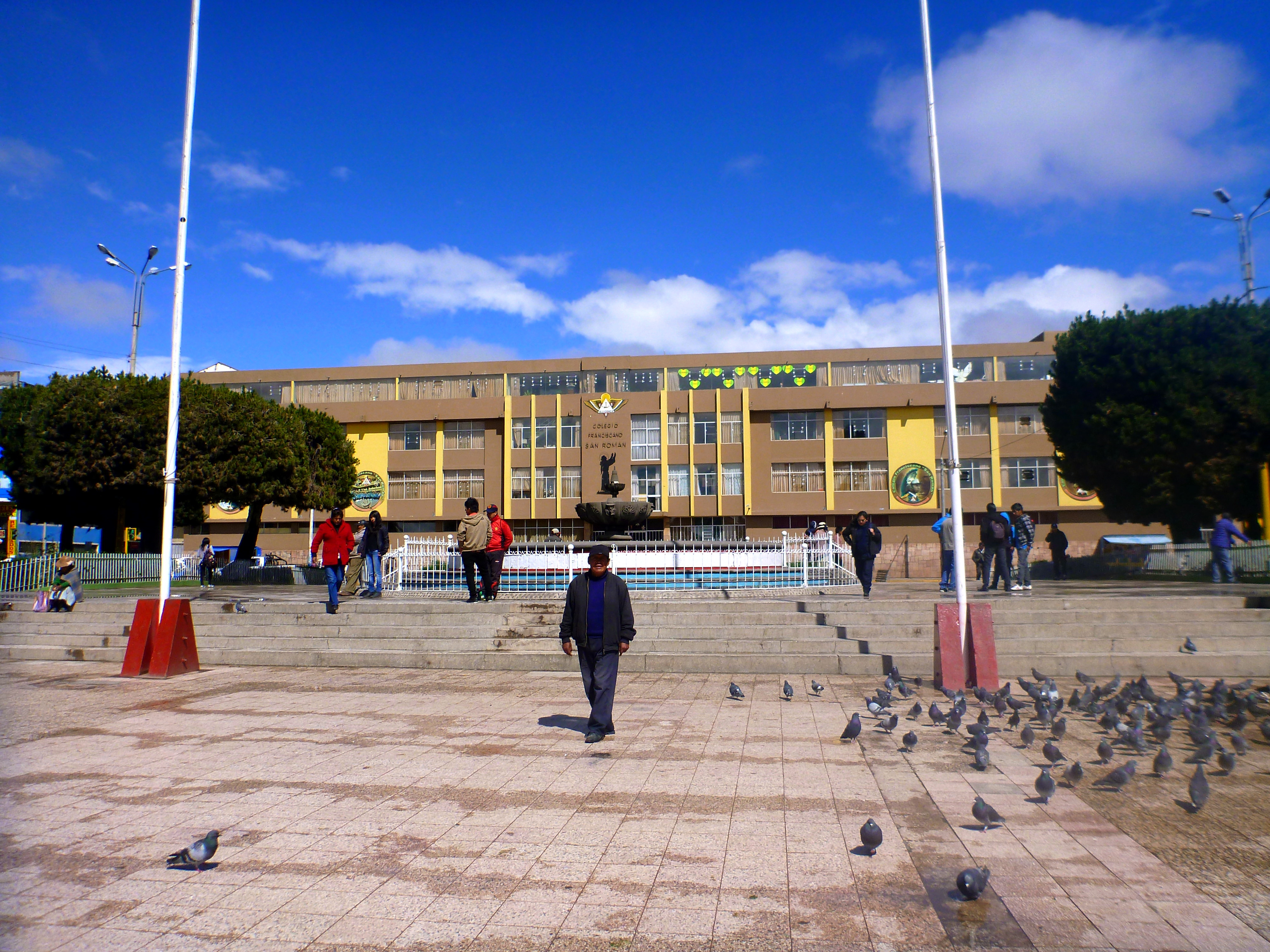
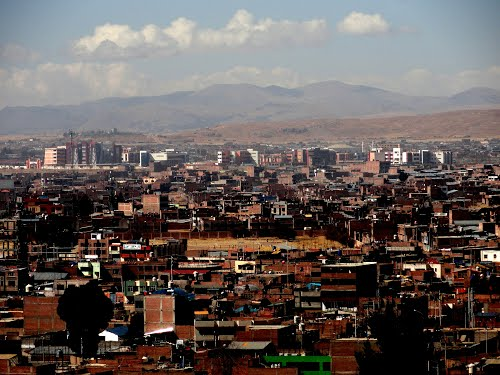

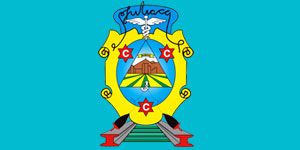
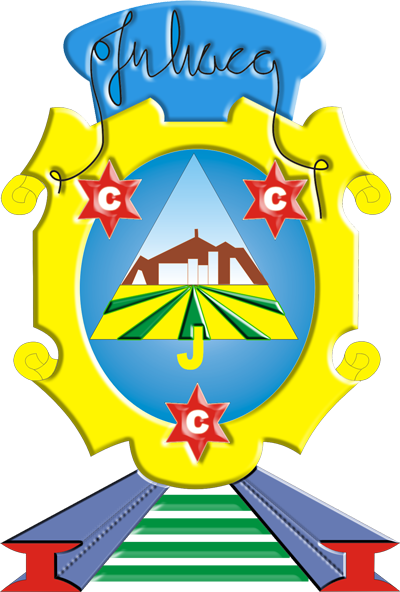
- Flag Coat of arms
- Nickname: Ciudad de los Vientos (City of Winds)
- Location within Peru
- Coordinates: 15°29′S 70°08′W
- Country: Peru
- Region: Puno
- Province: San Román
- District: Juliaca
- Founded: 1630
- Incorporated: 3 October 1908

Government
  - Type: Democracy
  - Mayor: David Sucacahua (2019–2022)

Area
  - City: 533.47 km^{2} (205.97 sq mi)
- Elevation: 3,825 m (12,549 ft)

Population (2017)
  - City: 276,110
  - Estimate (2026): 346,068
  - Rank: 12th in Peru; 11th (Agglomeration); 12th (Metro)
  - Density: 517.57/km^{2} (1,340.5/sq mi)
  - Urban: 308,547
  - Metro: 312,000
- Time zone: UTC-5 (PET)
  - Summer (DST): UTC-5 (PET)
- Area code: +51
- Website: Official Website

Juliaca (Spanish: [xuˈljaka]; Quechua and Aymara: Hullaqa) is the capital of San Román Province in the Puno Region of southeastern Peru. It is the region's largest city, with a population of 276,110 inhabitants (2017). On the Altiplano, Juliaca is 3,825 metres (12,549 ft) above sea level, is located on the Collao Plateau and is northwest of Lake Titicaca (45 km), near Chachas Lake, the Maravillas river, and near the ruins of Sillustani. It is the largest trade center in the Puno region.

The city hosts Carnaval Juliaca each year between February and March. During this very popular event participants, dressed in colorful costumes, gather on the streets to dance in the style of the Collao Plateau. Saint Sebastian's feast is celebrated on 20 January of every year.

Like Chicago, Illinois, it is nicknamed "The Windy City", in its case, because of the city's location on the windy Collao Plateau. It is also called the "Sock City" or "Knitting City" because Juliaca was a major center of sock, sweater, and handicraft production. Now the production of clothes, wool and fabrics are industrial processes.

== Etymology ==
The historian Ramon Rios argues that Juliaca comes from the Quechua words Xullaskca kaipi (it had drizzled) in allusion that when the Inca troops arrived at this part of the Altiplano chasing the collas, they noticed that in the Huaynarroque hill it had drizzled.

However, Justo Ruelas affirms that Juliaca comes from the Quechua word Shulla Qaqa (roquedal dew), due to the fact that in the vicinity of the Huaynarroque and Santa Cruz hills, small quartz particles can be seen, which resembles the morning dew that falls on rocks.

== History ==
=== Pre-Spanish arrival ===
The Altiplano was inhabited from around 4,000 BC by sedentary communities dedicated to agriculture and livestock (llamas and guinea pigs).

The Uros settled in the river towns, taking advantage of the benefits of the totora and the fish of Lake Titicaca, settled in the surrounding lakes: Chacas, Qoriwata, Cochapampa, and the Juliaca River, today Coata River.

"The Indians who are called Uros...live on the banks where they fish, with which they support themselves...they are strong Indians and of good disposition and there are many who are in the lakes without making sementeras or clothes, eating from roots that they call totora."

— Garcí Diez, Crónicas en América,

The constitution of these settlers were registered as Uros de Coata and Uros de Desaguadero, from where the Uros of Coata would be better communicated and related to Juliaca, by the river that linked them, also these riverine settlers developed a sailing technique, on rafts made of totora, fastened with yarned ropes based on the ichus, which would serve as support for fishing, and at times, of transport from Lake Titicaca to the smaller lakes that were between the territories of Juliaca.

"As a testimony of the ancient presence of the Uros, in the balsero partiality, and later in the rafts of Juliaca, there have been some names of places: Totoral, Torococha..."

— René Calsín Anco, Bodas de diamante de la provincia de San Román,

Between the years 1000 to 500 BC, Juliaca flourished under the influence of Qaluyo (ancient settlement), in the place of Qomer Moqo (Taparachi). Archaeologists discovered a small village dating back to this time, whose settlers were fed with potatoes, quinoa, kañiwa, carachi, guinea pig, among others. They were the first builders of waruwarus and developed a special textile industry.

In the years 200 BC to 200 AD, the domain of the Pukara culture expanded in this region of the highlands. Between the third and fourth centuries, the Huaynarroque tribe flourished. Subsequently, the hegemony of Tiahuanaco, Colla and Inka arises consecutively. The kollas and Inka were ruthless rivals and only under the military command of Pachacútec and his son Mayta Capac were able to subdue the brave Sapana, Chuchicápac and Huaynarroque tribes after bloody wars of conquest.

=== Viceroyalty ===
During the viceregal period, Juliaca was a Repartimiento. An important document is the one that organizes the Corregimiento del Collao (later the Corregimiento of Lampa or Cabana) and dates from June 23, 1565, signed by Lope García de Castro. There, Juliaca is recorded as a Repartimiento entrusted to Don Diego Hernández.

There is information about certain historical books found in the parish archive of the Santa Catalina Mother Church that testifies to the Spanish foundation of Juliaca, whose name was: Pueblo de Santa Catalina de Juliaca

During the events of Laykakota, which shook the stability of the Viceroyalty and led to the arrival of the Viceroy Count of Lemos in 1668, Juliaca was the headquarters of the rebels, the Salcedo brothers. Also during the liberation struggle of Túpac Amaru II, it is worth mentioning Colonel Juan Cahuapaza, who as chief of Juliaca fought in the Rebellion of Túpac Amaru II.

=== Republican era ===
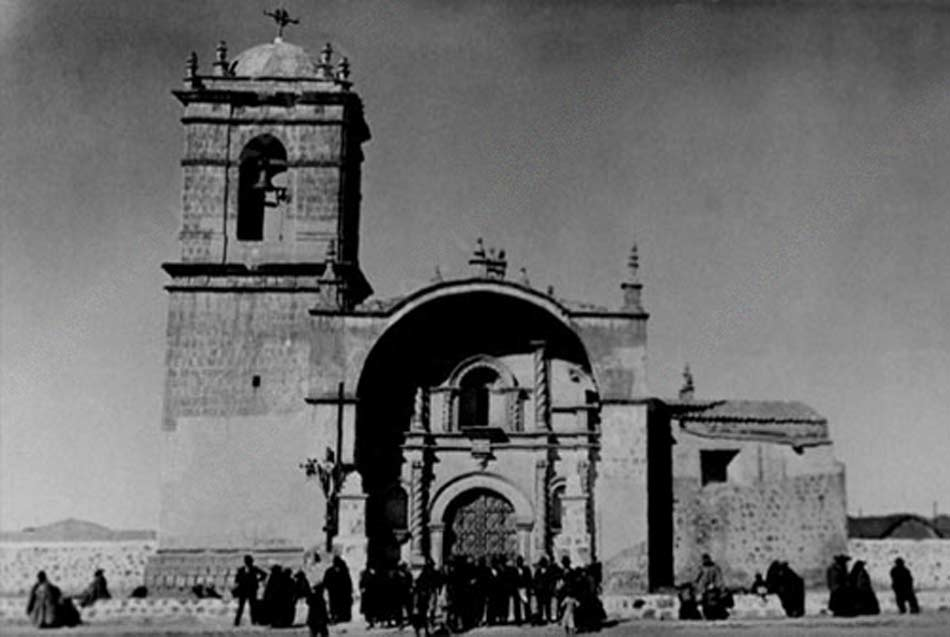
Iglesia Santa Catalina in 1940

At the beginning of the republican period, Juliaca had a rural layout, until the railway station was installed in 1873, which revolutionized the economic and social panorama of the Altiplano, with the presence not only of technology, but of visionary people from Europe, and other cities of Peru.

At the end of the 19th century, Juliaca had a more urban profile. Thus, its citizens focused on elevating Juliaca to a higher category; urban, social and economic growth justified it.

=== 21st century ===
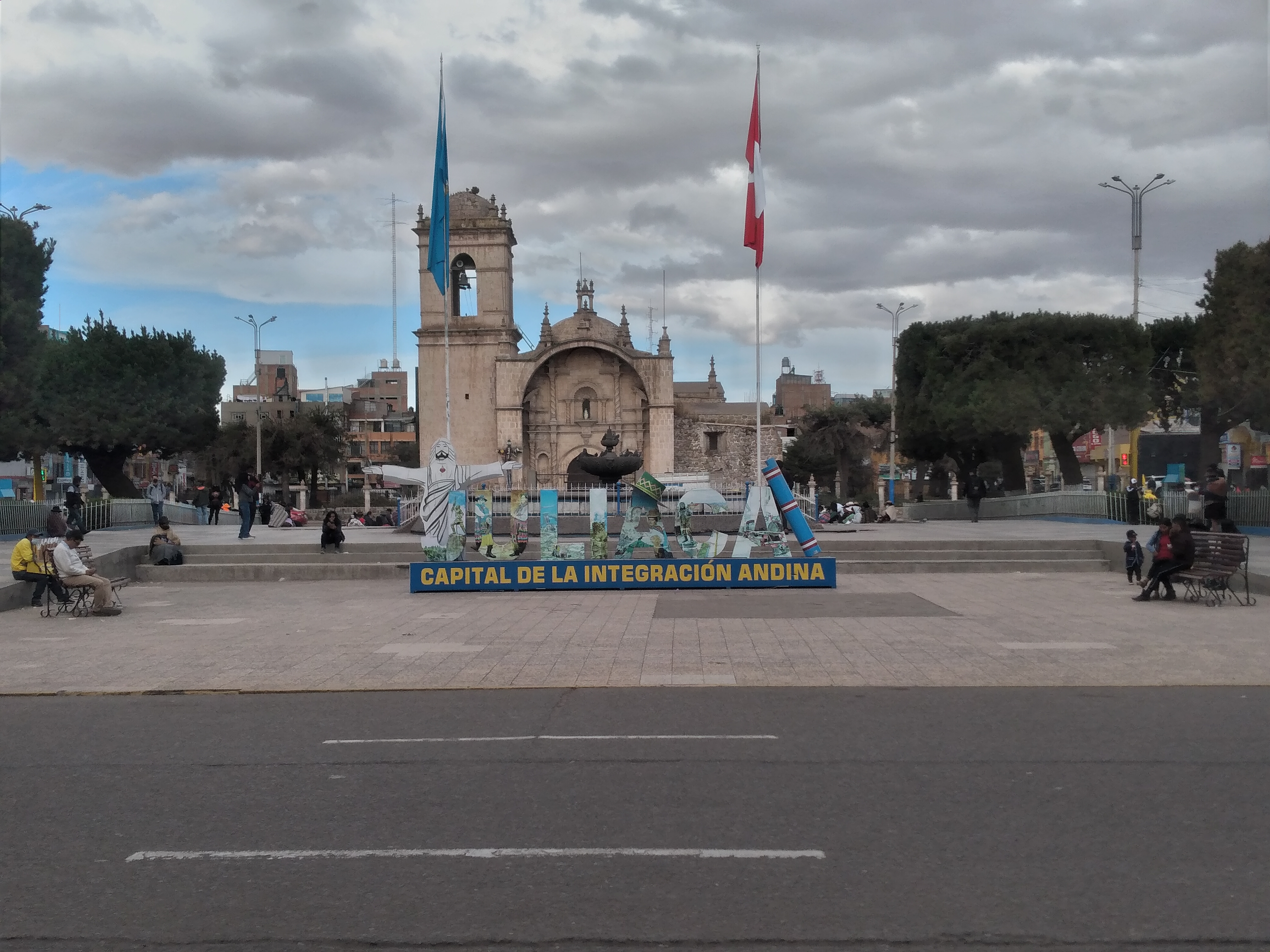
Plaza de Armas de Juliaca

Within the framework of the Peruvian protests (2022–2023) in the country against the Government of Dina Boluarte and on the sixth day of an indefinite strike, there is a fierce police repression against the protesters that left at least 17 dead and 73 injured according to reports from the MINSA. Most of the deaths occur in the vicinity of the Inca Manco Capac Airport, a place that has become a main point and objective during the last days of the strike. Two days later, there is a massive deployment of the Juliaqueña population carrying the coffins of the fallen on their shoulders while the population declares 3 days of mourning by raising black flags or at half-mast in their homes. This event has been known as the Juliaca massacre.

== Geography ==
=== Location ===
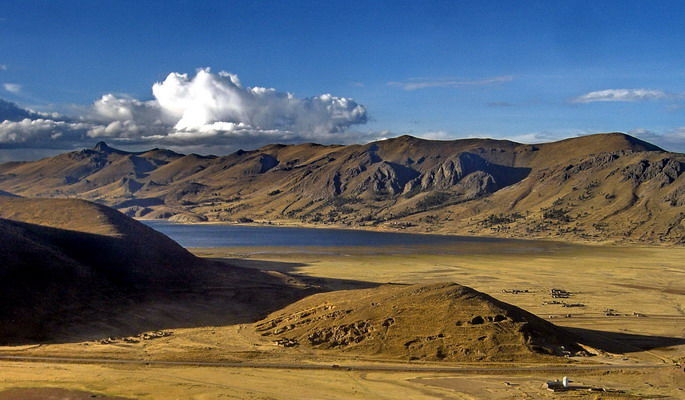
Chacas Lagoon

The city of Juliaca is located in the northern part of the San Román province and on the northwest side of Lake Titicaca and 35 km from it. The geographical area of the Juliaca district occupies the central part of the department of Puno and the Collao plateau. Due to its geoeconomic importance, in 1926 Juliaca was integrated into the Province of San Román as its capital. Juliaca's citizens rely on cars, trains, and bicycles. It is a major transit point in the region and has strong ties with Peru's southern cities, including Arequipa, Puno, Tacna, Cuzco, Ilo, and with La Rinconada and Bolivia.

=== Climate ===
Juliaca features a subtropical highland climate (Köppen: Cwb, Trewartha: Cwlk), with cool to cold temperatures most of the year. The average annual precipitation is 610 millimetres or 24 inches. Winters are dry with freezing nights and mornings, and pleasant afternoon temperatures.

Climate data for Juliaca, elevation 3,838 m (12,592 ft), (1991–2020 normals, extremes 1961–present)
Month	Jan	Feb	Mar	Apr	May	Jun	Jul	Aug	Sep	Oct	Nov	Dec	Year
Record high °C (°F)	30.4 (86.7)	26.0 (78.8)	23.8 (74.8)	27.0 (80.6)	23.0 (73.4)	21.8 (71.2)	21.5 (70.7)	22.1 (71.8)	24.0 (75.2)	24.0 (75.2)	25.5 (77.9)	27.2 (81.0)	30.4 (86.7)
Mean daily maximum °C (°F)	17.2 (63.0)	16.9 (62.4)	17.3 (63.1)	17.7 (63.9)	17.6 (63.7)	17.1 (62.8)	16.8 (62.2)	17.8 (64.0)	18.6 (65.5)	19.1 (66.4)	19.9 (67.8)	18.6 (65.5)	17.9 (64.2)
Daily mean °C (°F)	10.9 (51.6)	10.9 (51.6)	10.6 (51.1)	9.5 (49.1)	7.1 (44.8)	5.3 (41.5)	4.9 (40.8)	6.1 (43.0)	8.2 (46.8)	9.7 (49.5)	10.8 (51.4)	11.1 (52.0)	8.8 (47.8)
Mean daily minimum °C (°F)	4.5 (40.1)	4.8 (40.6)	3.8 (38.8)	1.2 (34.2)	−3.5 (25.7)	−6.5 (20.3)	−7.0 (19.4)	−5.7 (21.7)	−2.3 (27.9)	0.3 (32.5)	1.6 (34.9)	3.5 (38.3)	−0.4 (31.2)
Record low °C (°F)	−4.8 (23.4)	−3.0 (26.6)	−5.0 (23.0)	−7.2 (19.0)	−12.4 (9.7)	−12.0 (10.4)	−12.2 (10.0)	−12.0 (10.4)	−7.8 (18.0)	−5.6 (21.9)	−6.0 (21.2)	−5.2 (22.6)	−12.4 (9.7)
Average precipitation mm (inches)	126.3 (4.97)	119.0 (4.69)	95.8 (3.77)	39.5 (1.56)	6.1 (0.24)	2.3 (0.09)	5.0 (0.20)	5.2 (0.20)	21.8 (0.86)	51.1 (2.01)	42.3 (1.67)	104.7 (4.12)	619.1 (24.38)
Source 1: National Meteorology and Hydrology Service of Peru
Source 2: Meteo Climat (record highs and lows)

== Economy ==
Juliaca is a large trade center for goods and services, and is considered the financial capital of the Puno region. Trade is its principal economic activity, comprising 26.5% of the Labor force. In 2008, Juliaca had 15,439 commercial establishments, which amounts to 41% of trade done in the Puno region. It is the commercial hub for the La Rinconada high-altitude city of informal gold mining.

The city of Juliaca has become a center of capital investment. As a result, poverty has been reduced, and increased per capita income has come to some of its residents.

== Monuments and places of interest ==
The city of Juliaca and its surroundings have various natural and historical tourist attractions, among the most outstanding are the Santa Catalina church, Waynaruqi hill, Chacas lagoon and the Kokan community.

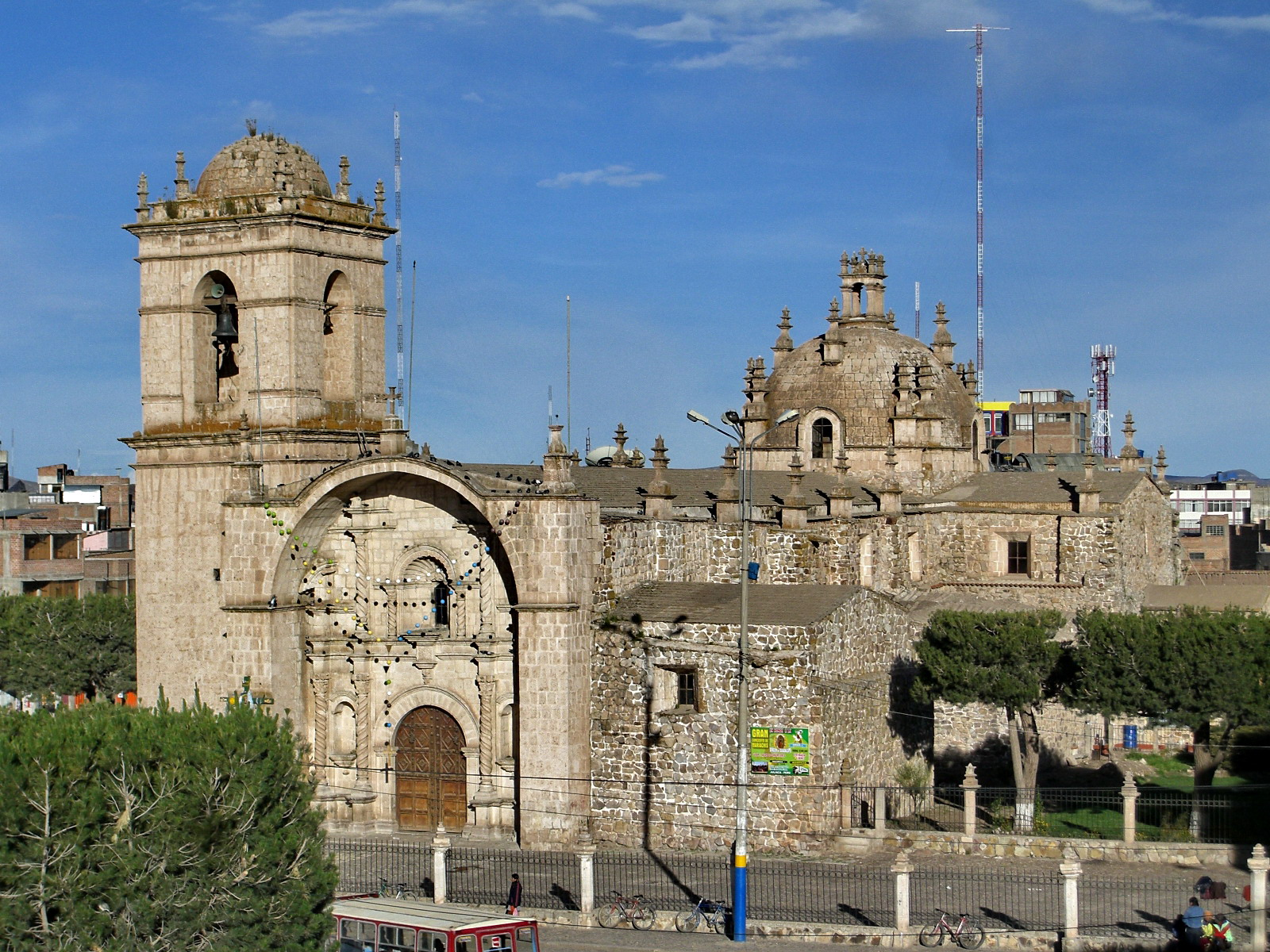
Santa Catalina Church

=== Santa Catalina Church ===
Located in the Plaza de Armas, it has an indigenous baroque architectural style. The start of its construction dates back to 1649, started by the Jesuits; however it was not completed until 125 years later. Proof of this is its only bell tower, built entirely with ashlar brought from the quarries of Arequipa. It is currently under the command of the Franciscan Order.

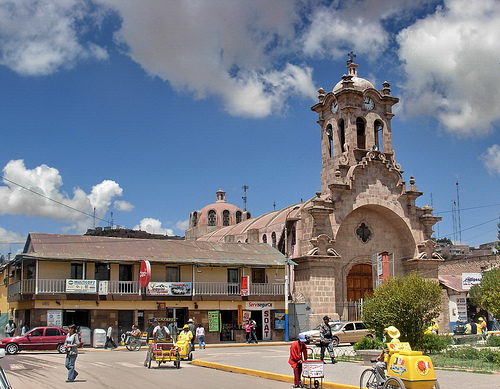
Merced Church

=== La Merced Church ===
La Merced church is located in the west wing of the Plaza Bolognesi in the city center. Carved out of red limestone (due to its characteristic color) and with a structure typical of the modern era (iron frame). Like the main Church of Santa Catalina, it only has a bell tower arranged symmetrically unlike the previous one, and it also features a clock with four circular faces. Its construction is due to a group of faithful devotees who commissioned the construction from Don Gregorio Layme. It was inaugurated in 1959 and renovated in 1995, where they included indigenous elements.

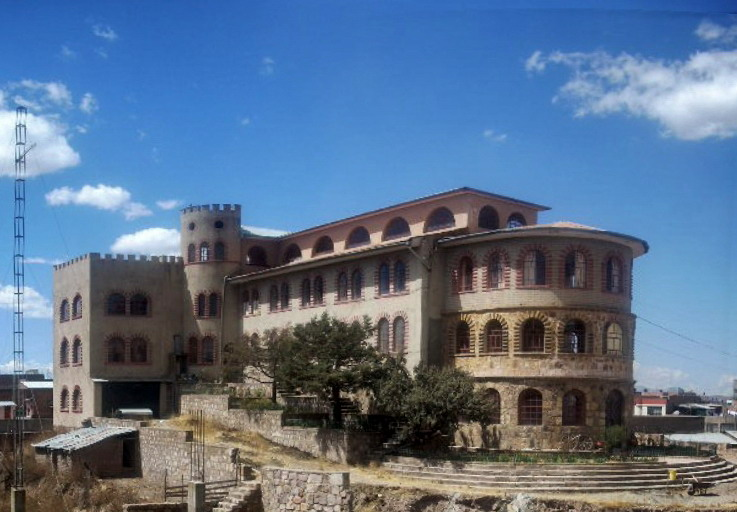
Franciscan Convent

=== Franciscan Convent ===
Also called Convent of Santa Bárbara , it is a four-level building built on the hill Hatun Rumi or Santa Bárbara (Spanish name), 40 m from the Plaza de Armas de Juliaca, it presents a style essentially Romanesque. Due to its importance during the republican era, today it constitutes one of the main tourist attractions of the city.

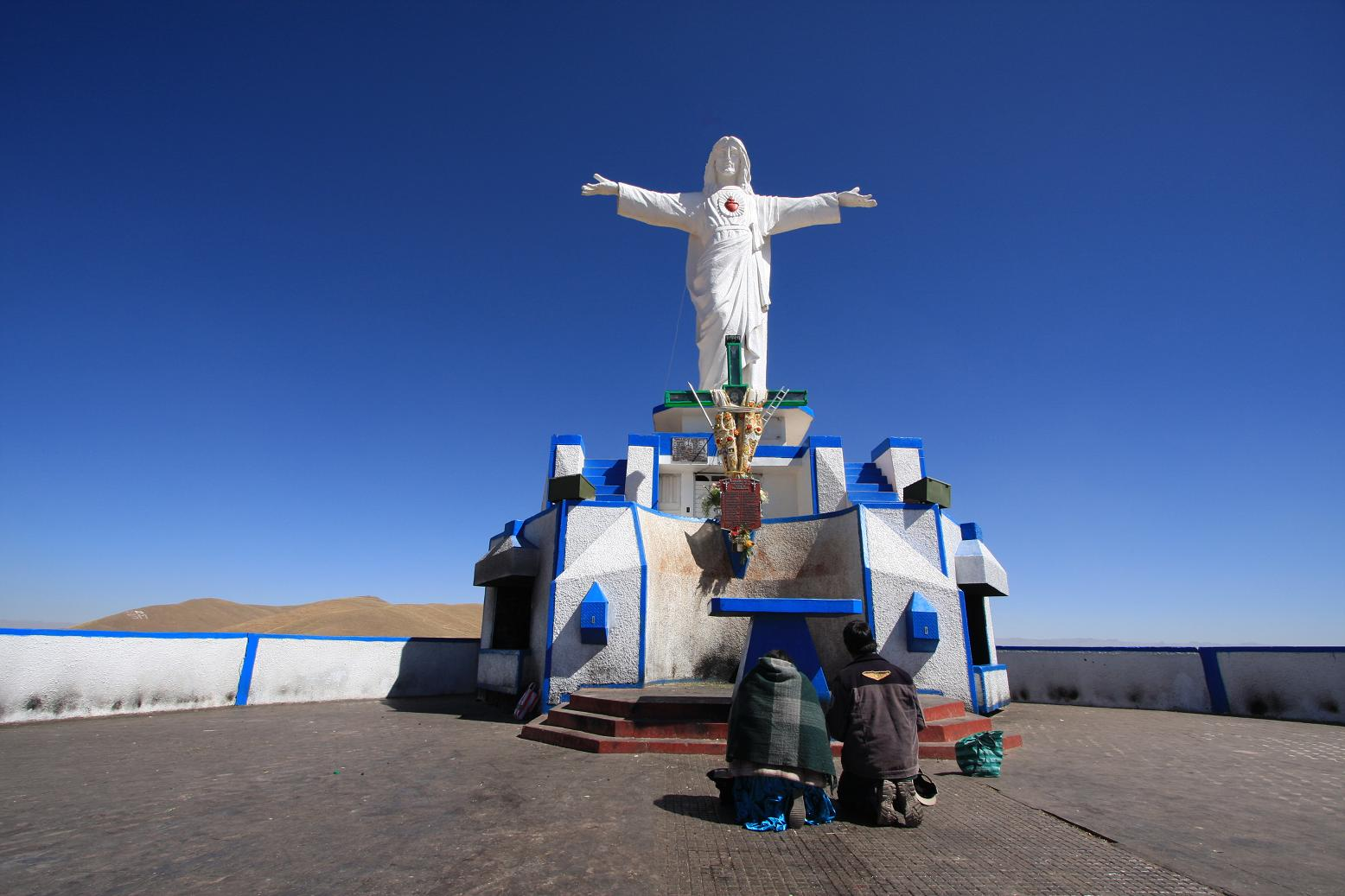
White Christ

=== Waynaruqi hill ===
Located southeast of the Plaza de Armas, on the top of the hill Waynaruqi. The White Christ, made entirely in concrete and fiberglass, stands out on the horizon of Juliaca. At the foot of the monument is a viewpoint, from which it is possible to see the urban and non-urban areas that comprise the city. The complex was built in just two and a half weeks, and was opened in 1987.

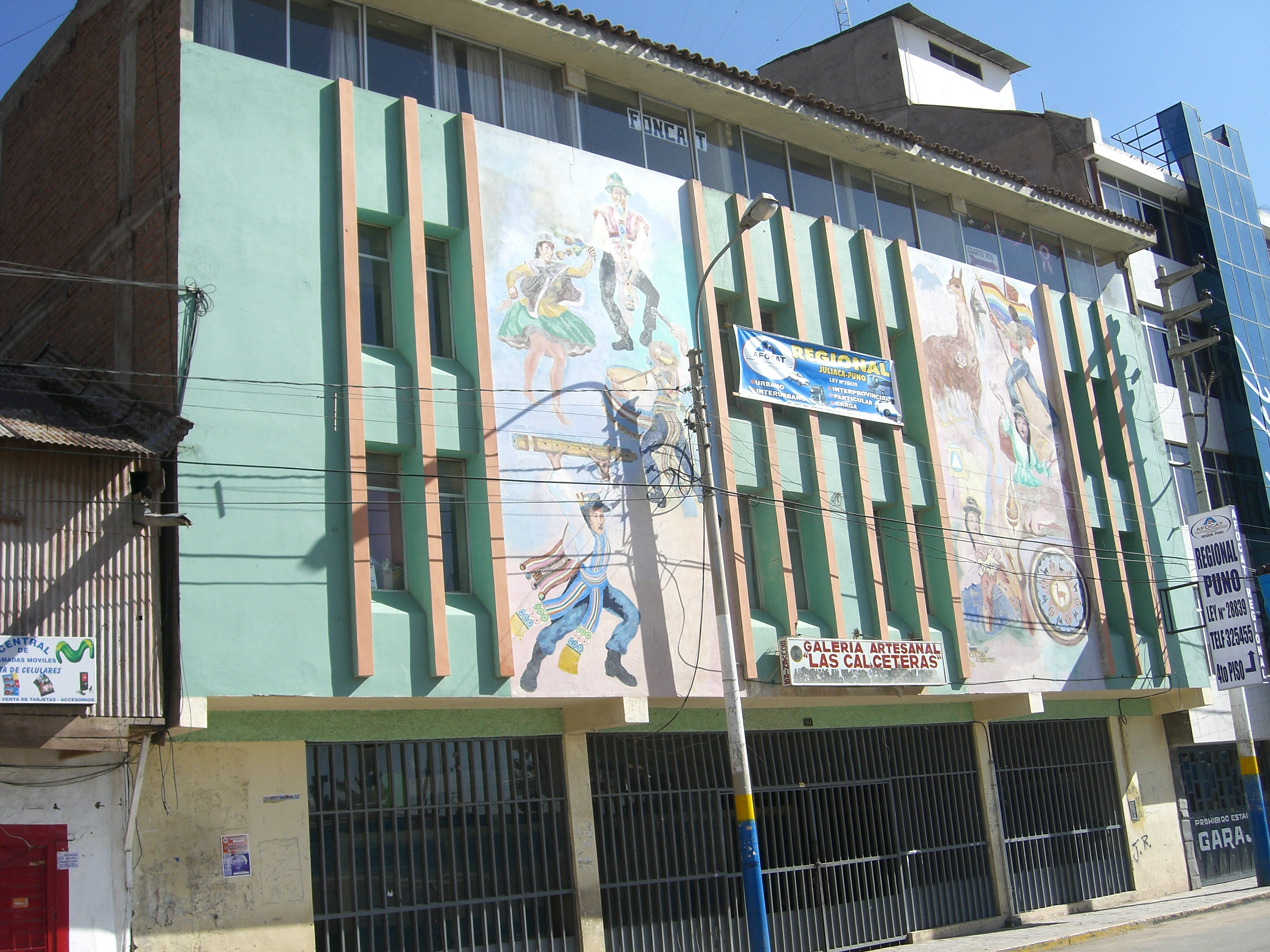
Las Calceteras Gallery

=== Las Calceteras Gallery ===
It is a three-floor building, located in the north wing of the Plaza Bolognesi. It is a shopping center for handicrafts, where all kinds of clothing are sold (socks, chullos, bootees, shawls, sweaters, rugs, gloves, etc.) woven or manufactured with native materials (llama, alpaca, vicuña), the visitor can also visualize the handwork done by the artisan ladies with their typical clothing (called hosiery), in different types of wool and fiber, highly appreciated in the international market.

=== Chacas Lagoon ===
Located 10 km northwest of the city of Juliaca, in the area corresponding to the towns of Kokan and Chacas. It is a lagoon surrounded by vast hills, like the Iquinito (which is the highest in the area), the lagoon has a fusiform shape and an area of approximately 6.2 km^{2}. In this abundant lagoon the local flora and fauna, mainly during the summer (rainy season).

== Gallery ==
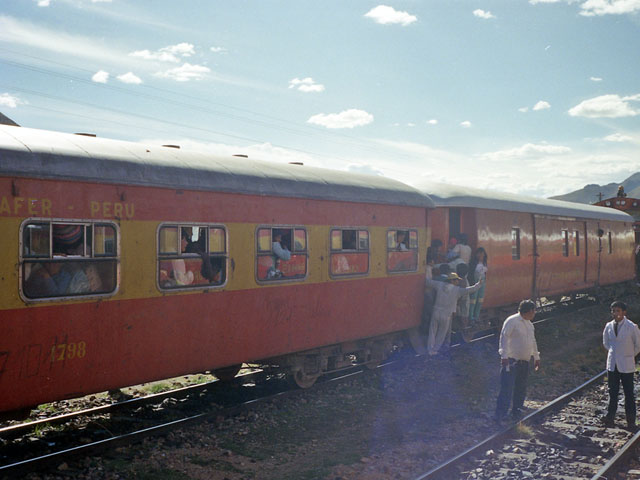
1980's Train in Juliaca

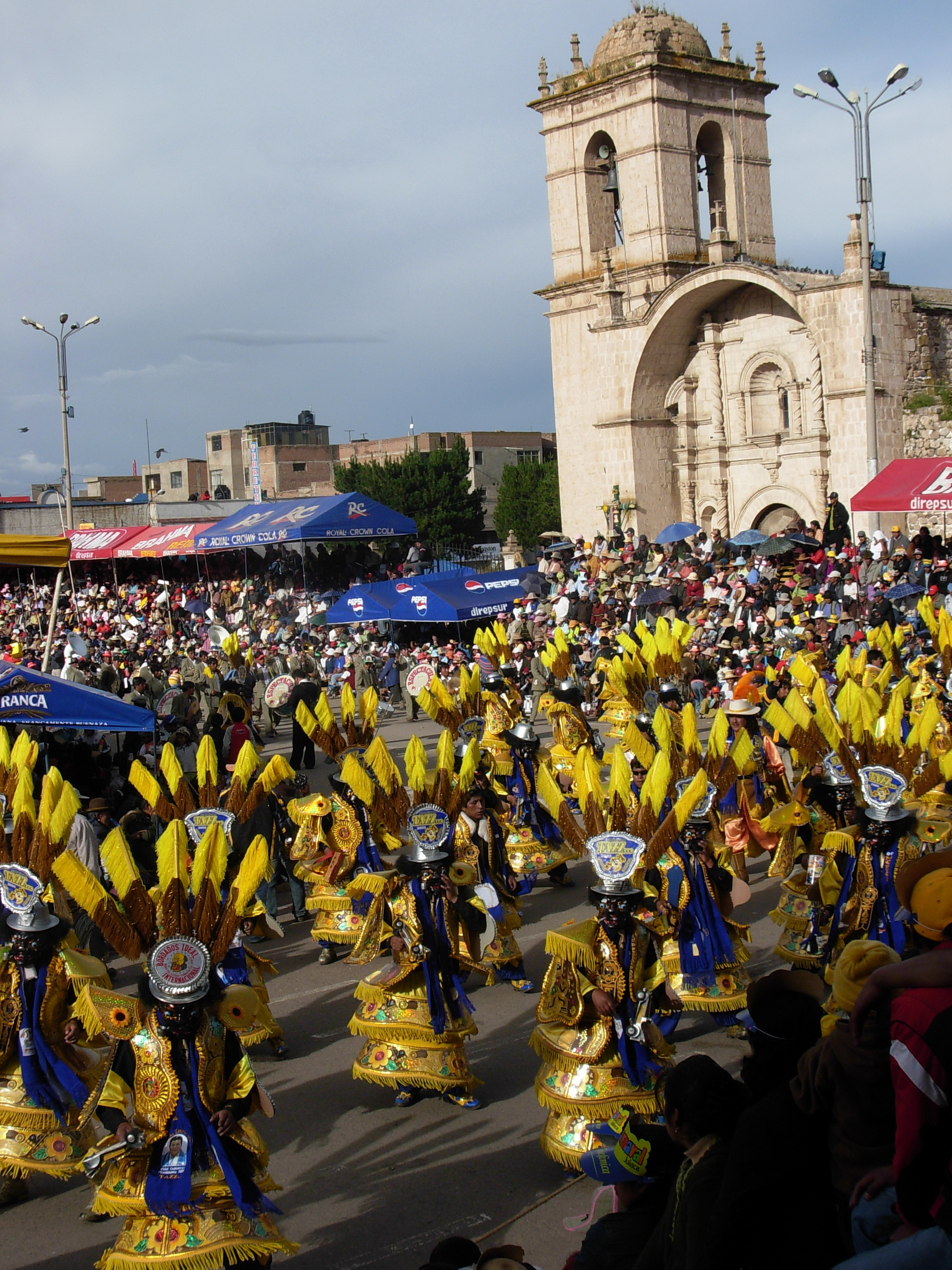
Juliaca's Carnival

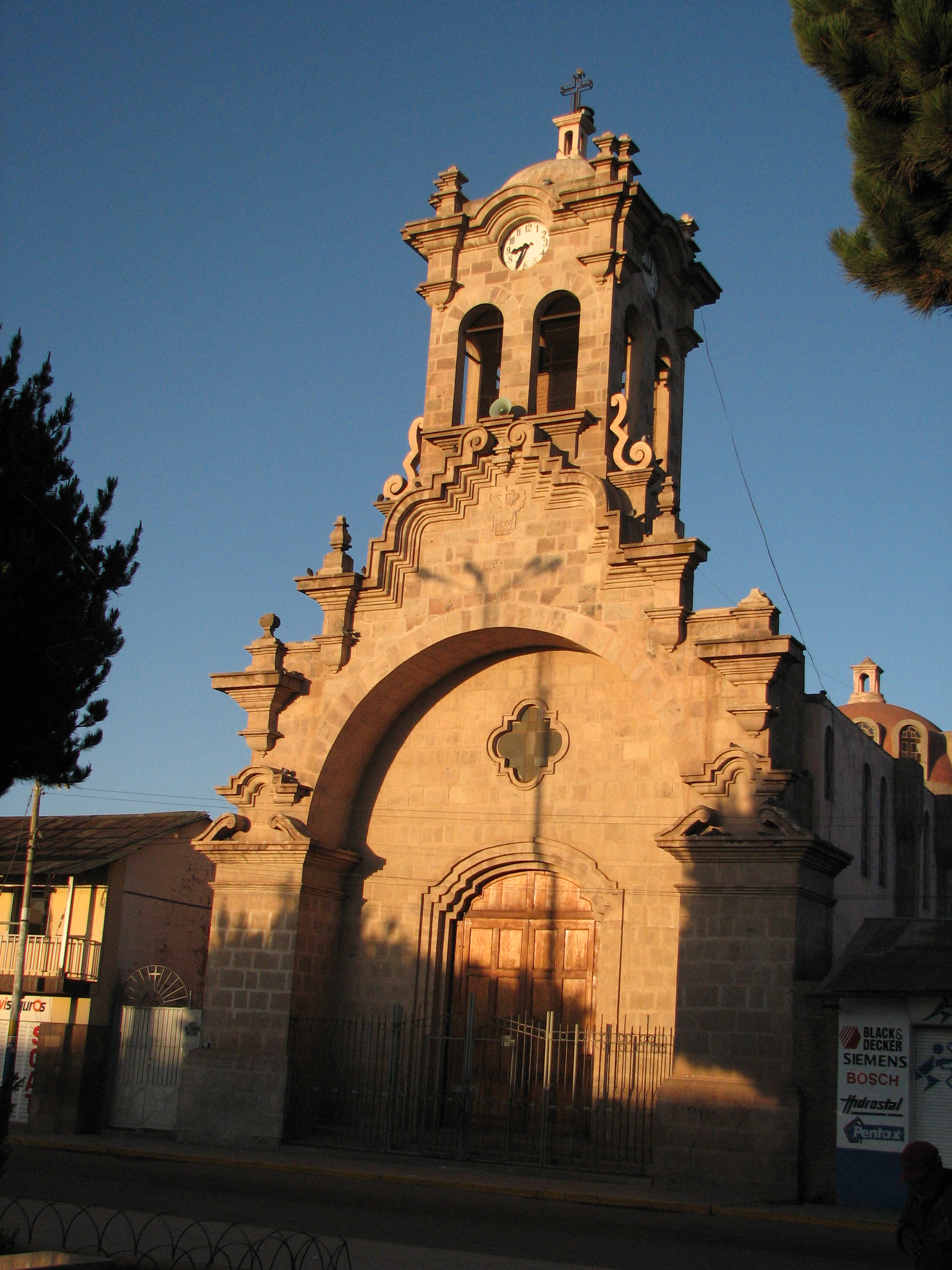
La Merced church

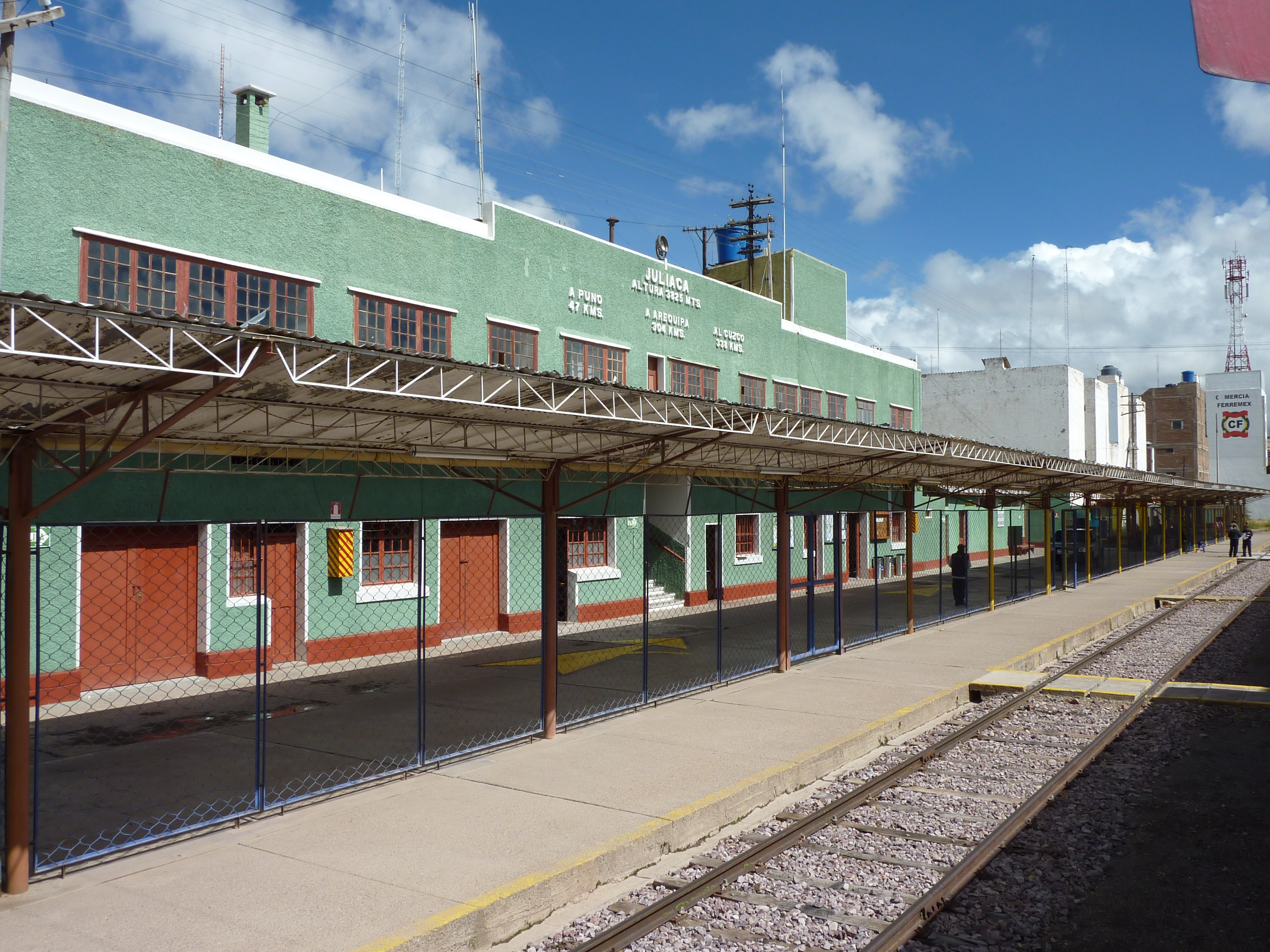
Juliaca Train Station

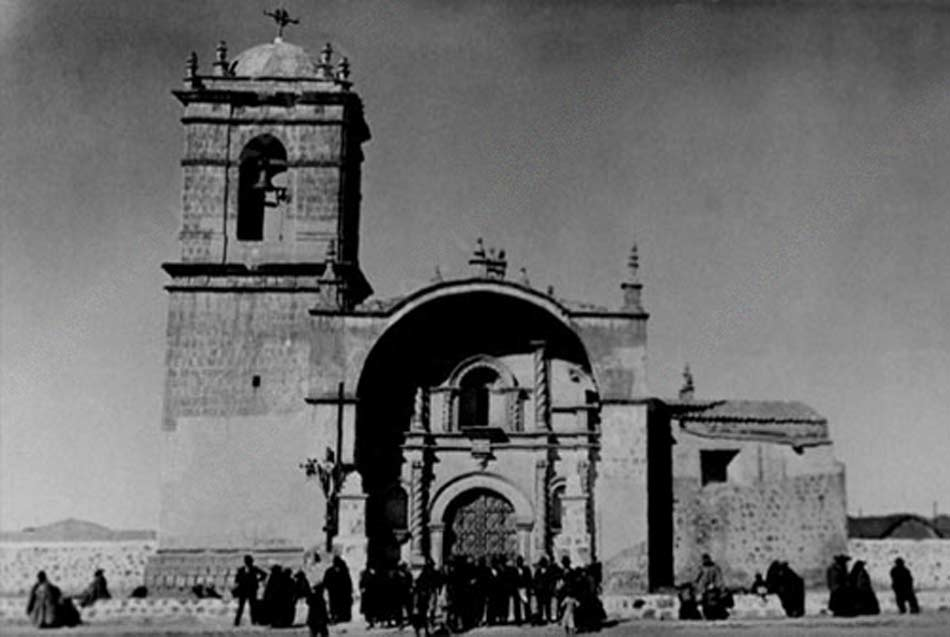
Santa Catalina Church in 1940

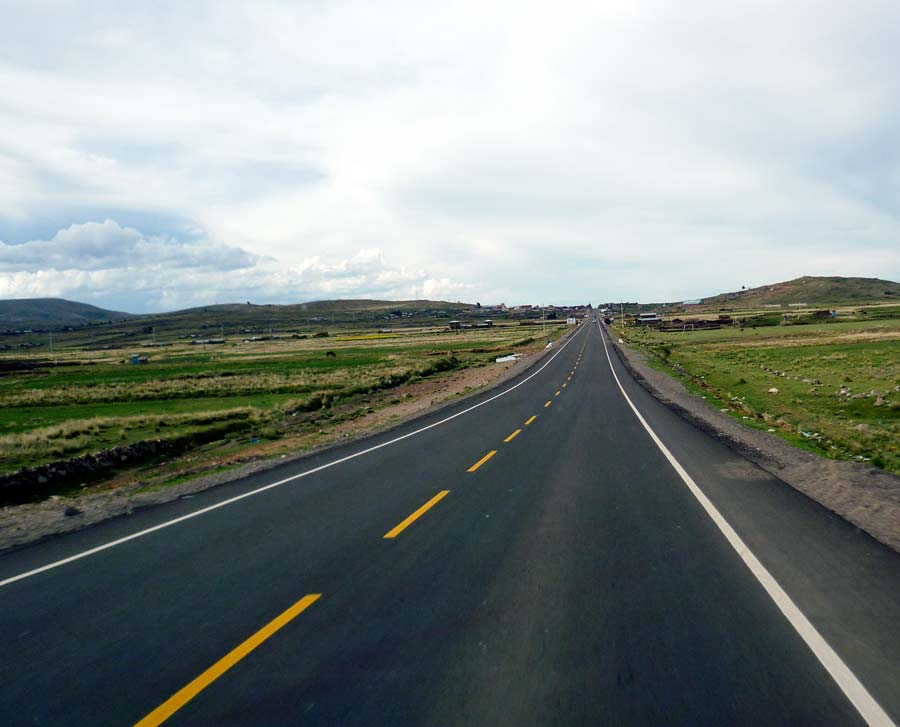
Road to Puno

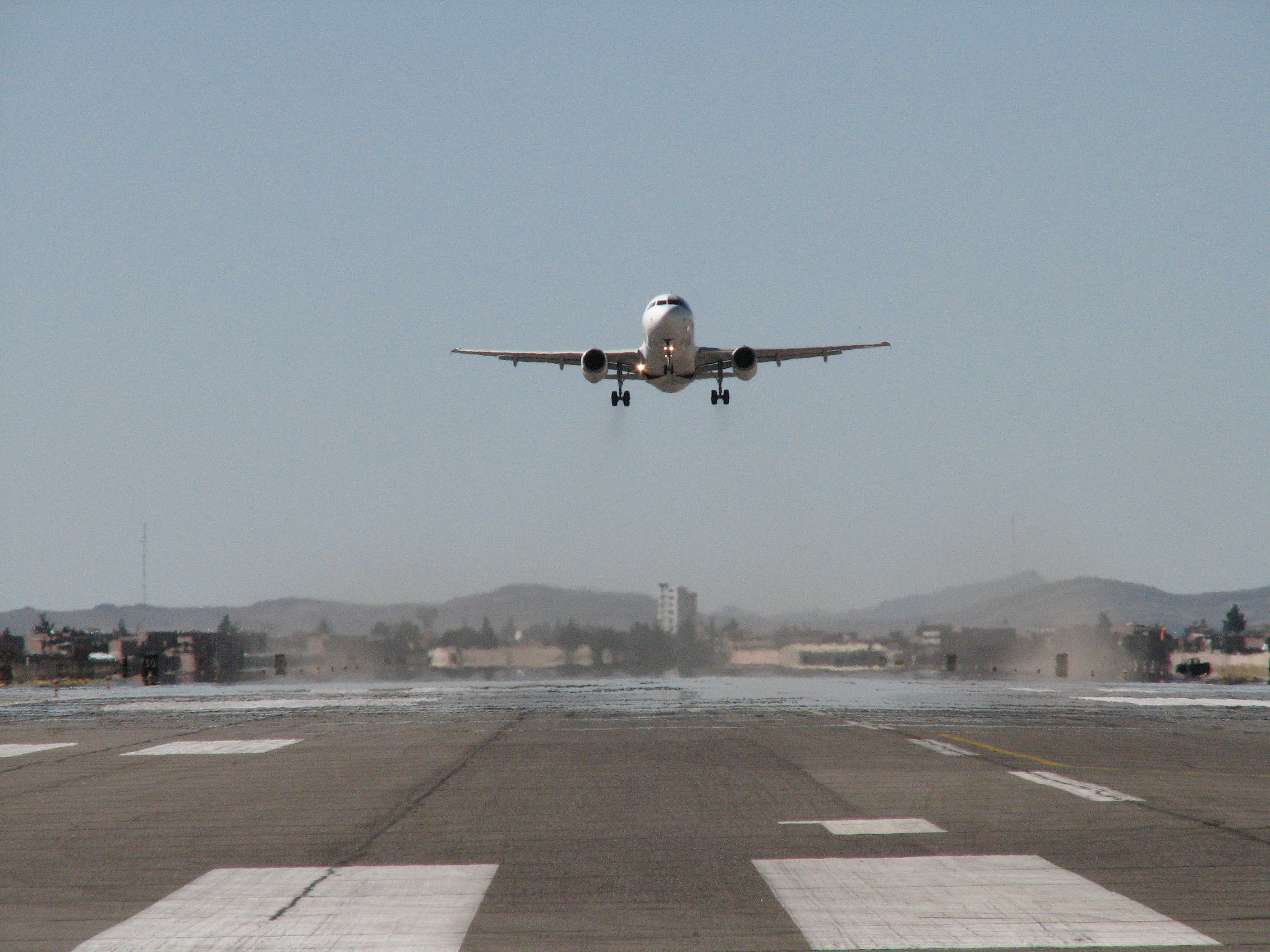
Inka Manqu Qhapaq Airport

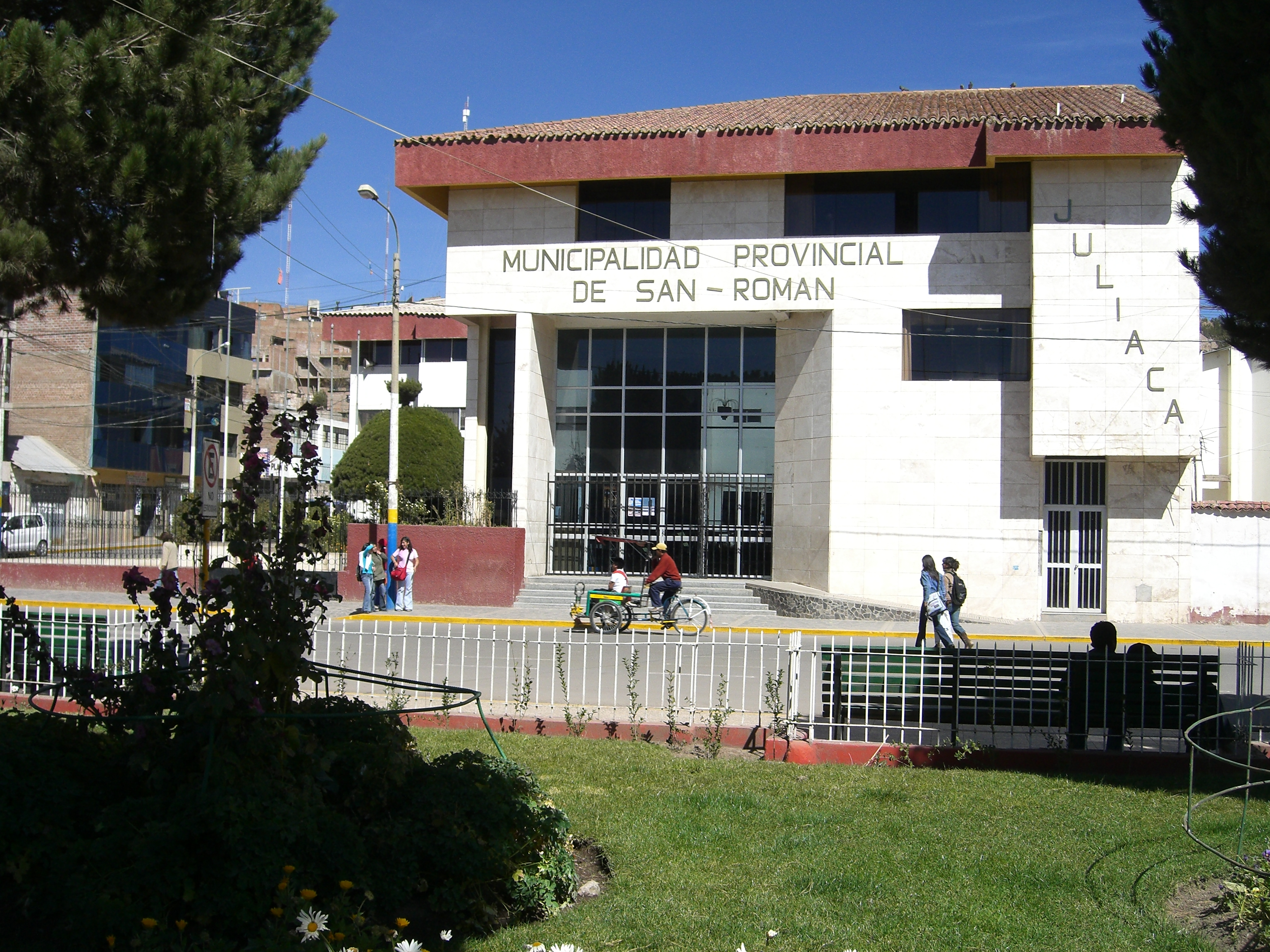
Juliaca's Prefecture

== See also ==
- Colegio Parroquial Franciscano San Román
- PeruRail
