= Atuncolla District =

Atuncolla Hatunqulla
- District
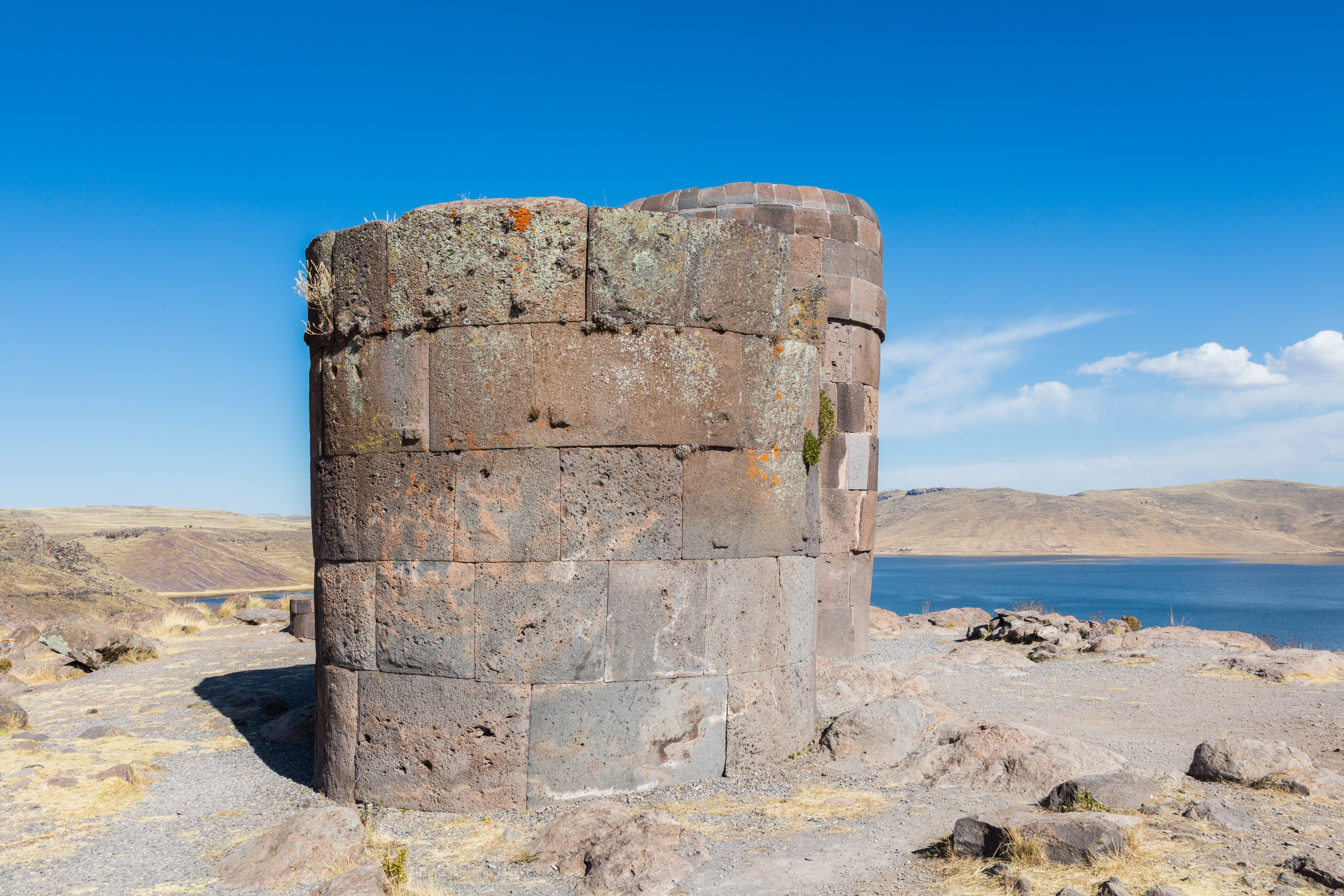
- Sillustani and Lake Umayo
- Interactive map of Atuncolla
- Coordinates: 15°41′17″S 70°08′39″W
- Country: Peru
- Region: Puno
- Province: Puno
- Capital: Atuncolla

Government
  - Mayor: Nestor Quispe Ito

Area
  - Total: 124.74 km^{2} (48.16 sq mi)
- Elevation: 3,822 m (12,539 ft)

Population (2005 census)
  - Total: 3,984
  - Density: 31.94/km^{2} (82.72/sq mi)
- Time zone: UTC-5 (PET)
- UBIGEO: 210104

Atuncolla District is one of fifteen districts of Puno Province in Peru.

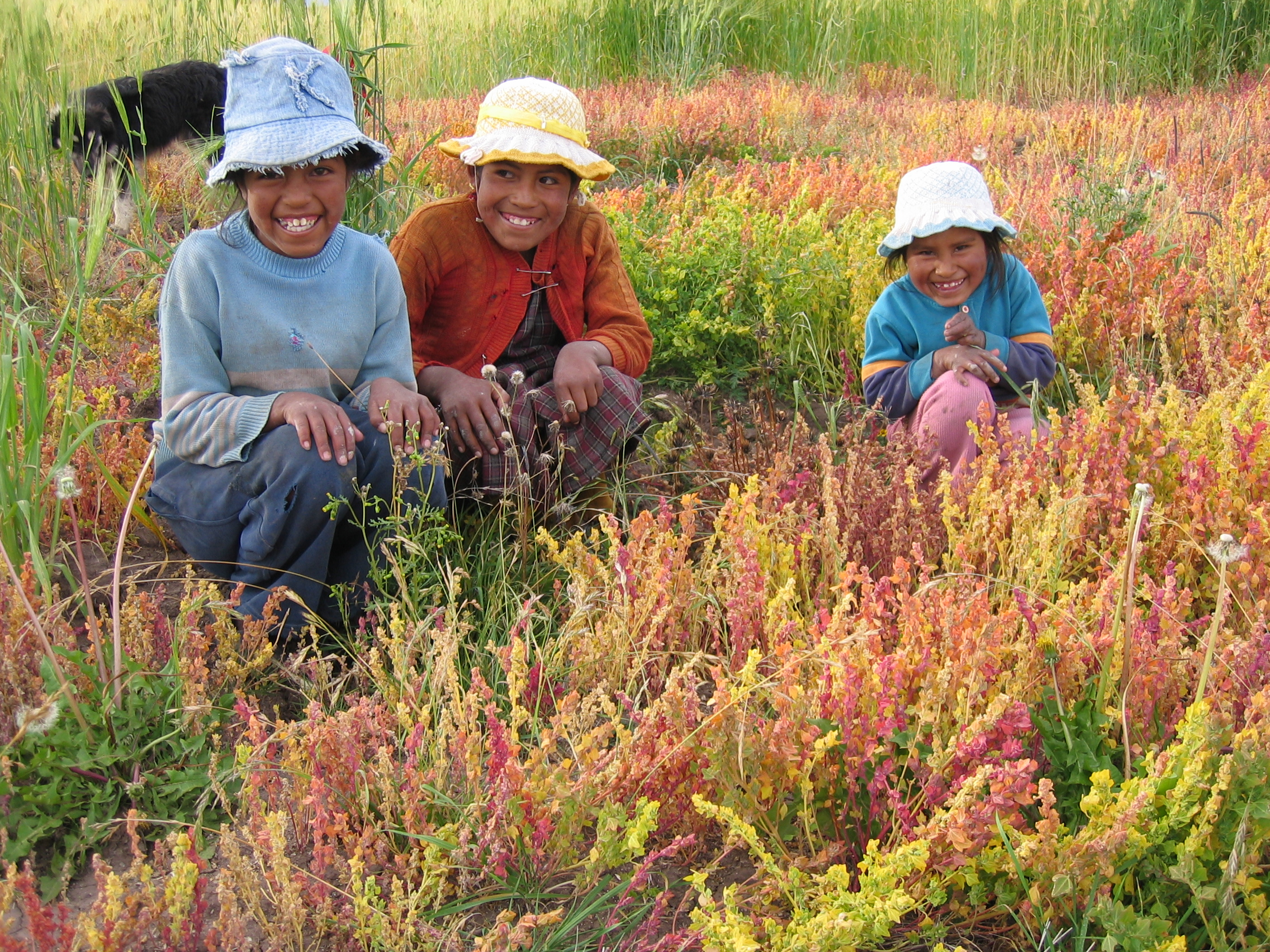
Canihua (Chenopodium pallidicaule) is one of the few crops that can be cultivated at the high elevations of Atuncolla district.

== Ethnic groups ==
The people in the district are mainly indigenous citizens of Quechua descent. Quechua is the first language which the majority of the population (90.06%) learnt to speak in childhood. 9.23% of the residents speak Spanish as a first language. (2007 Peru Census).

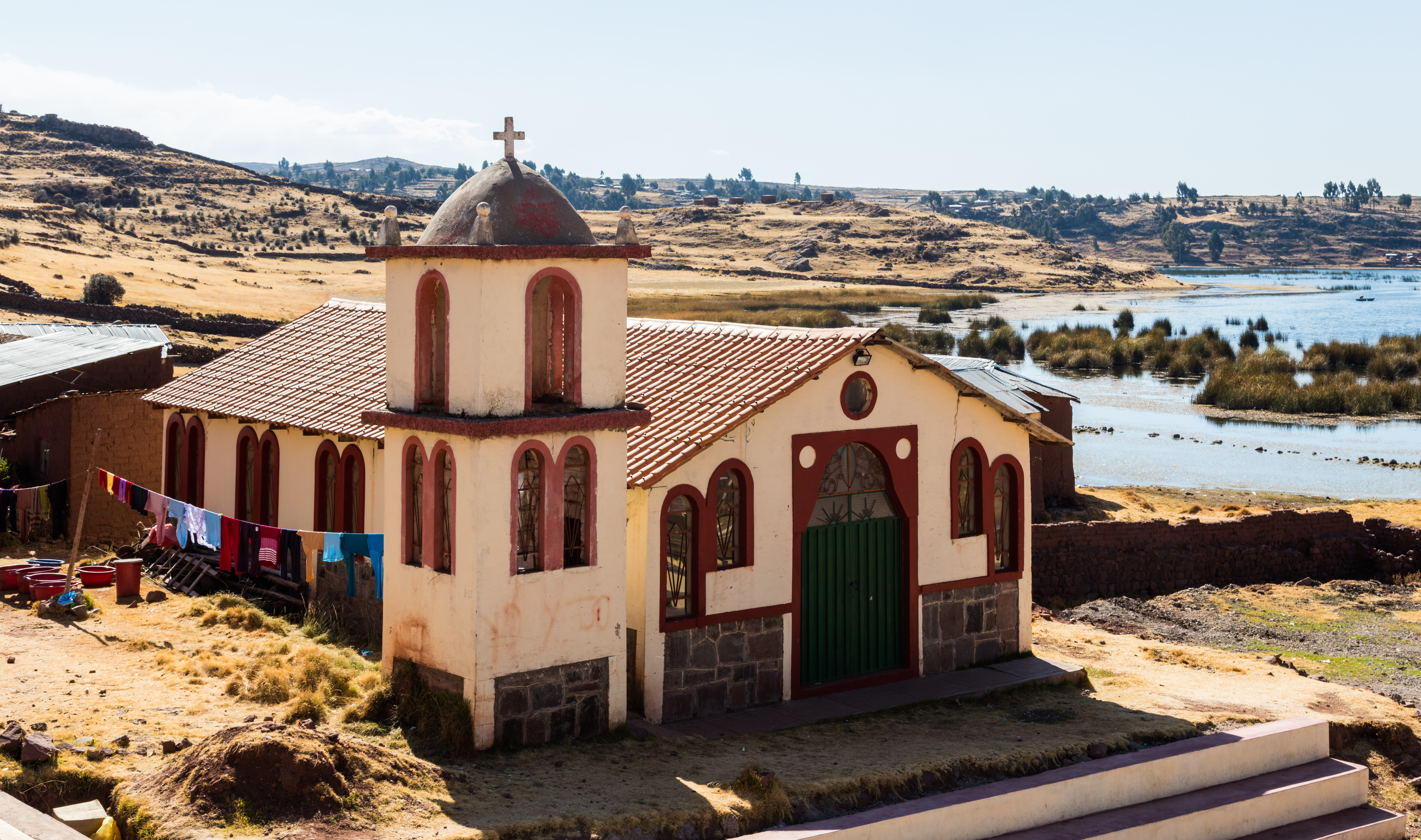
Church in Sillustani, Atuncolla district.

== See also ==
- Hatunqucha
- Lake Umayo
- Sillustani
