= Hatunqucha =

Hatunqucha (Quechua hatun big, qucha lake, "big lake", Hispanicized spellings and names Atuncocha, Jatunccocha, Jatuncocha, Cocha Grande, Cochagrande) may refer to:

- Hatunqucha (Junín), a lake in the Junín Region, Peru
- Hatunqucha (Pirqa Rumi), a lake in the Santa Cruz District, Huaylas Province, Ancash Region, Peru, near Pirqa Rumi
- Hatunqucha (Puno), a lake in the Puno Region, Peru
- Hatunqucha (Qaras), a lake in the Santa Cruz District, Huaylas Province, Ancash Region, Peru, near the mountain Qaras
