= Lake Umayo =

Lake in Peru

Lake Umayo Laguna Umayo
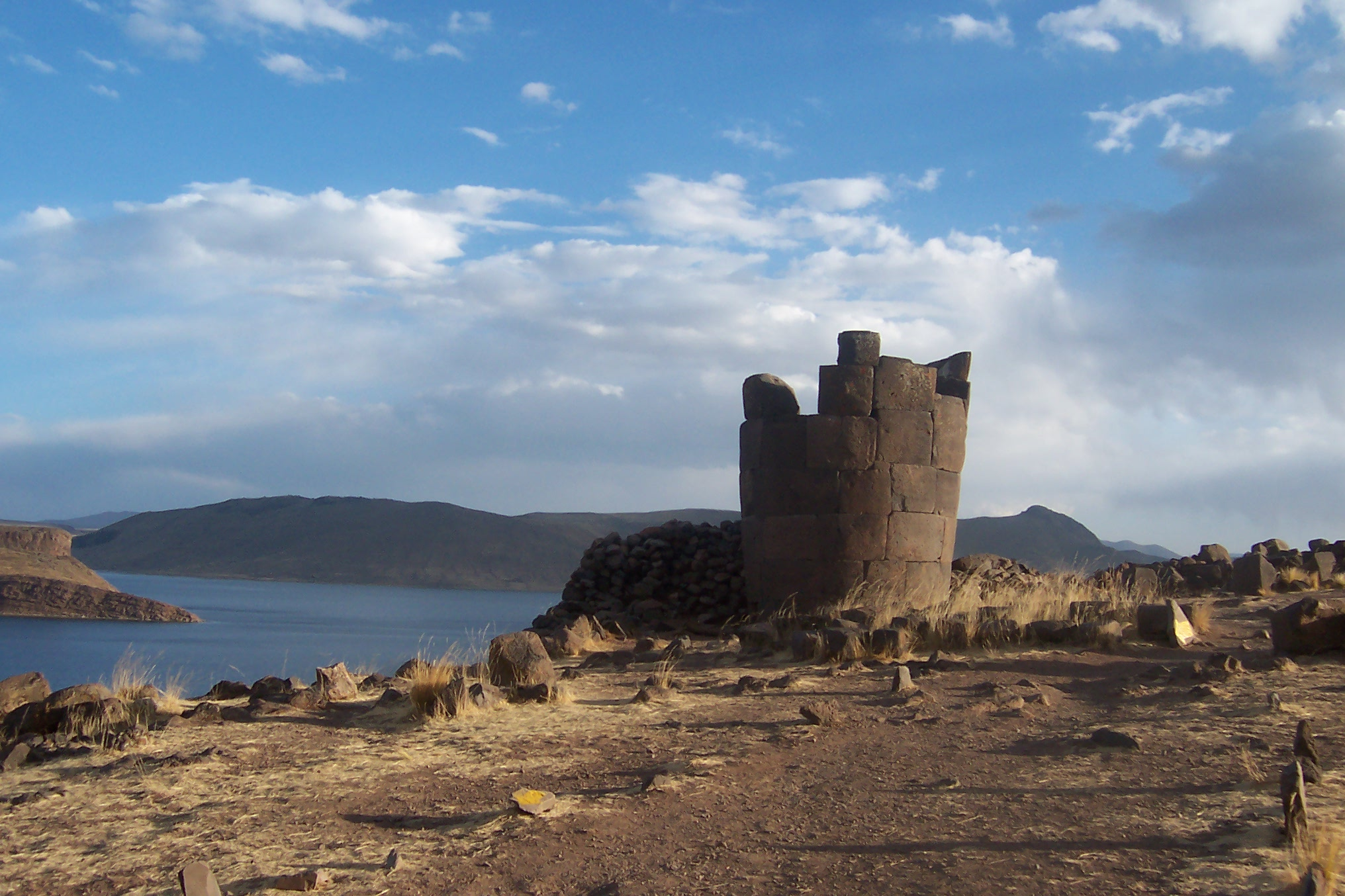

- Location within Peru
- Location: Puno Region
- Coordinates: 15°44′34″S 70°11′23″W
- Basin countries: Peru

Lake Umayo (Spanish: Laguna Umayo) is a lake in Atuncolla District of the Puno Region of Peru. The Sillustani burial ground is near the shores of the lake. The lake is located at an elevation of 3,844 metres (12,612 ft) and is about 8 kilometres (5.0 mi) long and 3 kilometres (1.9 mi) wide.

== Gallery ==
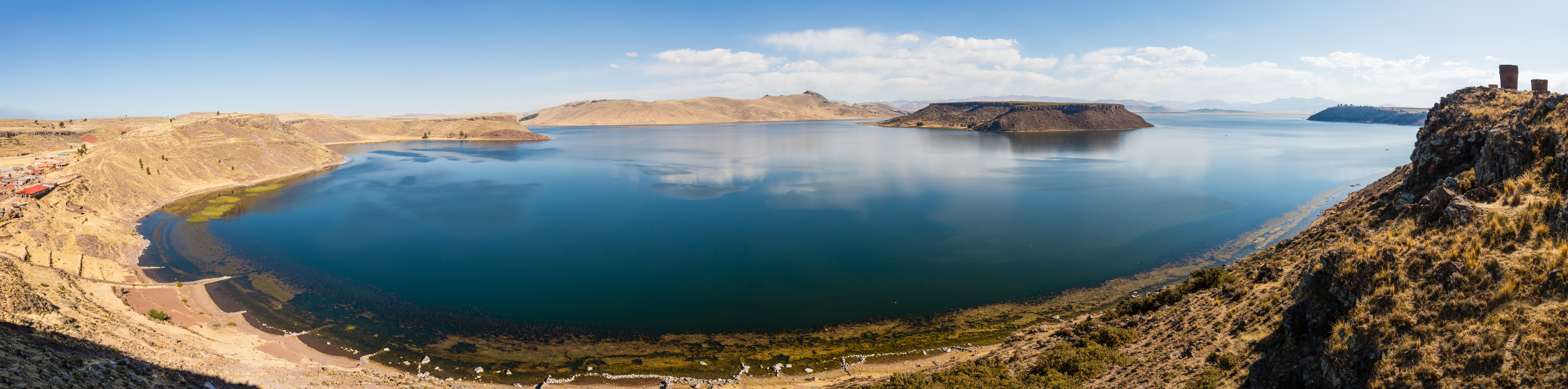
Lake Umayo

== See also ==
- List of lakes in Peru
- Hatunqucha

== Bibliography ==
- INEI, Compendio Estadistica 2007, page 26
