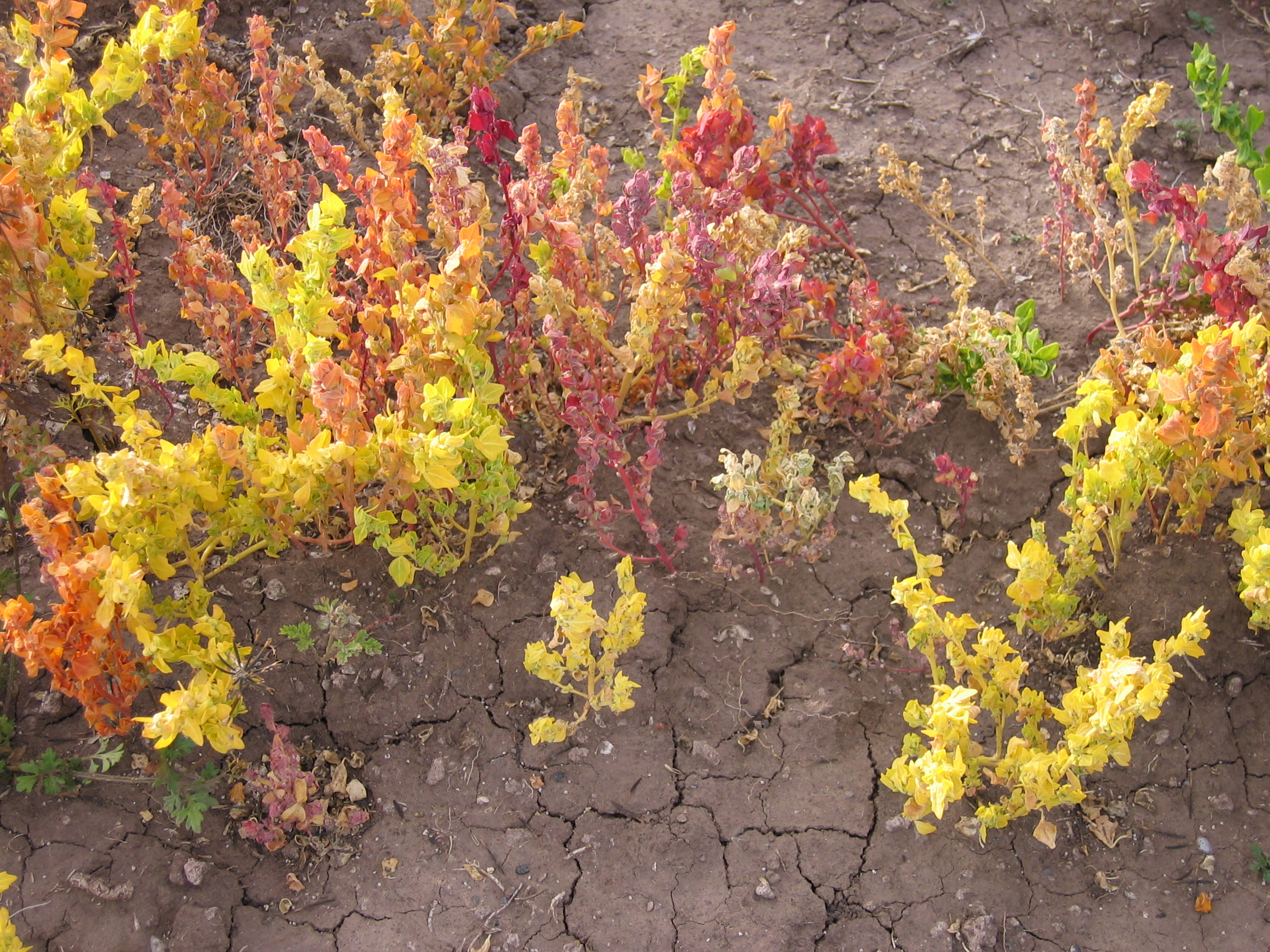
- Chenopodium pallidicaule growing in Atuncolla near Sillustani, Peru, at an elevation of ca. 3,900 metres

Scientific classification
- Kingdom: Plantae
- Clade: Tracheophytes
- Clade: Angiosperms
- Clade: Eudicots
- Order: Caryophyllales
- Family: Amaranthaceae
- Genus: Chenopodium
- Species: C. pallidicaule

Binomial name
- Chenopodium pallidicaule Aellen

= Chenopodium pallidicaule =

Species of plant

Chenopodium pallidicaule, known as cañihua, canihua or cañahua (from Quechua 'qañiwa, qañawa or qañawi') and also kañiwa or kaniwa, is a species of goosefoot, similar in character and uses to the closely related quinoa (Chenopodium quinoa).

Cañihua is native to the Andean region, with more than 200 varieties, and it has been farmed in the Altiplano for millennia. It is high in protein and dietary fiber, with rich phenolic content.

== Description ==
Cañihua is a herbaceous and annual plant. There are two types of this species, which differ in their branching. The lasta type shows high branching, whereas the saguia type is characterized by few branching and its more erected growth. The plant grows to 20–60 centimetres (8–23 1/2 inches) high and is therefore shorter than its close relative quinoa.

Cañihua also vary from quinoa in its inflorescence and its flower traits. The inflorescences are situated on the terminal and axillar cimas. The flowers are small and without petals. There are three different types of flower. Hermaphrodite consists of both the stamen and the pistils. Another flower type are the pistillate flowers, which have pistils, but no stamens. The third type of flower are male sterile flowers.

The fruits are small and dark, which contain brown or black seed with a diameter of 0.5 to 1.5 millimetres (1/32 to 1/16 in). The fruits are deciduous, which means that the seeds are lost spontaneously and are then dispersed. Once maturation is reached, the plant stem and leaves change in colour to yellow, red, green or purple.

== Genetics ==
Cañihua is a member of the Goosefoot family (Amaranthaceae) and falls under the Chenopodium species, the genus comprises 150 herbaceous flowering plants. The species is diploid with a chromosome number of 2n = 18. It belongs to the pseudocereals, similar to the increasingly popular quinoa (Chenopodium quinoa) and is closely related to it. Cañihua (AA, 2n = 2x = 18) is a diploid A-Genome relative of the allotetraploid quinoa (AABB, 2n = 4x = 36 ). Quinoa's genome represents a recent polyploidization event between North American and Eurasian diploid species donating the A and B subgenomes of modern quinoa, respectively. The South American Cañihua is not believed to be the direct A genome donor for Quinoa but a close relative to it.

=== Breeding ===
The pseudocereal is considered a semi-domesticated plant by many researchers. Initiating genetic enhancement efforts for cañihua is necessary for the continued or intensified cultivation of this crop. The plant shows morphologically weedy characteristics, non-uniform maturation, and tendency to seed shattering. A further agronomic issue is the small seed size that makes harvesting and processing of the seed difficult.

Breeding goals are to increase the plant height and non-shattering behaviour, among other characteristics. Since 2019 a whole assembly reference genome for cañihua is available and renewed interest in improving agronomic properties using modern plant breeding is expected by experts.

=== Domestication ===
Cañihua is considered a semi-domesticated plant by many researchers. Nevertheless, clear distinctions between wild and cultivated lines can be shown phylogenetically. Chenopodium pallidicaule was domesticated by the Tiwanaku culture, a pre-Columbian civilization that thrived in the Andean Altiplano. The lacustrine region of Lake Titicaca is considered the centre of origin – it is there where genetic variability in cañihua is still greatest. Morphological seed inquiries and bibliographic reviews suggest that domestication could have occurred 3,500 years before present. In archaeological sites remains of cañihua starches are found with an age of 5,000 to 3,200 years. Other sources date the cultivation as far back as 7,000 years. The exact history of domestication remains speculative.

After the Spanish Conquest cultivation of cañihua was discouraged due to its association with indigenous cultures. Today cañihua remains confined to Peru and Bolivia and the crop has not spread outside the arid highland regions. It is cultivated in the Peruvian Sierra zone and in the Altiplano of Bolivia, with the Punio department being particularly significant for cañihua cultivation.

=== Cultivars ===
In the Peruvian highlands approximately 50 different genotypes are sown. There are different ways by which cañihua varieties are differentiated and the naming may vary by region. A possible discrimination is by coloration of seeds or fluorescence into Wila (red), Q'illu (yellow), Janq'u (white), Chiara (black) and others. Another common classification involves distinguishing varieties by their growth habitat. Saiwa varieties display an upright growth habit, Last'as exhibit a semi-prostrate one, and Pampa Last'as have a prostrate growth habit, growing close to or along the ground. Saiwa types are well-suited for hillsides due to their lodging tolerance, while Last'as materials are preferable in plains. The majority of cultivated landraces belong to the Last'as type.

There are only a few improved landraces of or even cultivars of cañihua. In Peru, the National Institute for Agricultural Innovation (INIA) has selected four landraces with favorable agronomic characteristics: Cupis, Ramis, and Illpa INIA 406. In Bolivia there are three improved varieties belonging to the Last'as type: Kullaca, Illimani and the most resent Qañawiri. Improved landraces typically show outstanding yield and reduced risk of grain losses in the maturity stage and during harvest.

There is an ongoing conservation effort for the genetic diversity of cañihua in Peru. The germplasm banks of Camacani-UNA-Puno and Illpa-INIA-Puno currently house 430 unique samples from specific locations, accompanied by passport data and agronomic and morphological characterizations.

== Cultivation ==
Cañihua is a half-domesticated plant from the highlands of Bolivia and Peru, cultivated as a pseudocereal crop for its seeds. Both the seeds and leaves are edible.

The plant was often cultivated in South America in the past. More than 200 varieties are known in Bolivia, but only twenty are still in use, with a majority of farmers cultivating just one.

=== Environmental requirements ===
Cañihua is well-adapted to the Andean climate and therefore cold-resistant in all growth stages. Adult plants are also resistant to night frosts. In vegetative stage, the plant may survive until –10 °C, flowers until –3 °C and is growing until temperatures up to 28 °C at sufficient humidity.

Cañihua can be grown from 1500 m up to 4400 m, but is rarely cultivated below 3800 m. The plant exhibits a high resistance to abiotic stressors. Cañihua can tolerate drought as it is adapted to low rainfall and dry conditions. With a growing season precipitation of 500 to 800 mm, irrigation becomes unnecessary. Furthermore, Cañihua displays resilience to saline conditions, often prevalent in areas with fast-growing populations and low water availability. Cañihua can be grown in any type of moderately fertile soil, including shallow, acidic and alkaline soils. Cañihua tolerates a broad spectrum of high and low temperatures and is not affected by frost. Also, its seeds germinate at low temperatures. However, the plant does not grow well in the shade, near the sea or in excessively humid conditions.

=== Plant development ===
As an annual crop, cañihua reaches maturity in 95 to 150 days, depending on variety. Germinating starts at soil temperatures of 5 °C. Flowering happens from July to October at temperatures around 10 °C and ripening from August to October at 15 °C.

=== Harvesting and post-harvesting ===
Cañihua has to be harvested at colour change, before full maturation, to prevent high yield losses due to seed scattering. The crop has to be cut, dried and threshed by hand or using a wheat thresher. Papery husks enclose the seeds and have to be washed and rubbed away. Average seed yield is 400–900 kg/ha in traditional cropping systems. In intensive systems, yields of 2–3 t can be obtained. 1,000–kernel weight (weight in grams of 1,000 seeds) is only 480 mg, compared to 1,900–4,000 mg of quinoa.

=== Potential and risks ===
Cañihua is often considered as a forgotten crop once widely used in the Andes, but now replaced by other crops such as millet. Today, cañihua has significance only at higher altitudes, where neither quinoa nor millet can grow.

There are numerous native varieties in the Peruvian highlands, some have beneficial agronomic characteristics. The varieties are interesting for inclusion in breeding programs, aimed to enhance the adaptability of cañihua for cultivation on larger scales. So far limited investment has been made into the agronomic improvement of cañihua. One possible reason could be that the Amaranthaceae family consists of plants with comparable characteristics, resulting in potential market competition. On the other hand, the success of quinoa and the increasing demand for it in western countries, could facilitate the entry to the global market.

Compared to quinoa, the value chain of cañihua from producers to both rural and urban markets is underdeveloped. For the rural livelihoods in South America cañihua has potential regarding food security, nutrition and self-reliance.

The crop was experimentally produced in Finland and showed good results. The risk of outcrossing is very small, as cañihua is self-pollinating. The risk of becoming invasive remains. As normally grown under harsh conditions with low weed pressure, this crop could suffer yield losses in varying climates. To overcome the higher weed pressure, planting in rows can facilitate weeding. Further research is required for improving fertilization, and thus increasing yields. Locally there are good results with sheep manure and nearly no fertilizer needs to be applied in crop rotations with potatoes. The most important breeding aims are the reduction of seed scattering and increased seed size.

== Uses ==
Cañihua can easily be milled to flour and can be prepared further as a toasted cañihua flour called cañihuaco. Cañihuaco has a nutty taste and can be mixed with water and milk for a breakfast meal. Since it is rich in calories and proteins, local people take it on long travels. Additionally, cañihua flour can be used for a lot of other purposes such as bread-making, pastry-making and noodle-making. Some varieties of cañihua can even be included in sweets, snacks and weaning food mixtures.

The cooking and extrusion technology tests have already shown successful results in several countries. This technology present numerous advantages such as low cost, simple operation, moderate production volume, minimum auxiliary equipment, versatility, good sanitary conditions and easy management. Results from a study demonstrated that the initial moisture content of 12% was optimal to obtain an extrudate with good physicochemical characteristics (e.g. degree of gelatinization, sectional expansion index, water absorption index, water solubility index and density). Additionally, roasting does not significantly affect the dialysability of nutritionally valuable minerals in qañiwa. Boiling, however, was found to increase zinc, iron and calcium dialysability.

=== Importance for food security ===
Cañihua is an important crop for food security in the Andean region where there are nutritional problems. The most affected group are rural families having limited access to commodities due to poverty and droughts. Cañihua is both easily accessible and drought-resistant, offering potential food and income for highland farmers.

In order to alleviate problems of food security, new food-processing technologies and products are being developed to encourage companies to process native Andean crops and to increase their consumption as well as open market opportunities using cañihua.

=== Nutrition ===
The indigenous Andean food crops, quinoa (Chenopodium quinoa), kiwicha (Amaranthus caudatus) and cañihua have high nutritional value based mainly on their considerable protein content and dietary fiber value. Their protein, calcium, zinc and iron content is higher than that of more widely commercialized cereals.

The protein content (15.3%) of cañihua grain is higher than that of quinoa and kiwicha, and similar to wheat (12.6%) and oats (16.9%). The proteins of cañihua mainly belong to the albumin and the globulin type. These two protein types are non-glutens and have a very good amino acid balance. The grains contain all nine essential amino acids thus lysine, histidine, threonine, methionine, valine, isoleucine, leucine, phenylalanine and tryptophan and meet the children's and adults' daily requirements for essential amino acids. They are especially rich in sulfur amino acids, lysine and aromatic amino acids. Cañihua is also rich in phenolic content.

The lipids consist mainly of unsaturated fatty acids. The unsaturated fatty acids account for 71.4% of the total lipid content in cañihua. They consist of high concentrations of linoleic acid (39.2%), an omega-6 fatty acid which is essential for human health, and oleic acid (28.6%), an omega-9 fatty acid. Generally, polyunsaturated fatty acids are the most abundant followed by monounsaturated and saturated fatty acids.

As an Andean grain, cañihua has a high content of carbohydrates with starch as the most prevalent sugar. With percentages of 1% of glucose, 2% of sucrose and 1% of maltose, amounts of free sugars are rather small, but slightly higher than those of quinoa or amaranth.

Unlike quinoa, cañihua contains a lower amount of the bitter tasting saponins which affect taste and texture.

Furthermore, cañihua is considered as a good source of thiamine, riboflavin, niacin and vitamin C.

Nutritional value per 100 g
Energy	1331-1595 kJ (318-381 kcal)
Carbohydrates	61.0-66.2 g
Available carbohydrates	45.5 g
Dietary fibers	15.5 g
Fat	3.5-8.9 g
Proteins	13.8-15.7 g
Minerals	Quantity
Calcium	87–171 mg
Iron	10.8-17.07 mg
Phosphorus	320–496 mg
Zinc	4.55 mg
Vitamins	Quantity
Niacin (B_{3})	1.2-1.56 mg
Riboflavin (B_{2})	0.3-0.75 mg
Thiamine (B_{1})	0.47-0.67 mg
Vitamin C	0.0-2.2 mg
Other constituents	Quantity
Water	10.7-12-4 g

== See also ==
- Amaranthus caudatus
- Salvia hispanica
