= Colegio Parroquial Franciscano San Román =

Private school in Juliaca, San Roman, Peru

Saint Roman Franciscan Parochial School
- Spanish: Colegio Parroquial Franciscano San Román
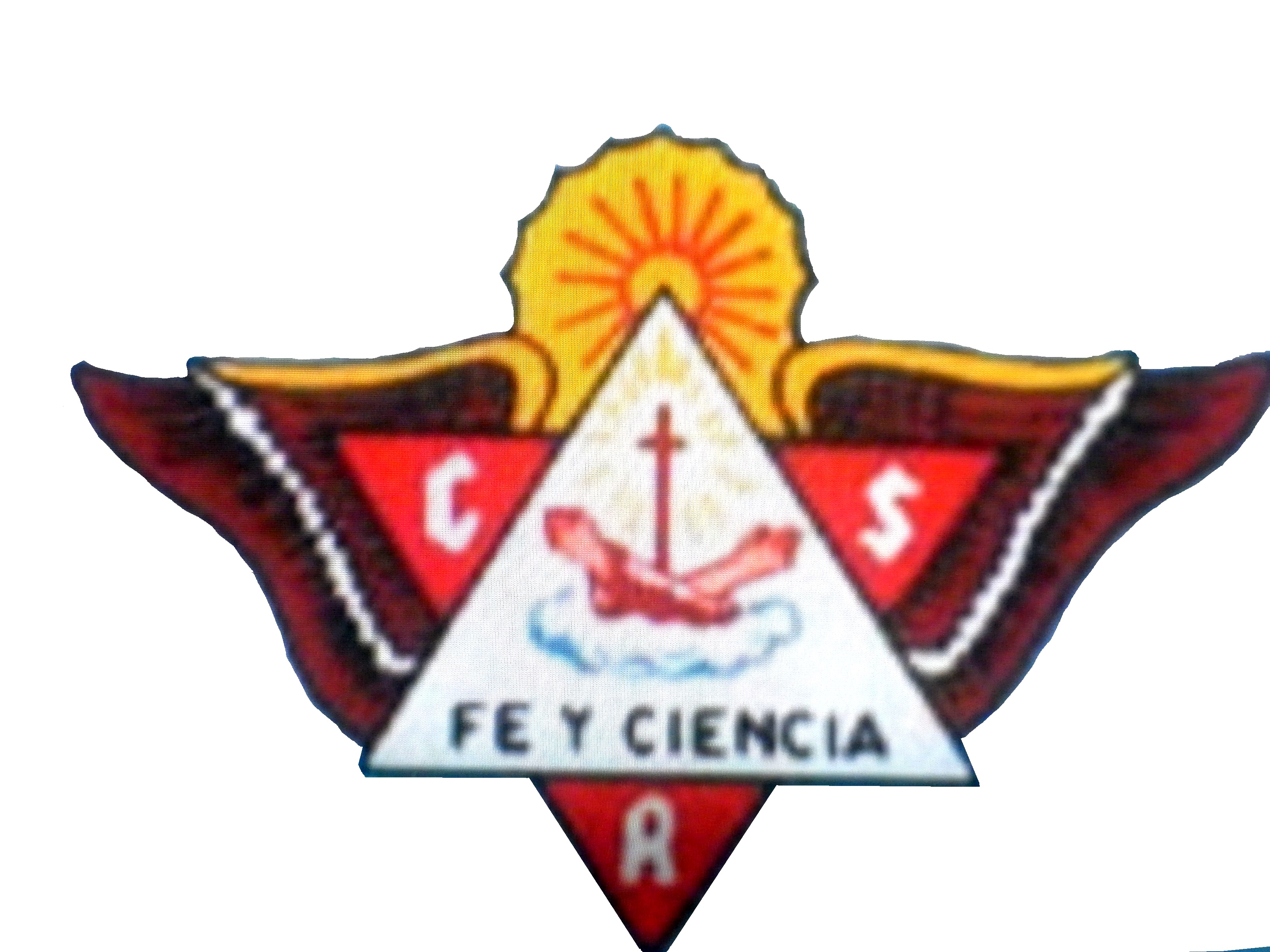

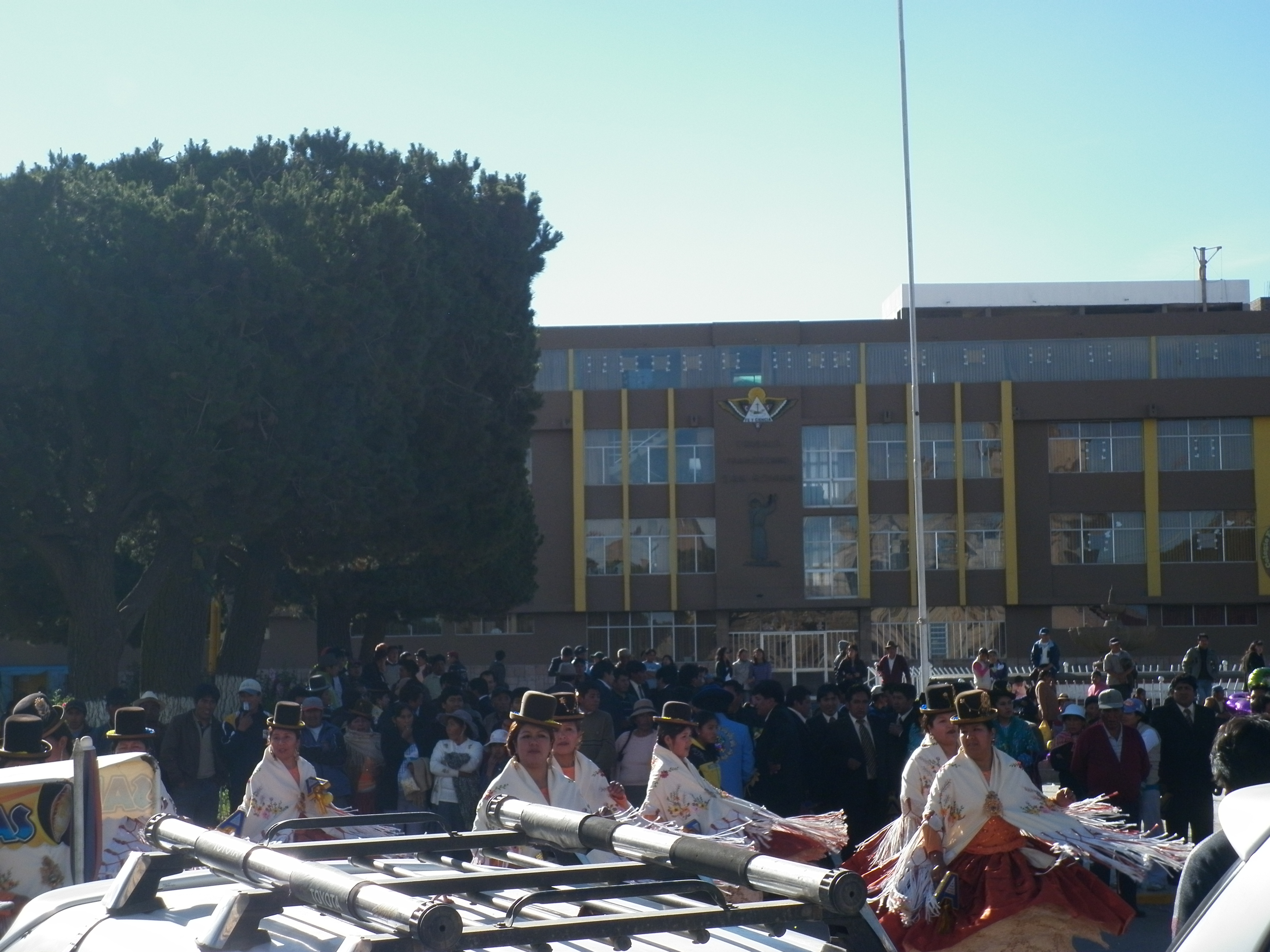
- Franciscan School Saint Roman in the Juliaca's carnival

Location
- Jr. Ica s/n. Parade Ground; Puno; Juliaca, San Roman; Peru
- Coordinates: 15°29′35.30″S 70°08′10.30″W

Information
- Type: Private primary and secondary school
- Motto: Faith and science
- Religious affiliation: Catholicism
- Denomination: Franciscans
- Founded: 1925; 101 years ago
- Founder: RP. Miguel Hernández
- Director: Willi Zegarra Hallasi
- Gender: Boys
- Enrollment: 1,750
- Colours: Green and yellow
- Newspaper: morning
- Website: cpfsanroman.edu.pe

The Colegio Parroquial Franciscano San Román (in English, Saint Roman Franciscan Parochial School) is a private Catholic primary and secondary school located in Juliaca, San Román Province, in the Puno Region of Peru. The school was founded on 15 March 1925 and is run by Franciscan friars.

== History ==
The school started as a small parochial school in 1917 called San Luis Gonzaga and located on a corner of the square at Mariano Nuñez Street. On March 15, 1925, an agreement was made between the Bishop of Puno, Fidel M. Cossio, and the Franciscans of the Province of the XII Apostles of Peru, resulting in the founding of the school. On May 13, 1925, the Reverend Father Miguel Hernandez, who was appointed director, requested of the National Council of Education authorization for the operation of the school. On November 4 of the same year, the National Education Council resolved by Resolution No. 305 to authorize the operation under the name of the San Román School.

San Román School occupied the 2,385-square-metre (25,670 sq ft)-site of the parish house of the Parish of St. Catherine of Juliaca, which accommodated 92 students at the time. The first story was built by Father Daniel Hall in 1932, blessed and inaugurated on April 10 of that year. On April 18, 1942, the R.P. Inheritance Antonio acquired an adjacent site owned by Mrs. Francisca Carpio Vda increasing the campus to 4,000 square metres (43,000 sq ft).

=== Secondary education ===
In 1951 inclusion of secondary education was granted by Ministerial Resolution No. 1659 of March 29, 1951, changing the name to Franciscan College San Román Juliaca. That same year a two-story wing was added with eight classrooms. R.P. Manuel Salas led the school into two periods: 1944–1949 and 1951–1954.

In 1965 director Father Hugo Becerra initiated work on a three-story pavilion, nine classrooms, and restrooms, with a plan developed by engineers and Iturre Rivarola and completed August 1967.

Two friars, Eugenio Ramirez Quiñonez and Theodore Sakata Andrade, arrived at the facility in 1976 and 1981, respectively. Their efforts resulted in the construction of a road and great increase in school attendance. gemidos

== Infrastructure ==
The school, located at the Square of Juliaca, includes two modern four-story dormitories and a seven-story addition. It accommodates more than 1700 students and provides classrooms and related rooms, including a computer room, museum, library, auditorium, administrative staff room, chemistry laboratory, and cafes. There is also a local radio station (Radio San Francisco) and a stadium (San Francisco Enclosed Colosseum) with capacity for 2000 spectators. The school supports music, basketball, football, riding and other extracurricular programs.

Buildings include:

- First Church of Santa Catalina
- Radio San Francisco – Juliaca
- San Francisco Enclosed Colosseum
- Club Deportivo San Franciscan Roman
- Franciscan Convent of Juliaca
- Parish Santa Catalina in Juliaca

== See also ==
- Education in Peru

== Bibliography ==
- Temas históricos de Juliaca, Hugo Apaza Quispe
- Provincia Franciscana de los Doce Apóstoles. Ideario Educativo Provincial
- Bodas de Diamante, René Calsín 2001
