= Hatunqucha (Puno) =

Lake in Peru

- Location within Peru
- Location: Peru; Puno Region, Puno Province
- Coordinates: 15°39′25″S 70°11′57″W

Hatunqucha (Quechua hatun (in Bolivia always jatun) big, large qucha lake, "big lake", Hispanicized spelling Jatuncocha) is a lake in the Altiplano in South Peru. It lies in the Puno Region, Puno Province, Atuncolla District, north of Lake Umayo.
