= Sillustani =

Archaeological site in Peru

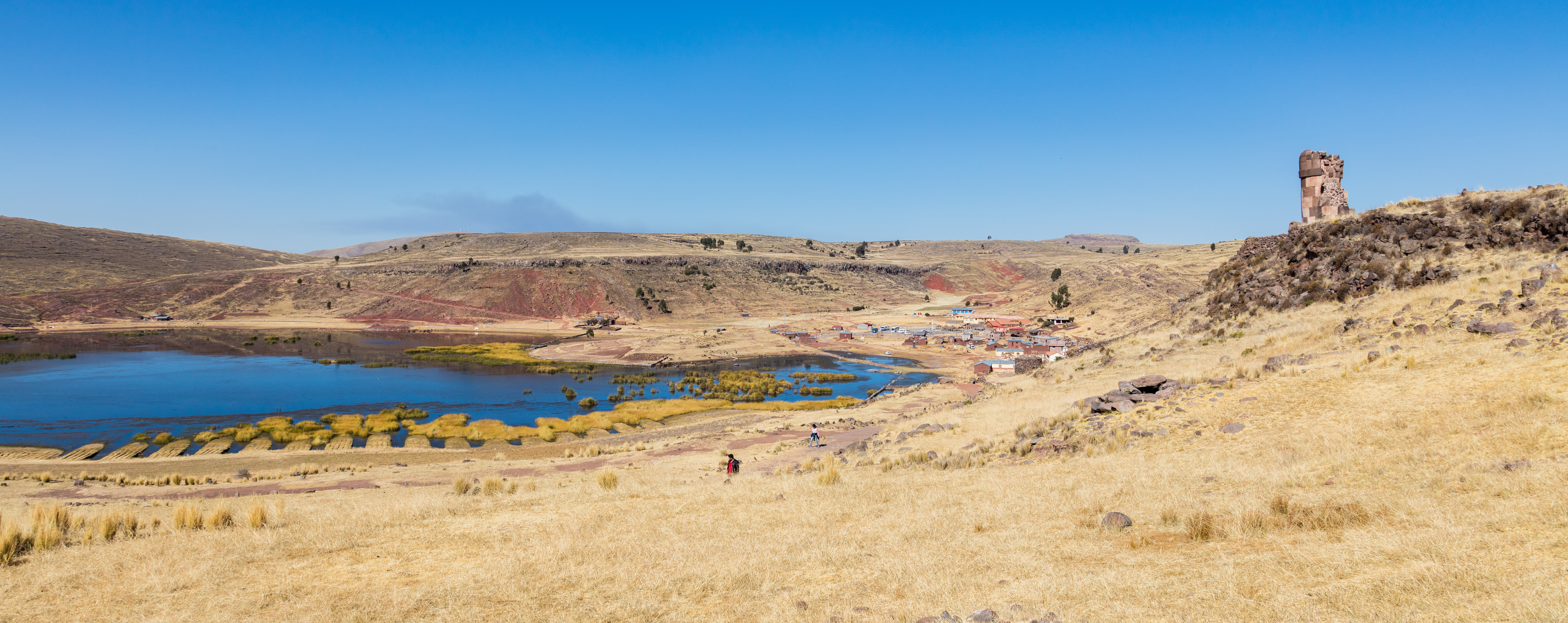
- The tallest chullpa of Sillustani, about 12m high
- Interactive map of Sillustani
- 15°43′16″S 70°09′30″W
- Type: Cemetery
- Cultures: Qulla people
- Location: Puno, Puno Region, Peru

Sillustani is a pre-Inca cemetery on the shores of Lake Umayo near Puno in Peru. The tombs, which are built above ground in tower-like structures called chullpas, are the vestiges of the Qulla people, most likely a Puquina-speaking people, conquered by the Inca Empire in the 15th century.

The structures housed the remains of complete family groups, although they were probably limited to nobility. Many of the tombs have been dynamited by grave robbers, while others were left unfinished.

== Chullpa ==
Veneration of the dead and kinship were integral parts of Aymara culture, and the huge chullpas or "chupa" at Sillustani were built to house the Aymara elite of the immediate pre-Inca and Inca period. The word was used in the 19th century and comes from the Dictionary of Ludovico Bertonio (1612). Bertonio referred to the basket burials of the semi-nomadic pastoralists as "chulpas" and actually referred to stone towers as uta amaya "houses of the soul". However, the term "chullpa" remains used today for the towers.

Many of the chullpas at Sillustani show pre-Inca characteristics that were later redressed with Inca stone blocks. Similar chullpas are found throughout the entire south Central Andes with the above ground burial styles going back at least to the mature Tiwanaku period (c. 500–950). The insides of the tombs were built to hold entire groups of people, most likely extended families of the Aymara elite. Corpses were not intentionally mummified, but in the dry environment created by the closed tomb, they survived for centuries. Most mummy bundles indicate burial in a fetal position. Some of the tombs also have various animal shapes carved into the stone. The only openings to the buildings face east, where it was believed the Sun was reborn by Mother Earth each day.

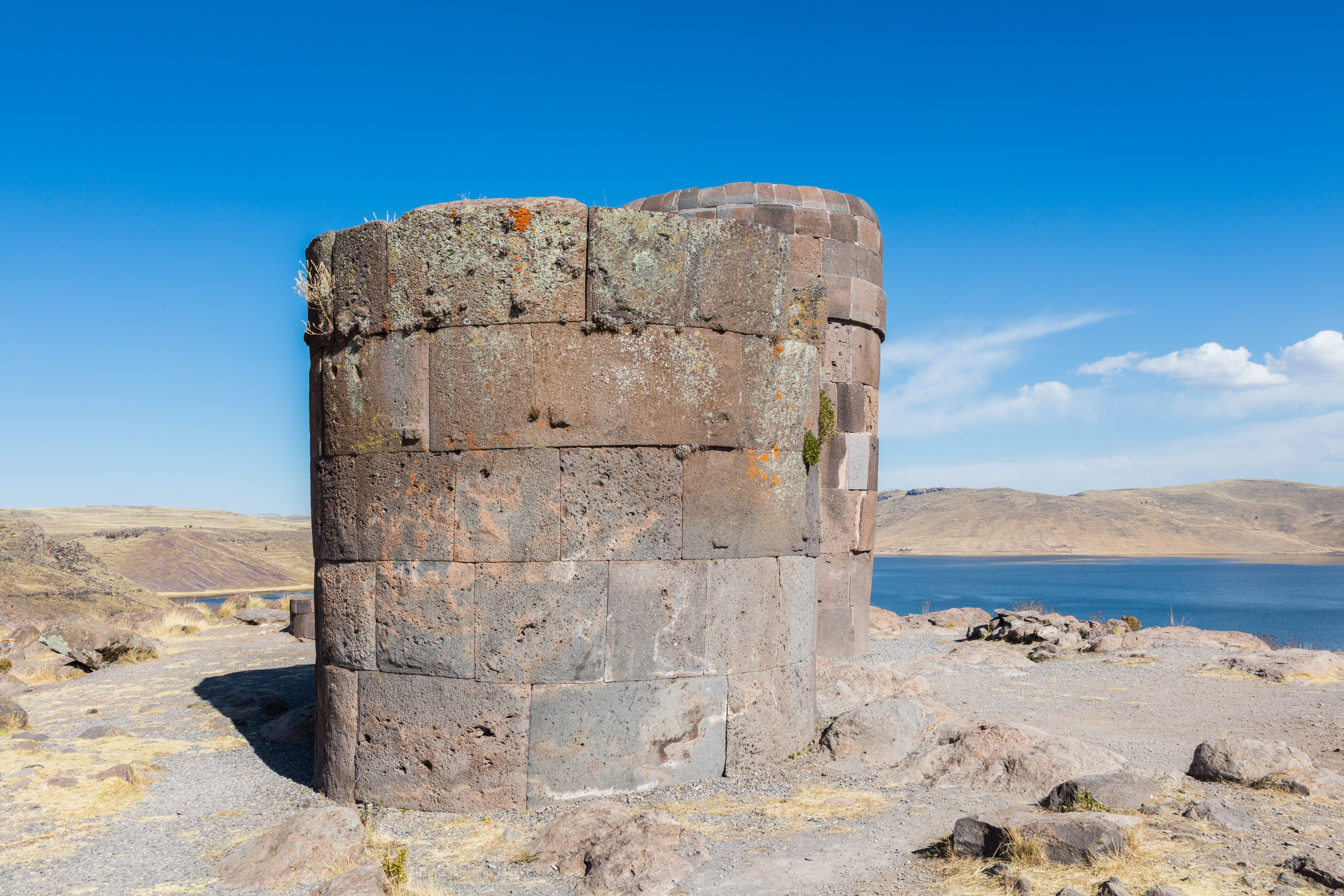
Chullpa from Inca epoch

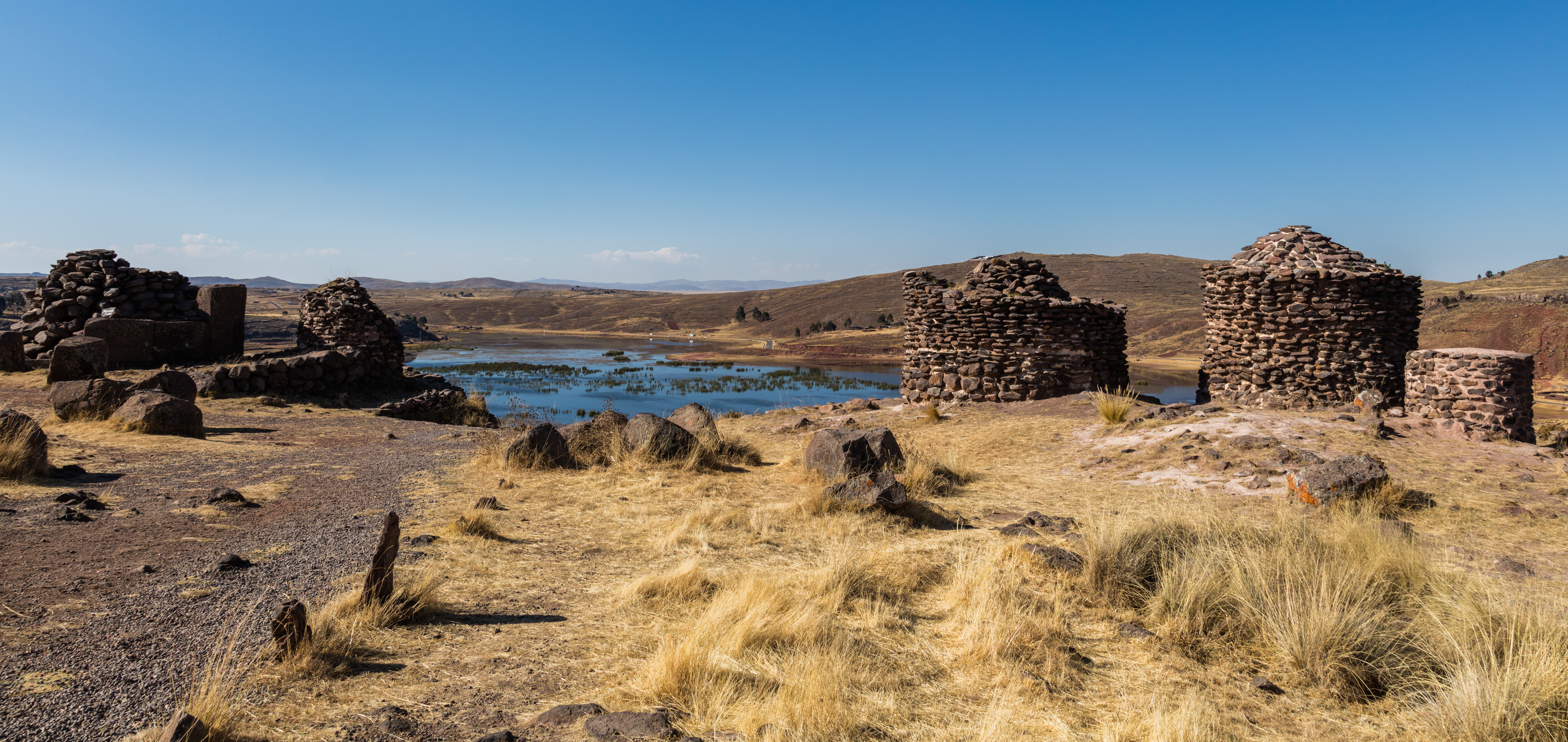
Chullpas from the Tiwanaku epoch

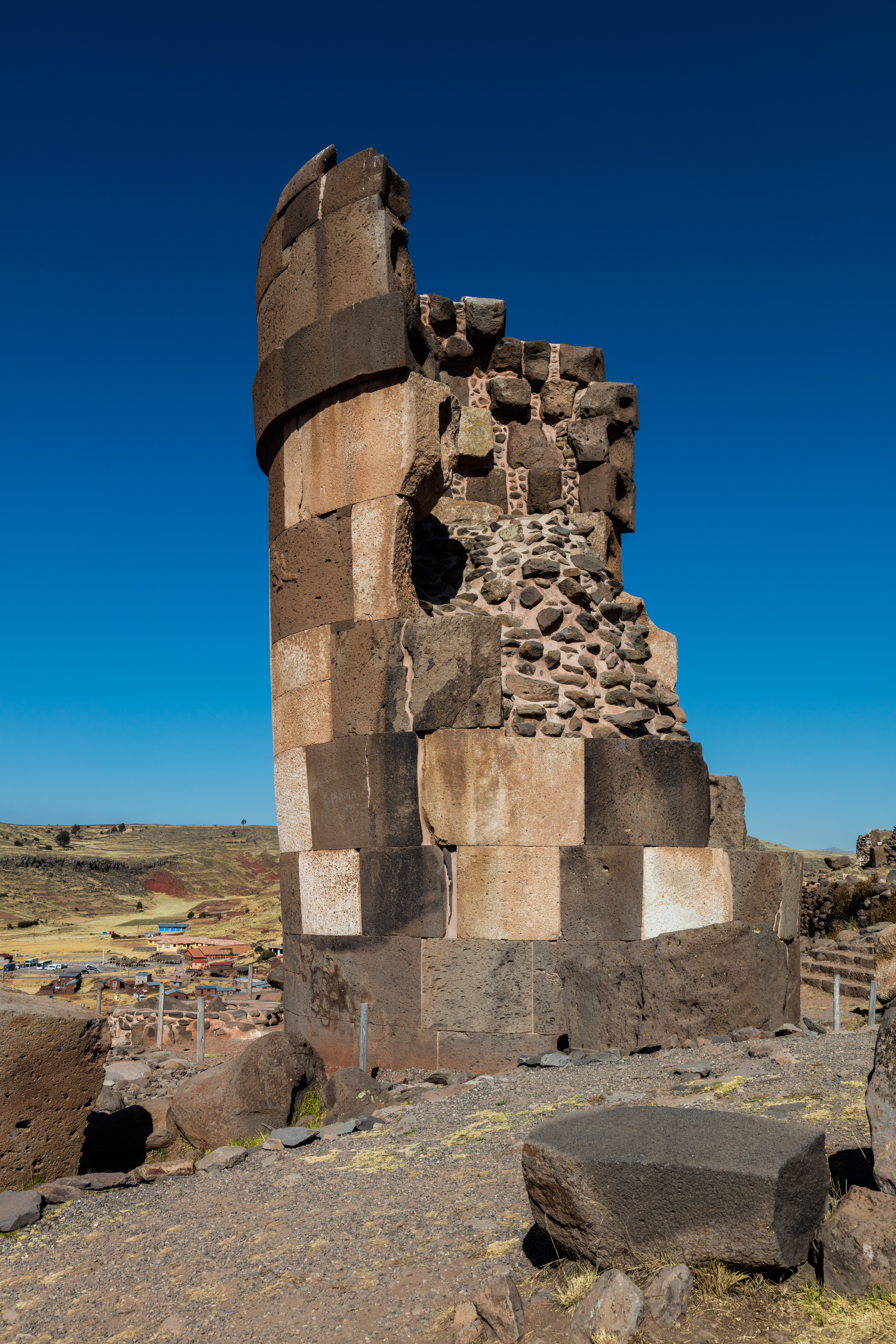
Inside of a chullpa

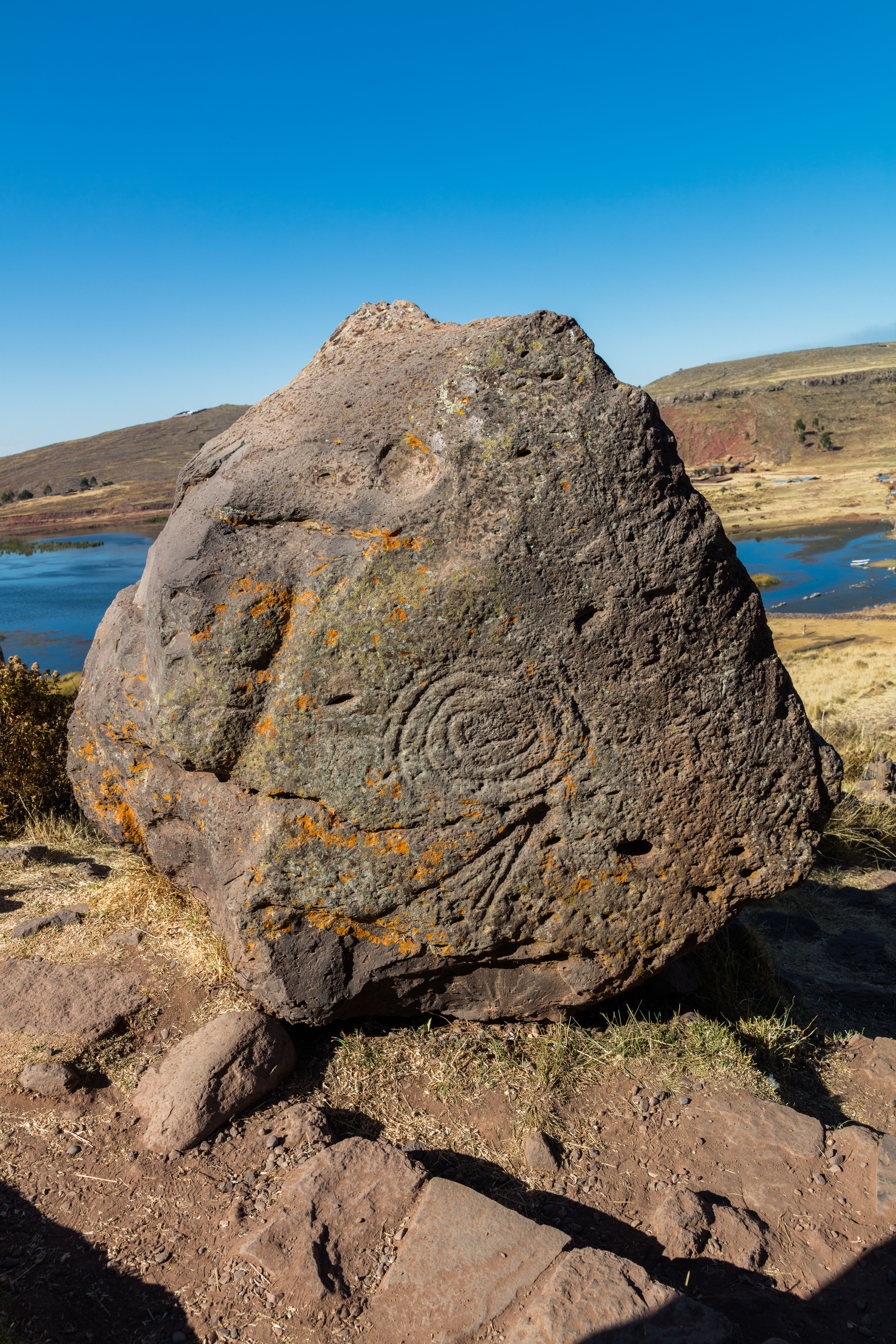
Stone with carvings at the entrance

== Architecture ==
While chullpas are not unique to Sillustani and are found across the Altiplano, this site is considered the best and most preserved example of them. A large ramp on one of the chullpas demonstrates how stones would have been stacked upon the walls during construction. A sign here notes that a few large stones were found on a ramp leading to an unfinished chullpa.. Father Cobo saw Inca builders using a similar ramp in the construction of the Cusco Cathedral. Some of the chullpas have undergone modern restoration, including during a 2005 project directed by the archaeologist Eduardo Arizaca Medina, where they constructed wooden ramps and used pry bars to move and position the stones.

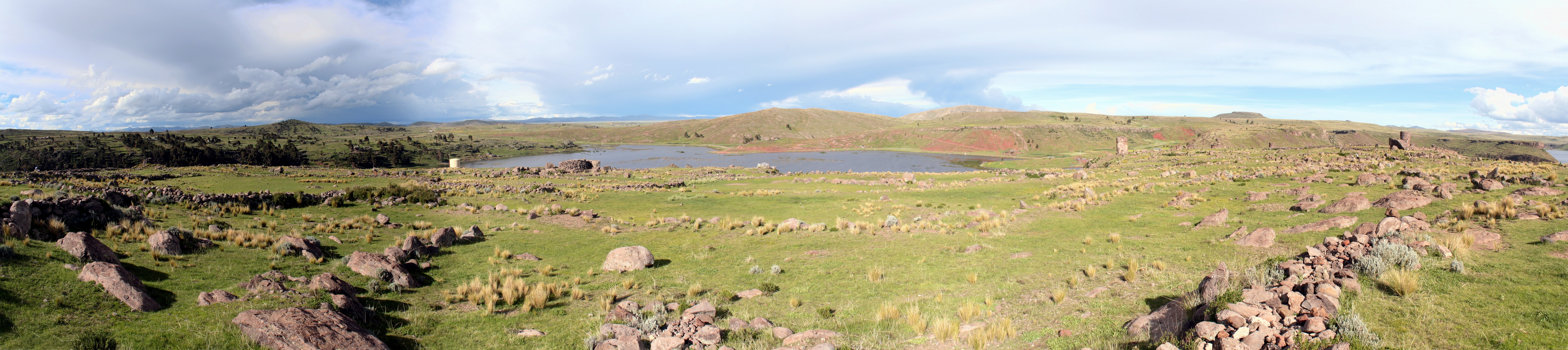
Overview
