= Chamacane =

Mountain in Peru

- Location within Peru

Highest point
- Elevation: 4,800 m (15,700 ft)
- Coordinates: 14°34′41″S 70°07′29″W

Geography
- Location: Peru, Puno Region, Azángaro Province
- Parent range: Andes

Chamacane (possibly from Aymara ch'amaka dark, darkness, -ni a suffix to indicate ownership, "the one with dark color") is a mountain in the Peruvian Andes, about 4,800 metres (15,748 ft) high. It is located in the Puno Region, Azángaro Province, on the border of the districts Muñani and San Antón. It lies northwest of the mountain Surupana and south of Alcamarine.

Chamacane is situated at the river Quellhuiri which originates northwest of the mountain. It flows to the south.
