= Lake Arapa =

Lake in Puno, Peru

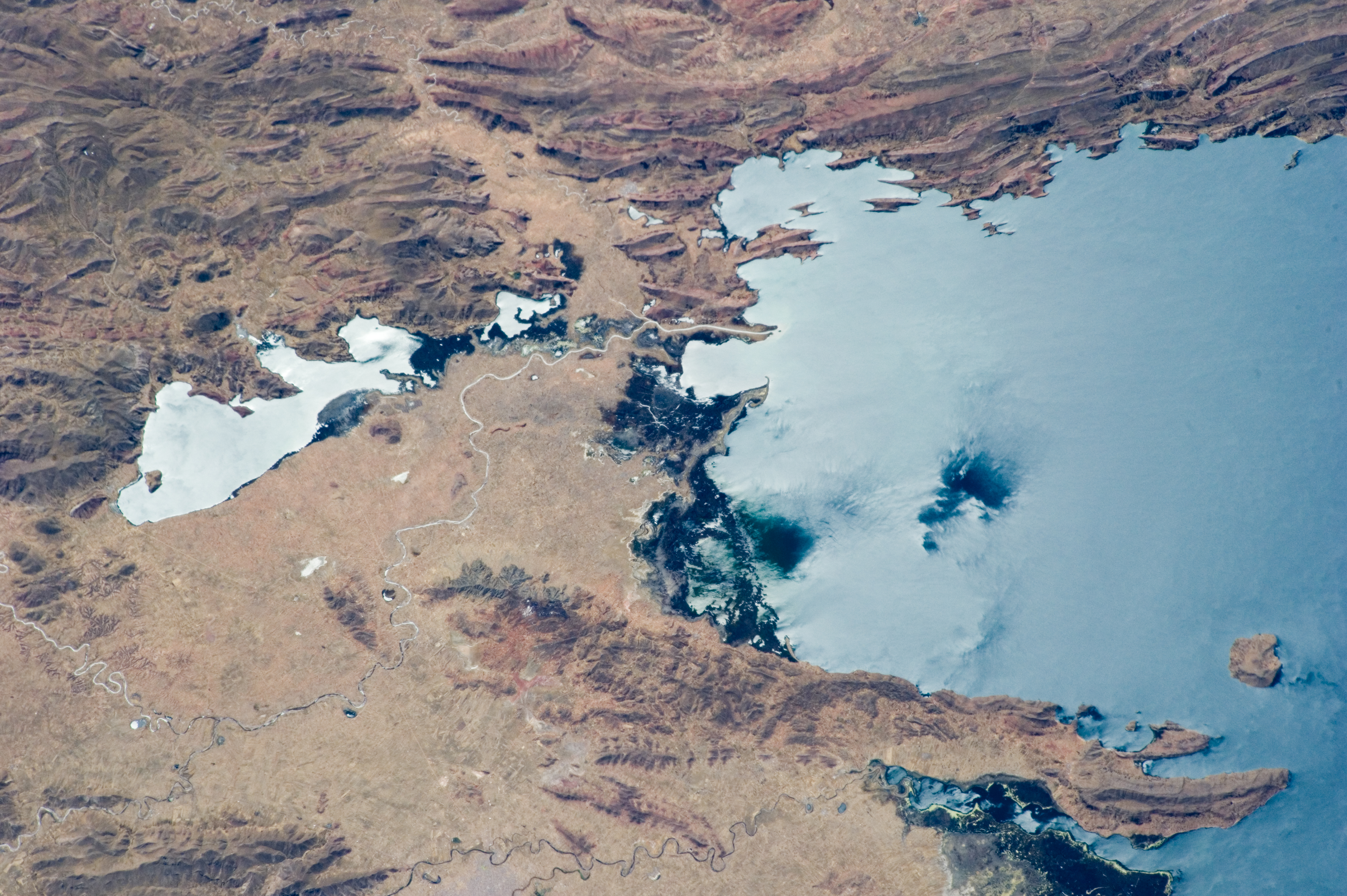
- Northwestern Lake Titicaca and Lake Arapa (on the left) as seen from the ISS

- Location within Peru
- Location: Puno Region, Azángaro Province, Arapa District, Chupa District
- Coordinates: 15°10′59″S 69°58′10″W
- Basin countries: Peru

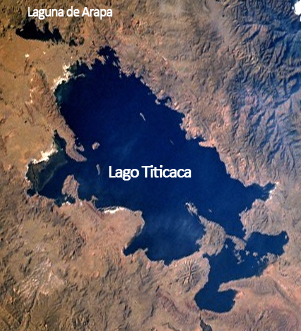
Satellite map of Lake Arapa, close to Lake Titicaca.

Lake Arapa (Spanish: Laguna de Arapa) is a Peruvian lake situated in the Arapa and Chupa Districts in the Azángaro Province of the Puno Region. It is located 40 km from Juliaca.

== See also ==
- List of lakes in Peru
