= Huancané (disambiguation) =

Huancané can refer to a city, a district and a province in Peru.

For the use of the term in a specific setting, see:

- Huancané for the town in Peru.
- Huancané District for the district in the Huancané province.
- Huancané Province for the province in Puno.
