= Uqi Apachita =

Mountain in Peru

- Location within Peru

Highest point
- Elevation: 4,800 m (15,700 ft)
- Coordinates: 14°29′58″S 70°07′41″W

Geography
- Location: Peru, Puno Region, Azángaro Province
- Parent range: Andes

Uqi Apachita (Aymara uqi brown, grey brown, Quechua uqi lead-colored, lead, Aymara apachita the place of transit of an important pass in the principal routes of the Andes; name in the Andes for a stone cairn, a little pile of rocks built along the trail in the high mountains, Hispanicized spelling Uqui Apacheta) is a mountain in the Peruvian Andes, about 4,800 metres (15,748 ft) high. It is located in the Puno Region, Azángaro Province, on the border of the districts Muñani and San Antón. Uqi Apachita lies northeast of the mountain Yuraq Apachita and southeast of Ichhu Muruq'u and Ch'iyar Jaqhi.
