= Alcamarine (Peru) =

Mountain in Peru

- Location within Peru

Highest point
- Elevation: 4,800 m (15,700 ft)
- Coordinates: 14°34′04″S 70°07′39″W

Geography
- Location: Peru, Puno Region
- Parent range: Andes

Alcamarine (possibly from Aymara and Quechua allqamari "mountain caracara", -ni a suffix to indicate ownership, "the one with the mountain caracara") is a mountain in the Peruvian Andes, about 4,800 metres (15,748 ft) high. It is located in the Puno Region, Azángaro Province, on the border of the districts of Muñani and San Antón. It lies northwest of Surupana and north of Chamacane.

Alcamarine is situated at the Quellhuiri which originates northwest of the mountain. It flows to the south.
