= Richard Hancco =

Richard Hancco Soncco
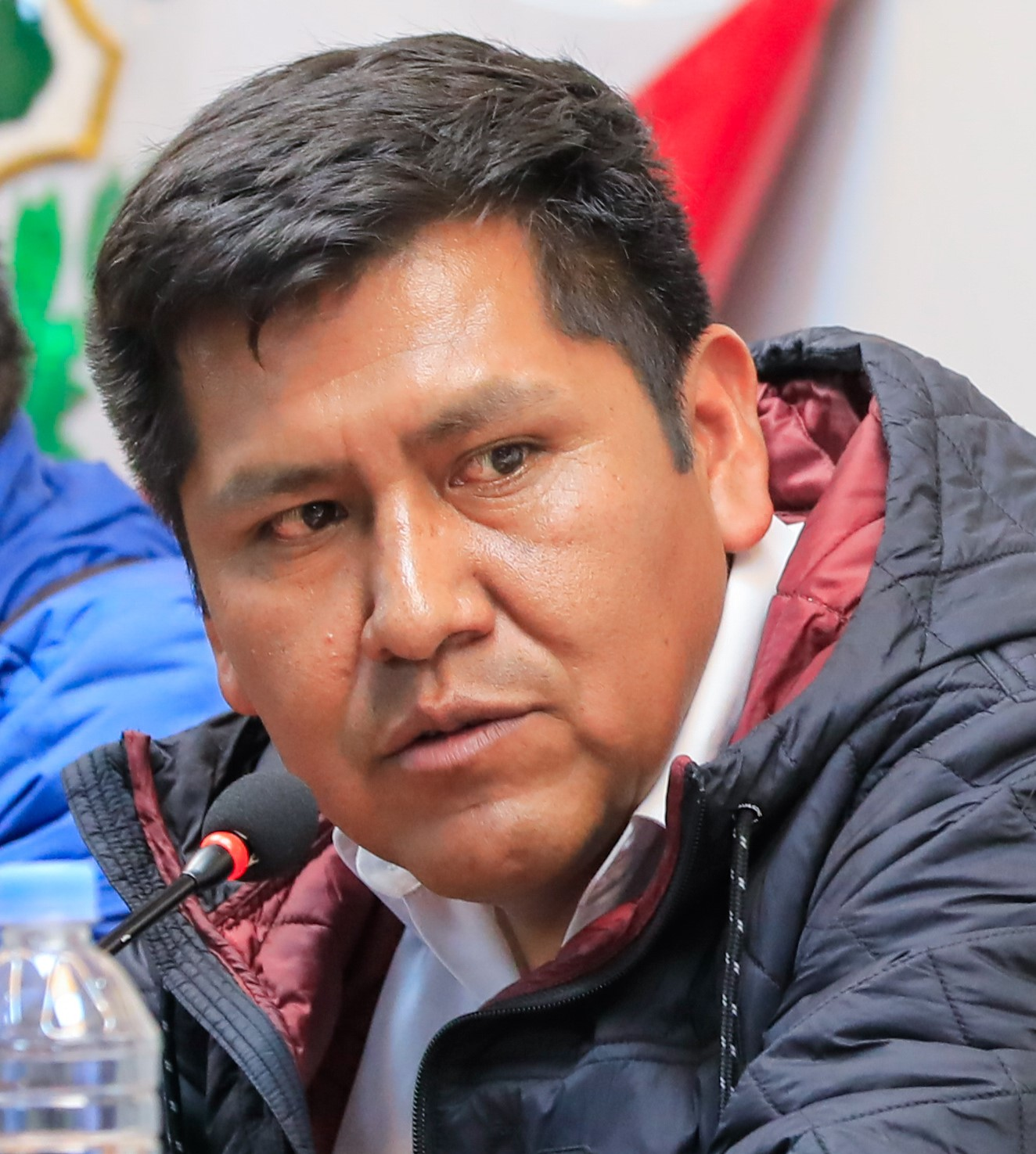

Governor of Puno
- Incumbent
- Assumed office January 1, 2023
- Preceded by: German Alejo Apaza

Personal details
- Born: Richard Hancco Soncco; September 28, 1978 (age 48) San Juan de Salinas, Azangaro, Puno, Peru
- Education: Universidad Nacional del Altiplano de Puno; Nestor Caceres Velazquez Andean University
- Profession: Lawyer, politician

Richard Hancco Soncco (born 28 September 1978) is a Peruvian lawyer and politician who is currently serving as the governor of the Department of Puno since 2023.

== Biography ==
Hancco was born on September 28, 1978, in San Juan de Salinas District, Azángaro, Peru. He first entered politics while studying at the Universidad Nacional del Altiplano de Puno in Puno, Peru. When the threat of Maoist groups forced the Peruvian government under Alberto Fujimori to militarize universities, Hancco mobilized protests against carding of students and against the government's killing of Altiplano student Edy Johny Quilca Cruz.

When Hancco graduated from Altiplano in 2005 and law school at Nestor Caceres Velazquez Andean University in 2013, he began serving in various law offices across Puno region. The highest office he worked in was the Specialized Prosecutor's Office for Anti-Corruption Crimes in Puno. While initially his goal was to become a judge, he failed an evaluation by the National Council of the Judiciary. The head of the council at the time who failed Hancco eventually was at the heart of a major corruption case in the region, spurring Hancco to run for regional office. He first ran for office in 2018 under Democracia Directa, but switched to FADEP.

On October 2, 2022, Hancco defeated Jhomar Tonconi to become the regional governor of Puno. Hancco received 35.7% of the votes, and Tonconi received 22.7%. Hancco ran on a platform aiming to provide more public health availability in the region, increase food exports, and bring monetary poverty down from 42.7 to 35%. His platform was largely anti-corruption, and he supported indigenous Peruvian groups. Despite this, corruption was rampant in regional and local offices throughout Puno under Hancco. During the Puno crisis that began in 2023, Hancco supported the protesters. While marching with protesters, Hancco called on Peruvian president Dina Boluarte to resign.
