= Pedro Vilcapaza =

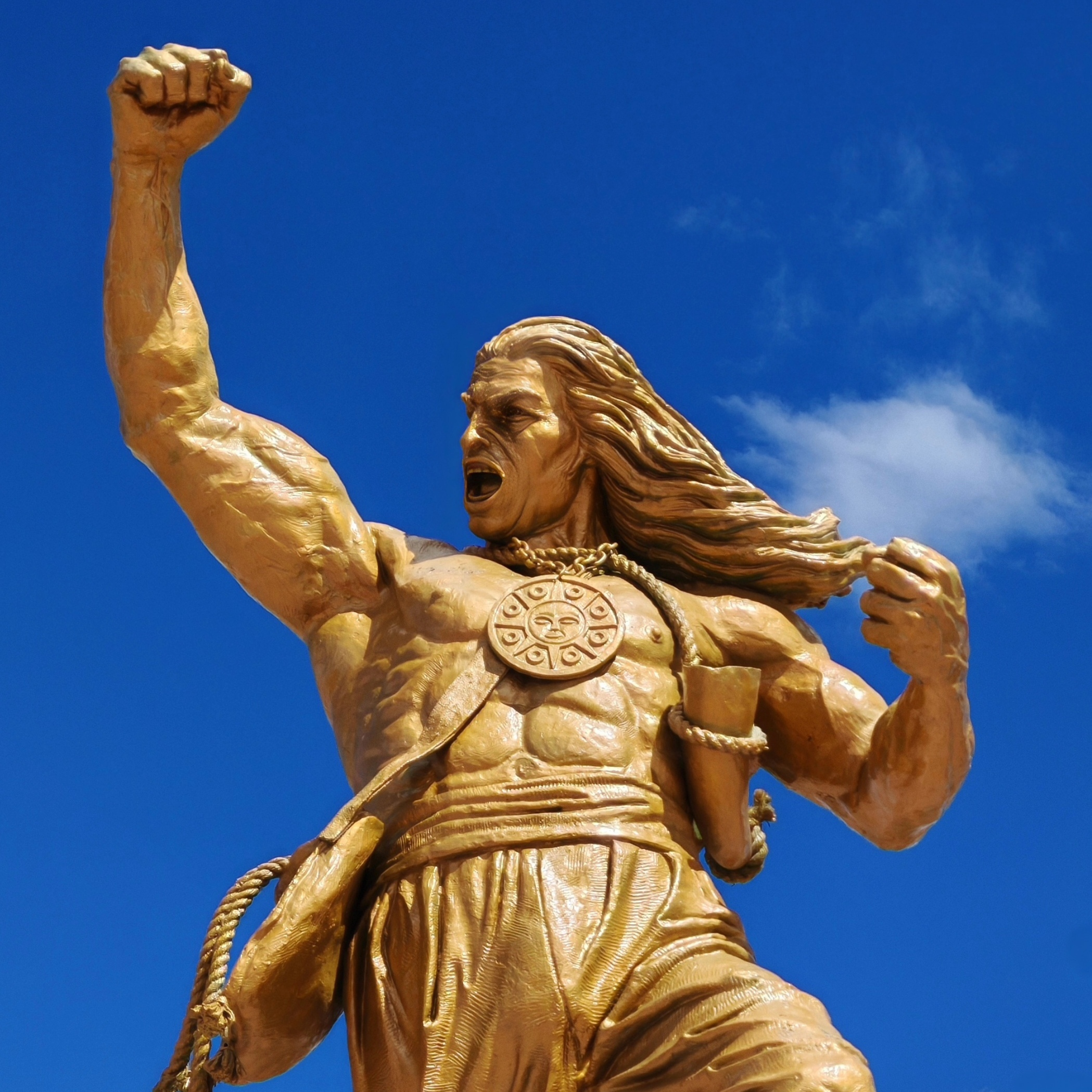
- Born: June 1741; Azángaro, Viceroyalty of Peru
- Died: 8 April 1782 (aged 40) Azángaro, Viceroyalty of Peru
- Cause of death: Execution
- Allegiance: Inca Empire
- Rank: General
- Conflicts: Rebellion of Túpac Amaru II: Siege of Cuzco; Siege of Sorata; Second Siege of Sorata
- Spouse: Manuela Copacondori Choquehuanca (m. 1771)

Pedro Vilcapaza Alarcón (June 1741 – 8 April 1782) was a prominent indigenous rebel leader in the Rebellion of Túpac Amaru II. He led the siege of Sorata together with Túpac Amaru II's nephew, Andrés Túpac Amaru.

== Early life ==
Pedro Vilcapaza Alarcón, known as the "Untamed Puma," was born in Morco Orco, 20 kilometers from Azángaro, in June 1741. His parents were Cleto Vilcapaza and Juana Alarcón. He was the second son and had several siblings: Toribio, Pedro, Gerónimo, Francisco, Manuel, and Antonia. Through his father, he descended from the caciques of Azángaro, and on his mother's side, he descended from the Spanish captain and encomendero Martín Alarcón.

Due to his mixed-race heritage and the influence of his maternal family, he gained admission to the Royal College of San Bernardo in Cusco, later completing his education at the San Francisco de Borja College. Upon finishing his studies, he joined the Royal Army of Peru as a soldier, eventually reaching the rank of cavalry sergeant.

On March 30, 1762, when he was 22 years old, he participated as a witness in the trial of the inhabitants of Moro Orco against the chief Diego Choquehuanca for the constant abuses of the latter against the indigenous people.

In August 1771, he returned to his homeland to dedicate himself to trade, achieving prosperity primarily through the transport of silver between Potosí and Cusco, a route that allowed him to forge a friendship with José Gabriel Condorcanqui. That year, he married Manuela Copacondori Choquehuanca, niece of the cacique Diego Choquehuanca. The marriage was childless, and Manuela soon left her husband. Some writings record a woman named Rosario as Vilcapaza's partner; they had a daughter named Leonarda.

== Rebellion and execution ==
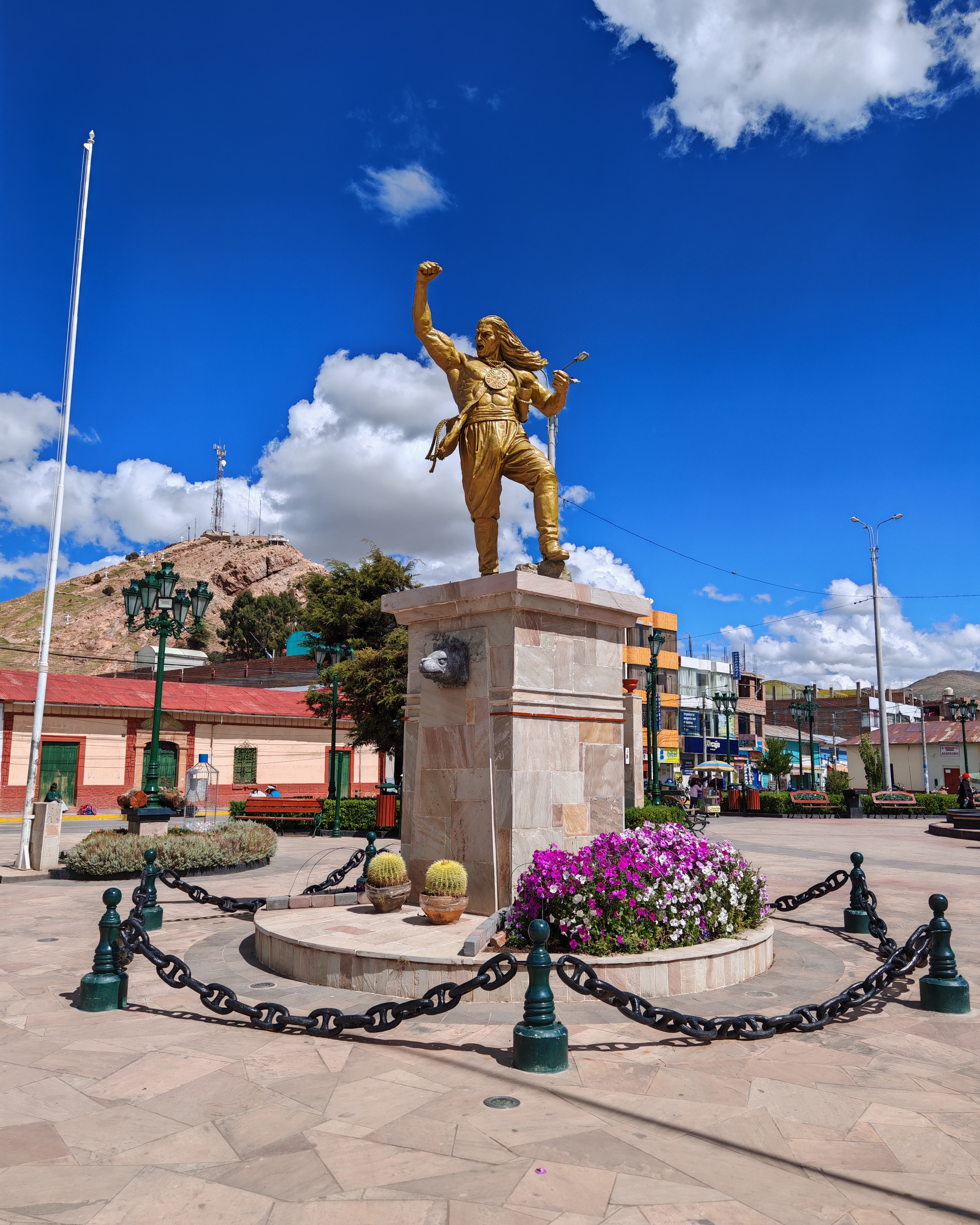
Monument dedicated to Pedro Vilcapaza in the Plaza de Armas of Azángaro, the same location in which he was executed.

In November 1780, he joined the indigenous Rebellion of Túpac Amaru II, raiding several haciendas belonging to Spanish landowners and also to indigenous chieftains who did not support the movement. During this period, he received support from his brother Manuel and his uncle Julián Vilcapaza. In January 1781, he established himself as a rebel strategist, continuing the uprising in the southern provinces of Cuzco and the Altiplano. The insurgent leadership set its sights on capturing Sorata, for which purpose columns from Cuzco and Azángaro departed under his command and that of veteran military leaders Miguel Bastidas and Andrés Túpac Amaru. However, Sorata could not be taken in this first attempt.

On May 4, 1781, the second siege of Sorata began, led by 20,000 indigenous soldiers. To overcome the city's resistance, the strategy of damming the river was employed, directing its waters against the defenses. Vilcapaza's forces spread out in Southern Peru, achieving many victories.

To provoke the rebels' desertion, they offered a pardon and finally defeated Vilcapaza at Condorcuyo. He retreated to Puno and Huancané, and at the end of 1781, the rebels who accepted the pardon signed a capitulation agreement. However, Vilcapaza refused to surrender and rose up again in Azángaro. After successive actions against the Spanish, he finally fell into their hands. Pedro Vilcapaza was executed on April 8, 1782, as similar to Túpac Amaru II who was executed a year before, he was quartered by eight horses. He addressed his people with the phrase, "By this sun that shines upon us, learn to die as I have."
