= Quri Kunka =

Mountain in Peru

- Location within Peru

Highest point
- Elevation: 4,600 m (15,100 ft)
- Coordinates: 14°28′34″S 70°12′40″W

Geography
- Location: Peru, Puno Region, Azángaro Province
- Parent range: Andes

Quri Kunka (Quechua quri gold, kunka throat, gullet, "gold throat" or "gold gullet", Hispanicized spelling Joricunca) is a mountain in the Peruvian Andes, about 4,600 metres (15,092 ft) high. It is located in the Puno Region, Azángaro Province, San Antón District. Quri Kunka lies southwest of the mountain Ichhu Muruq'u and northwest of Yuraq Apachita.
