= Potoni District =

Coordinates: 14°20′10″S 70°06′01″W

Potoni Putuni
- District
- Interactive map of Potoni
- Country: Peru
- Region: Puno
- Province: Azángaro
- Founded: May 2, 1854
- Capital: Potoni

Government
  - Mayor: Seferino Quispe Turpo

Area
  - Total: 602.95 km^{2} (232.80 sq mi)
- Elevation: 4,148 m (13,609 ft)

Population (2005 census)
  - Total: 6,242
  - Density: 10.35/km^{2} (26.81/sq mi)
- Time zone: UTC-5 (PET)
- UBIGEO: 210209

Potoni District is one of fifteen districts of the Azángaro Province in Peru.

== Geography ==
One of the highest peaks of the district is Taruja Pincha at approximately 4,800 m (15,700 ft). Other mountains are listed below:

- Aqu Muruq'u
- Ch'iyar Jaqhi
- Huch'uy Ananta
- Ichhu Muruq'u
- Kimsa Tira
- Kukawi Pata
- Kuntur Ikiña
- Kuntur Sayana
- Llallawi
- Pumani
- P'isaqani Punta
- Qinamari
- Qullqani
- Qullqi Kancha
- Qullqiri
- Q'atawi
- Q'atawi Qullu
- Sach'a Tira
- Sapan Qullu
- Sullukuta
- Sura Tira
- Tiya Wanaku
- Warmi Sirka
- Wayna Putus
- Wila Sirka
- Wila Warmi
- Yana Urqu

== Ethnic groups ==
The people in the district are mainly indigenous citizens of Quechua descent. Quechua is the language which the majority of the population (91.95%) learnt to speak in childhood, 7.92% of the residents started speaking using the Spanish language (2007 Peru Census).
