= Saman District =

Coordinates: 15°14′17″S 69°59′43″W

Saman
- District
- Interactive map of Saman
- Country: Peru
- Region: Puno
- Province: Azángaro
- Capital: Saman

Government
  - Mayor: Luis Mamani Gonzales

Area
  - Total: 188.59 km^{2} (72.82 sq mi)
- Elevation: 3,830 m (12,570 ft)

Population (2005 census)
  - Total: 12,938
  - Density: 68.604/km^{2} (177.68/sq mi)
- Time zone: UTC-5 (PET)
- UBIGEO: 210210

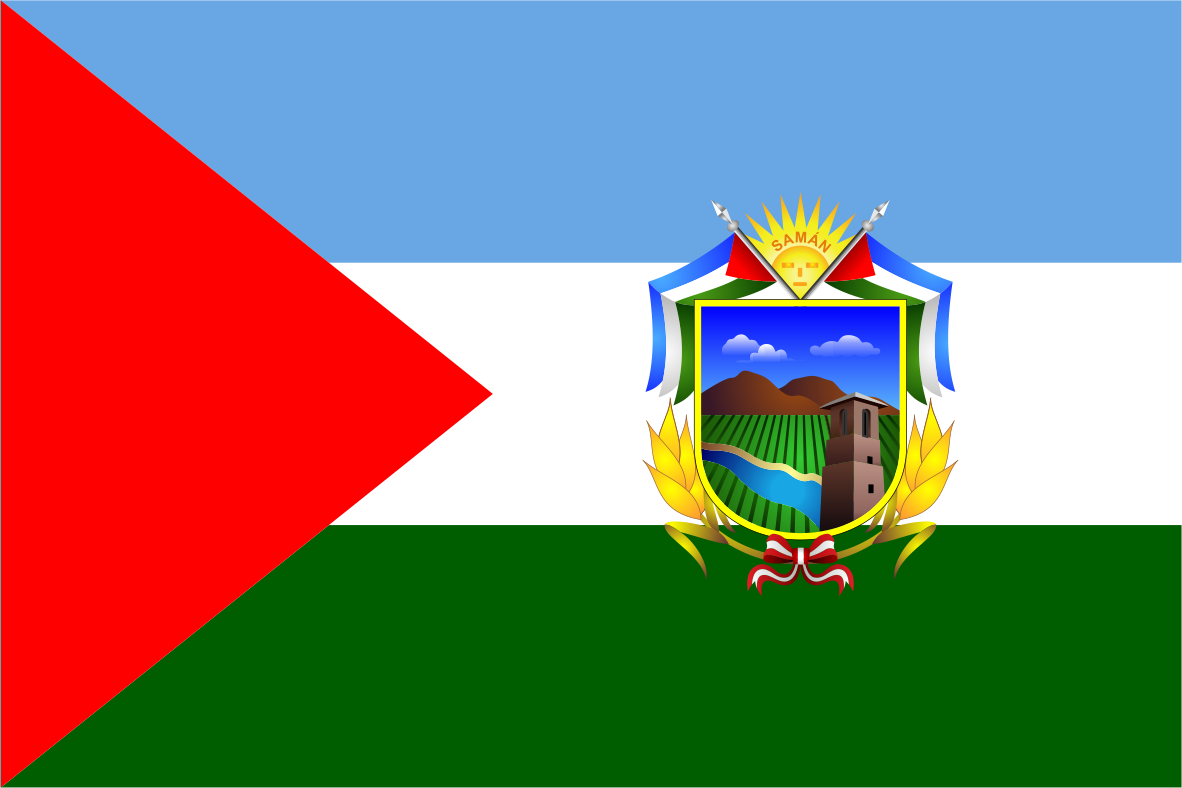
Flag of Samán

Saman District is one of fifteen districts of the province Azángaro in Peru.

== Ethnic groups ==
The people in the district are mainly indigenous citizens of Quechua descent. Quechua is the language which the majority of the population (92.38%) learnt to speak in childhood, while 6.41% of the residents started speaking using the Spanish language (2007 Peru Census).
