= Cojata District =

Coordinates: 15°05′59″S 69°31′34″W

Cojata
- District
- Interactive map of Cojata
- Country: Peru
- Region: Puno
- Province: Huancané
- Capital: Cojata

Government
  - Mayor: Hector Exaltacion Montesinos Aliaga

Area
  - Total: 881.18 km^{2} (340.23 sq mi)
- Elevation: 4,355 m (14,288 ft)

Population (2005 census)
  - Total: 4,902
  - Density: 5.563/km^{2} (14.41/sq mi)
- Time zone: UTC-5 (PET)
- UBIGEO: 210602

Cojata District is one of eight districts of the province Huancané in Peru.

== Geography ==
One of the highest peaks of the district is Khawayuni at approximately 5,000 m (16,000 ft). Other mountains are listed below:

- Apachita
- Awqani
- Janq'u Qala
- Jichu Qullu
- Juri Quta
- Laram Sillani
- Lawa Lawani
- Maych'ani
- Limani
- Mullu Marka
- Muru Qullu
- Pukara
- Qillwani
- Waraq Tira

== Ethnic groups ==
The people in the district are mainly indigenous citizens of Aymara descent. Aymara is the language which the majority of the population (89.09%) learnt to speak in childhood, 8.97% of the residents started speaking using the Spanish language (2007 Peru Census).

== Climate ==
Climate data for Cojata, elevation 4,347 m (14,262 ft), (1991–2020)
Month	Jan	Feb	Mar	Apr	May	Jun	Jul	Aug	Sep	Oct	Nov	Dec	Year
Mean daily maximum °C (°F)	12.1 (53.8)	12.1 (53.8)	12.3 (54.1)	12.5 (54.5)	12.5 (54.5)	12.3 (54.1)	12.1 (53.8)	12.8 (55.0)	13.1 (55.6)	13.1 (55.6)	13.7 (56.7)	12.6 (54.7)	12.6 (54.7)
Mean daily minimum °C (°F)	1.2 (34.2)	1.4 (34.5)	0.7 (33.3)	−1.4 (29.5)	−4.8 (23.4)	−8.4 (16.9)	−9.8 (14.4)	−9.4 (15.1)	−5.9 (21.4)	−2.9 (26.8)	−1.3 (29.7)	0.4 (32.7)	−3.3 (26.0)
Average precipitation mm (inches)	130.4 (5.13)	111.2 (4.38)	96.5 (3.80)	48.7 (1.92)	14.2 (0.56)	6.7 (0.26)	7.6 (0.30)	14.4 (0.57)	30.6 (1.20)	62.8 (2.47)	62.4 (2.46)	94.6 (3.72)	680.1 (26.77)
Source: National Meteorology and Hydrology Service of Peru
