= Pusi District =

Coordinates: 15.4423°S 69.9311°W

Pusi
- District
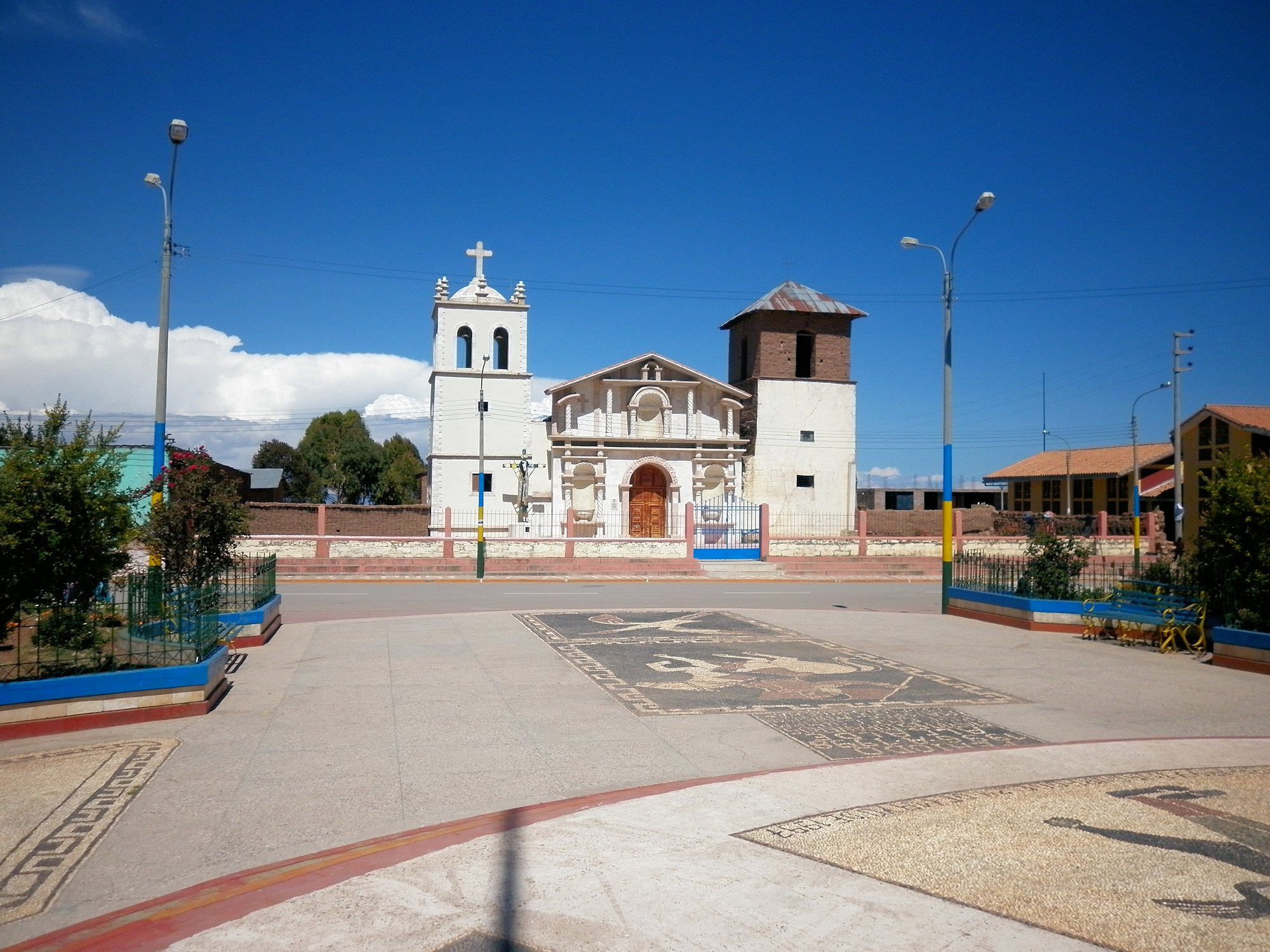
- Church of Pusi
- Interactive map of Pusi
- Country: Peru
- Region: Puno
- Province: Huancané
- Capital: Pusi

Government
  - Mayor: Elias Quiroga Gutierrez

Area
  - Total: 148.42 km^{2} (57.31 sq mi)
- Elevation: 3,835 m (12,582 ft)

Population (2005 census)
  - Total: 7,132
  - Density: 48.05/km^{2} (124.5/sq mi)
- Time zone: UTC-5 (PET)
- UBIGEO: 210605

Pusi District is one of eight districts of the province Huancané in Peru.

== Ethnic groups ==
The people in the district are mainly indigenous citizens of Quechua descent. Quechua is the language which the majority of the population (93.57%) learnt to speak in childhood, 5.85% of the residents started speaking using the Spanish language (2007 Peru Census).
