= Rosaspata =

Rosaspata may refer to:

- Rosaspata District
- Vitcos, the Inca city now called the ruins of Rosaspata.
