= Awki awki =

Bolivian-Peruvian folkdance

Awki awki (Aymara awki father / gentleman, the reduplication signifies that there is a group of something) is a folk dance performed in the La Paz Department of Bolivia and in the Huancané Province of Peru. The dance satirizes the Spanish conquerors of the colonial period.

== See also ==
- P'aquchi
