= Inchupalla District =

Coordinates: 15.0060°S 69.9633°W

Inchupalla
- District
- Interactive map of Inchupalla
- Country: Peru
- Region: Puno
- Province: Huancané
- Capital: Inchupalla

Government
  - Mayor: Juan Sucasaire Aquise

Area
  - Total: 289.03 km^{2} (111.60 sq mi)
- Elevation: 3,932 m (12,900 ft)

Population (2005 census)
  - Total: 3,848
  - Density: 13.31/km^{2} (34.48/sq mi)
- Time zone: UTC-5 (PET)
- UBIGEO: 210604

Inchupalla District is one of eight districts of the province Huancané in Peru.

== Ethnic groups ==
The people in the district are mainly indigenous citizens of Aymara descent. Aymara is the language which the majority of the population (92.65%) learnt to speak in childhood, 6.24% of the residents started speaking using the Spanish language (2007 Peru Census).
