= Hatun Qurini =

Mountain in Peru

- Location within Peru

Highest point
- Elevation: 5,000 m (16,000 ft)
- Coordinates: 14°37′30″S 70°07′12″W

Geography
- Location: Peru, Puno Region
- Parent range: Andes

Hatun Qurini (Quechua hatun big, Aymara chuqi, quri (<Quechua) gold, -ni a suffix to indicate ownership, "the big one with gold", Hispanicized spelling Jatún Corini) is a mountain in the Peruvian Andes, about 5,000 metres (16,404 ft) high. It is situated in the Puno Region, Azángaro Province, San José District. Hatun Qurini lies northwest of the mountain Surupana.
