= Huatasani District =

Coordinates: 15.0546°S 69.8115°W

Huatasani
- District
- Interactive map of Huatasani
- Country: Peru
- Region: Puno
- Province: Huancané
- Founded: June 21, 1967
- Capital: Huatasani

Government
  - Mayor: Miguel Condori Condori

Area
  - Total: 106.73 km^{2} (41.21 sq mi)
- Elevation: 3,830 m (12,570 ft)

Population (2005 census)
  - Total: 2,912
  - Density: 27.28/km^{2} (70.66/sq mi)
- Time zone: UTC-5 (PET)
- UBIGEO: 210603

Huatasani District is one of eight districts of the province Huancané in Peru.

== Ethnic groups ==
The district straddles the Quechua and Aymara linguistic boundary with Aymara-speaking Huancane to the south and Quechua-speaking Putina to the north. Huatasani itself is predominantly Quechua speaking but contains both Quechua- and Aymara-speaking communities. Quechua is the language which 53.87% of the population learnt to speak in childhood, 28.84% of the residents started speaking using Aymara and 17.20% learnt Spanish as the first language (2007 Peru Census).
