= Santiago de Pupuja District =

Coordinates: 15°03′20″S 70°16′41″W

Santiago de Pupuja
- District
- Interactive map of Santiago de Pupuja
- Country: Peru
- Region: Puno
- Province: Azángaro
- Capital: Santiago de Pupuja

Government
  - Mayor: Jaime Roger Yapo Arapa

Area
  - Total: 301.27 km^{2} (116.32 sq mi)
- Elevation: 3,860 m (12,660 ft)

Population (2005 census)
  - Total: 6,640
  - Density: 22.0/km^{2} (57.1/sq mi)
- Time zone: UTC-5 (PET)
- UBIGEO: 210214

Santiago de Pupuja District is one of fifteen districts of the province Azángaro in Peru.

== Ethnic groups ==
The people in the district are mainly indigenous citizens of Quechua descent. Quechua is the language which the majority of the population (94.87%) learnt to speak in childhood, 4.69% of the residents started speaking using the Spanish language (2007 Peru Census).
