= Azángaro =

- Town
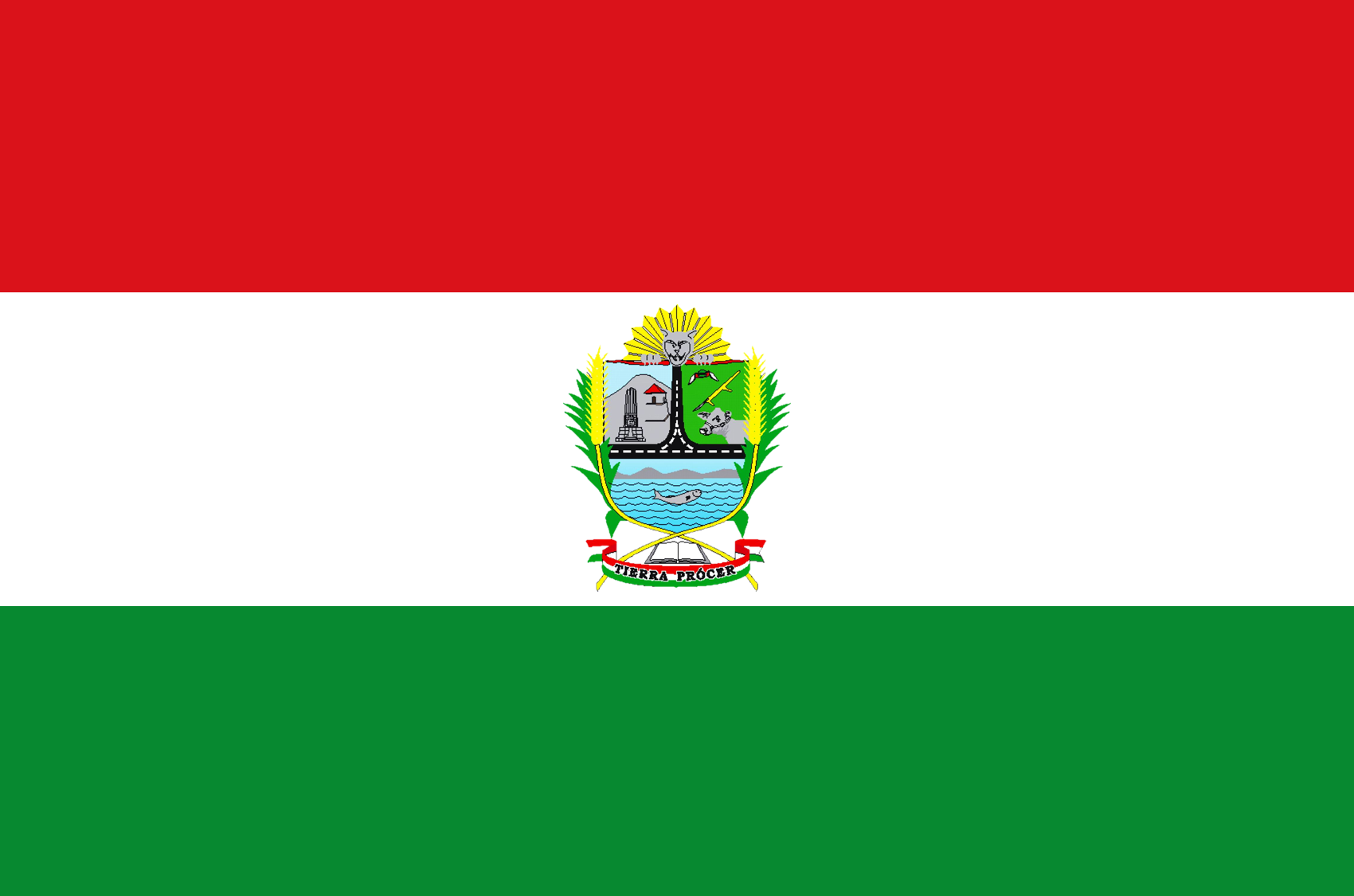
- Flag

- Location within Peru
- Coordinates: 14°54′35.60″S 70°11′50.70″W
- Country: Peru
- Region: Puno
- Province: Azángaro
- District: Azángaro
- Demonym: Azangarino(a)

Government
  - Mayor: Ruben Pachari Inofuente

Area
  - Total: 533.47 km^{2} (205.97 sq mi)
- Elevation: 3,850 m (12,630 ft)

Population (2012)
  - Total: 28,526
  - Density: 30.55/km^{2} (79.1/sq mi)
- Time zone: UTC-5 (PET)
- Website: www.muniazangaro.gob.pe

Azángaro is a town in Southern Peru, capital of the province Azángaro in the region of Puno.

The colonial church in Azangaro is known as the golden temple. In the adjacent Plaza San Bernardo, Pedro Vilca Apaza was drawn and quartered for his role as a General in Tupac Amaru II's attempt to liberate Perú from the Spanish government. His last words were, "Por este Sol aprended a morir como yo." After Tupac Amaru II's execution, leadership of the revolution shifted to Azangaro.

The church bell tower, an example of colonial decorative adobe, was much disfigured by rains before recent rains caused a collapse of most of the tower. The gold interior is a magnificent example of rich colonial art. Recently, colonial treasures were robbed from the church.

== History ==
Azángaro was "discovered" by Captain Don Manuel Ortiz Aguilar on November 1535. The priest Rodrigo Chrysostom, overseer of the Doctrine of baptism of the Collao Indians in 1535, is the first to report on the existence Azángaro, which was located in the place called Macaya and there an idol of a cat whose eyes were rubies was worshiped. When Christians brought indoctrination to this place, the doctrine of "Our Lady of the Rosary" was founded and a small church was built in the orders of the Dominico Father Tomas de San Martin and Acosta (the same who founded the University of San Marcos) and cacique Fabian Mango.

The arrival of the Spanish in Azángaro occurs in 1535. In 1542 the Viceroyalty of Peru covering 3 states are created: Lima, La Plata and Chile, this time Azángaro and Puno belong to this Viceroyalty.

Already in the Republican Era, in 1825, by the law of February 5 Azángaro is elevated to city status. In 1825, by the law of June 21 Azángaro was created as the capital of the province of the same name with its 18 districts: Achaya, Arapa, Asillo, Caminaca, Azángaro, etc.

== Demography ==
=== Population ===
In terms of population, Azángaro is the fourth city of the department of Puno, with 12.6% of the total population. According to estimated and projected population for 2012 it has a total of 28,526 inhabitants. The most populated district is Azángaro, and a density of 41.99 inhabitants per km2, accounting for 21.68% of the total population.

=== Poverty ===
In the department of Puno, the city of Azángaro is in third place of poverty, and the levels are closely linked to the quality of life of the population, defined as the satisfaction of basic needs. In the province of Azángaro, the quality of life of its population ranks as extremely poor and very poor, according to the Human Poverty Index, and its deficiencies has a rating of 0.6632.

=== Education ===
Azángaro has a total of 397 educational institutions, 96.2% of formal education (kindergarten, elementary, high school and higher). Of these, approximately 68.3% are elementary schools, most of these are concentrated in the districts of Azángaro with 24.7%, Asillo with 13.8% and Arapa and Chupa with 7.3%.

=== Health ===
As for the health service, the province is serviced by 32 establishments which highlights the Hospital de Apoyo, located in the city of Azángaro.

== Economy ==
The economy is based primarily on Azángaro's development of livestock production activities, supplemented by agriculture, crafts, trade in agricultural products, consumer goods and non-regional transportation services. No figures are available regarding the provincial gross domestic product, but it is known that animal exploitation is the largest contributor to the economy by raising cattle, sheep and alpacas, which generate end products such as milk, wool, skins and meat for consumption; also products are obtained for transformation, such as milk for processing into cheese, yogurt for human consumption, sheep, alpaca and llama wool and cow leather.

== Climate ==
Climate data for Azángaro, elevation 3,857 m (12,654 ft), (1991–2020)
Month	Jan	Feb	Mar	Apr	May	Jun	Jul	Aug	Sep	Oct	Nov	Dec	Year
Mean daily maximum °C (°F)	16.3 (61.3)	16.2 (61.2)	16.4 (61.5)	16.7 (62.1)	16.7 (62.1)	16.2 (61.2)	16.2 (61.2)	17.2 (63.0)	18.1 (64.6)	18.3 (64.9)	18.7 (65.7)	17.6 (63.7)	17.1 (62.7)
Mean daily minimum °C (°F)	5.0 (41.0)	5.1 (41.2)	4.3 (39.7)	2.4 (36.3)	−1.4 (29.5)	−4.3 (24.3)	−4.4 (24.1)	−2.8 (27.0)	0.4 (32.7)	2.5 (36.5)	3.4 (38.1)	4.4 (39.9)	1.2 (34.2)
Average precipitation mm (inches)	112.5 (4.43)	97.1 (3.82)	90.6 (3.57)	33.1 (1.30)	7.8 (0.31)	2.6 (0.10)	2.1 (0.08)	8.8 (0.35)	22.0 (0.87)	49.0 (1.93)	53.7 (2.11)	87.8 (3.46)	567.1 (22.33)
Source: National Meteorology and Hydrology Service of Peru

== See also ==
- Ccorpachico
