= Ch'iyar Jaqhi (Azángaro) =

Mountain in Peru

- Location within Peru

Highest point
- Elevation: 4,600 m (15,100 ft)
- Coordinates: 14°27′51″S 70°08′47″W

Geography
- Location: Peru, Puno Region, Azángaro Province
- Parent range: Andes

Ch'iyar Jaqhi (Aymara ch'iyara black, jaqhi precipice, cliff, "black cliff", Hispanicized spelling Chearaje) is a mountain in the Peruvian Andes, about 4,600 metres (15,092 ft) high. It is located in the Puno Region, Azángaro Province, on the border of the districts Potoni and San Antón. Ch'iyar Jaqhi lies northwest of the mountain Uqi Apachita and east of Ichhu Muruq'u.
