= Ccorpachico =

Populated place in Puno Region, Peru

Coordinates: 15°11′00″S 070°12′00″W

Ccorpachico or Ccorpachico Hacienda (or Hacienda Ccorpachico) is a populated place in Puno Region, Peru.

== See also ==
- Azángaro
- Juliaca
- Lampa, Peru
