= Vilque Chico District =

Coordinates: 15.2152°S 69.6905°W

Vilque Chico
- District
- Interactive map of Vilque Chico
- Country: Peru
- Region: Puno
- Province: Huancané
- Capital: Vilque Chico

Government
  - Mayor: Hilario Ramos Salluca

Area
  - Total: 499.38 km^{2} (192.81 sq mi)
- Elevation: 3,825 m (12,549 ft)

Population (2005 census)
  - Total: 9,750
  - Density: 19.5/km^{2} (50.6/sq mi)
- Time zone: UTC-5 (PET)
- UBIGEO: 210608

Vilque Chico District is one of eight districts of the province Huancané in Peru.

== Ethnic groups ==
The people in the district are mainly indigenous citizens of Aymara descent. Aymara is the language which the majority of the population (92.98%) learnt to speak in childhood, 6.20% of the residents started speaking using the Spanish language (2007 Peru Census).
