= Tirapata District =

Coordinates: 14°57′22″S 70°24′15″W

Tirapata
- District
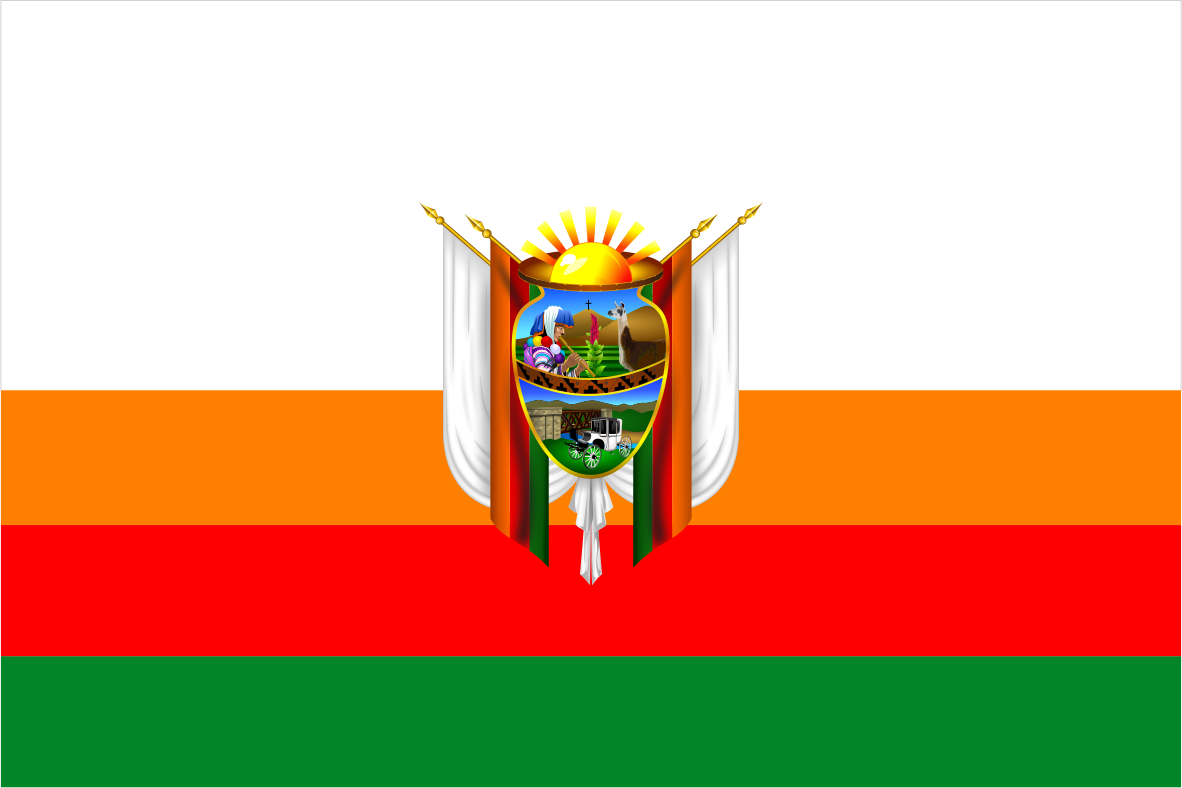
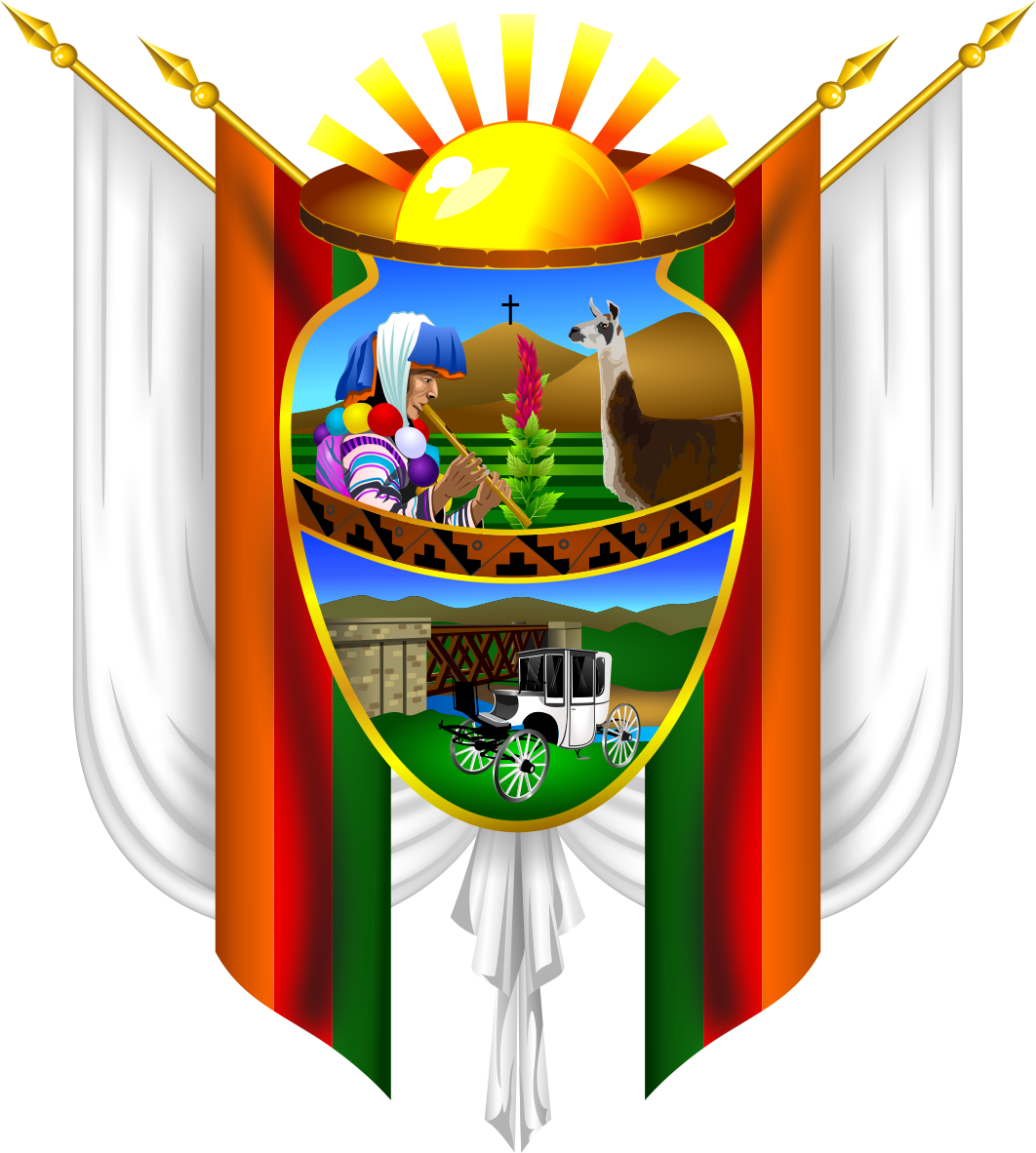
- Flag Coat of arms
- Interactive map of Tirapata
- Country: Peru
- Region: Puno
- Province: Azángaro
- Founded: November 10, 1943
- Capital: Tirapata

Government
  - Mayor: Marino Pumaleque Mango

Area
  - Total: 198.73 km^{2} (76.73 sq mi)
- Elevation: 3,880 m (12,730 ft)

Population (2005 census)
  - Total: 3,077
  - Density: 15.48/km^{2} (40.10/sq mi)
- Time zone: UTC-5 (PET)
- UBIGEO: 210215

Tirapata District is one of fifteen districts of the province Azángaro in Peru.

== Ethnic groups ==
The people in the district are mainly indigenous citizens of Quechua descent. Quechua is the language which the majority of the population (83.23%) learnt to speak in childhood, 14.13% of the residents started speaking using the Spanish language (2007 Peru Census).
