= José Domingo Choquehuanca District =

Coordinates: 14°59′47″S 70°16′22″W

José Domingo Choquehuanca Chuqiwanka
- District
- Interactive map of José Domingo Choquehuanca
- Country: Peru
- Region: Puno
- Province: Azángaro
- Founded: October 11, 1954
- Capital: Estación de Pucara

Government
  - Mayor: Ponsiano Mamani Ccala

Area
  - Total: 69.73 km^{2} (26.92 sq mi)
- Elevation: 3,870 m (12,700 ft)

Population (2005 census)
  - Total: 5,286
  - Density: 75.81/km^{2} (196.3/sq mi)
- Time zone: UTC-5 (PET)
- UBIGEO: 210207

José Domingo Choquehuanca District is one of fifteen districts of the province Azángaro in Peru.

== Ethnic groups ==
The people in the district are mainly indigenous citizens of Quechua descent. Quechua is the language which the majority of the population (68.43%) learnt to speak in childhood, 31.29% of the residents started speaking using the Spanish language (2007 Peru Census).

== Climate ==
José Domingo Choquehuanca has a Subtropical highland climate of the rare type (Cwc).

Climate data for José Domingo Choquehuanca
Month	Jan	Feb	Mar	Apr	May	Jun	Jul	Aug	Sep	Oct	Nov	Dec	Year
Mean daily maximum °C (°F)	17.0 (62.6)	16.5 (61.7)	16.4 (61.5)	16.6 (61.9)	16.3 (61.3)	15.9 (60.6)	15.7 (60.3)	17.0 (62.6)	17.5 (63.5)	18.7 (65.7)	18.8 (65.8)	17.3 (63.1)	17.0 (62.6)
Daily mean °C (°F)	9.9 (49.8)	9.8 (49.6)	9.4 (48.9)	8.4 (47.1)	6.8 (44.2)	4.7 (40.5)	4.4 (39.9)	5.8 (42.4)	8.0 (46.4)	9.3 (48.7)	9.6 (49.3)	10.0 (50.0)	8.0 (46.4)
Mean daily minimum °C (°F)	2.9 (37.2)	3.1 (37.6)	2.5 (36.5)	0.3 (32.5)	−2.6 (27.3)	−6.5 (20.3)	−6.9 (19.6)	−5.4 (22.3)	−1.5 (29.3)	0.0 (32.0)	0.4 (32.7)	2.7 (36.9)	−0.9 (30.4)
Average precipitation mm (inches)	148 (5.8)	121 (4.8)	109 (4.3)	52 (2.0)	10 (0.4)	5 (0.2)	3 (0.1)	9 (0.4)	29 (1.1)	50 (2.0)	70 (2.8)	114 (4.5)	720 (28.4)
Source: Climate-Data.org

== Tourist attractions ==
=== Breeding and preservation of vicuñas ===
At a distance of 7 km from the town of José Domingo Choquehuanca the community of San Pedro Buenavista relies its main economic activity in preservation of vicuñas, its taxonomic name is: Auchenia Vicuna. This precious animal lives mainly on the Titicaca highlands. This animal is not domesticated. The color and fineness of its wool is highly appreciated worldwide, the herd is always headed by a male that in some cases reaches 50 members in the herd. At present it is under the administration of a special committee of said community, with approximately more than 100 vicuñas, thus avoiding the extermination of these animals by poachers.

The vicuñas are distributed in five series: Male Parents, Females, Young, Tropillas and Solitaires. For their grazing they are outdoors surrounded by a mesh on a land of approximately 400 ha approx.

Also at some distance from the town is the imposing "Qiqirana" lagoon, which is named after the animal species called "Qiqi". Currently it maintains its biodiversity (flora and fauna). It has a residual tectonic origin.

In the middle of the path towards the top of the lagoon, there are archaeological remains of Qulla origin, dating from the late intermediate period (1100 - 1450). Archaeological complex that has walls of defense and defense against invaders. . The houses are made of stone with a diameter of 1.2 m and a height of 1.5 m. Called urban area. In the back towards the west there are necropolis tombs (300 units approx). It has a purely lithic construction called by some as “Rumi marka” or (Stone fort).

=== Quqra Chullpas ===
5 km from the town of J.D.CH. There are remains of chullpas or funerary monuments, located under the hill of the community of Quqra, which probably inhabited and / or emerged independent lordships around the 12th century, which were later organized by the confederations, having an architecture of artificial terraces and settlements in the summits as can be seen today.
