= Taruja Pincha =

Mountain in Peru

- Location within Peru

Highest point
- Elevation: 4,800 m (15,700 ft)
- Coordinates: 14°31′41″S 70°04′04″W

Geography
- Location: Peru, Puno Region, Azángaro Province
- Parent range: Andes

Taruja Pincha (Aymara taruja deer, pincha irrigation channel or ditch, "deer ditch", Hispanicized spelling Tarucapincha) or Taruka Pincha (Quechua taruka deer, pincha aqueduct; sewer) is a mountain in the Peruvian Andes, about 4,800 metres (15,748 ft) high. It is located in the Puno Region, Azángaro Province, on the border of the districts Muñani and Potoni.
