= San José District, Azángaro =

Coordinates: 14°41′14″S 70°10′28″W

San José District
- District
- Interactive map of San José District
- Country: Peru
- Region: Puno
- Province: Azángaro
- Founded: May 2, 1854
- Capital: San José

Government
  - Mayor: Enrique Eron Alarcon Huahuacondori

Area
  - Total: 372.73 km^{2} (143.91 sq mi)
- Elevation: 4,082 m (13,392 ft)

Population (2005 census)
  - Total: 7,183
  - Density: 19.27/km^{2} (49.91/sq mi)
- Time zone: UTC-5 (PET)
- UBIGEO: 210212

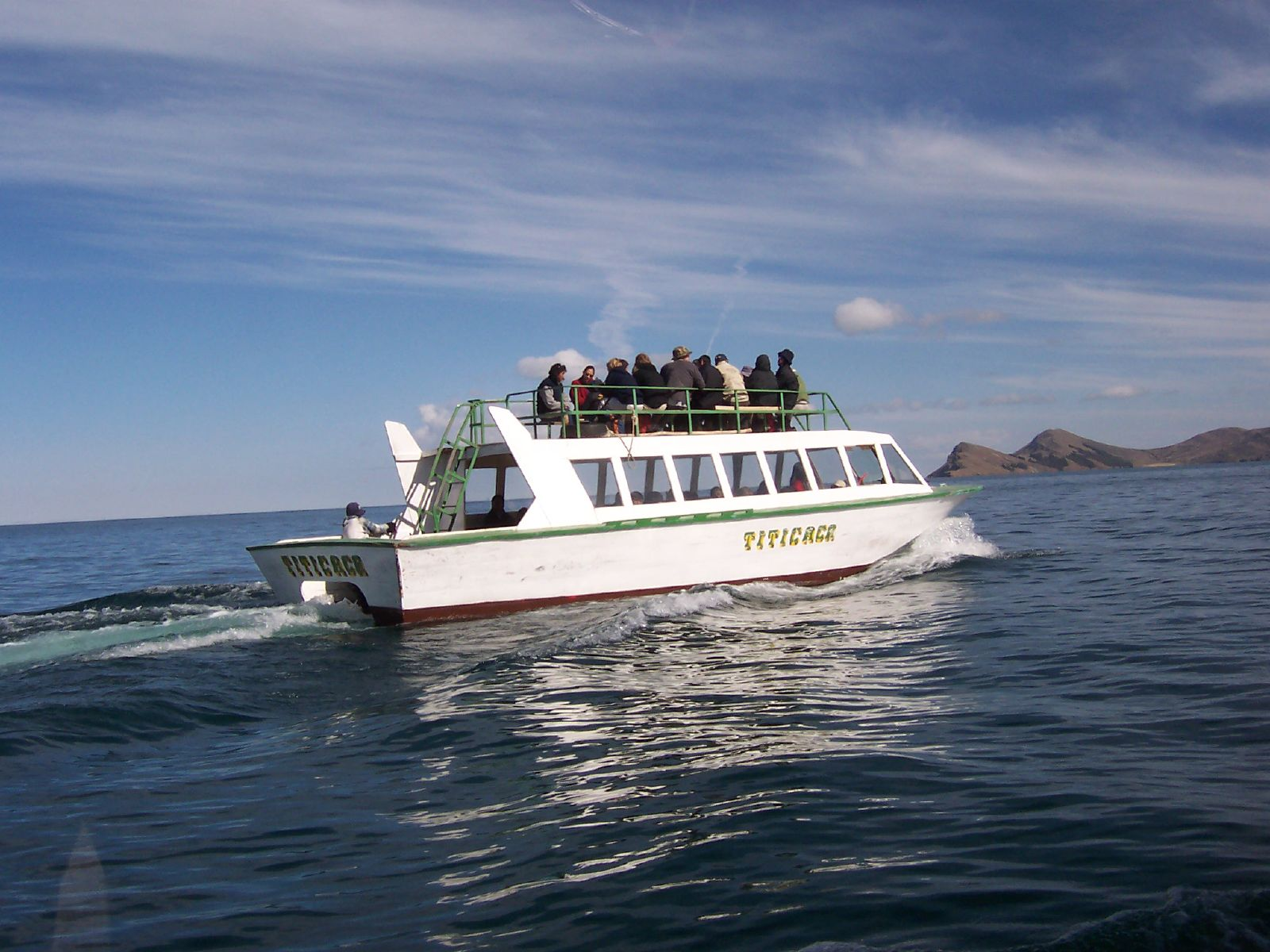
A tourist boat on Late Titicaca

San José District is one of fifteen districts of the Azángaro Province in Peru.

== Geography ==
One of the highest elevations of the district is Surupana at approximately 5,162 m (16,936 ft). Other mountains are listed below:

- Allqamarini
- Anta Qalla
- Anta Mit'ani
- Ch'amakani
- Hatun Qurini
- Llallawa
- Mansanani
- Pukara
- Uqi Kunka
- T'utura Pata
- Warachani

== Ethnic groups ==
The people in the district are mainly indigenous citizens of Quechua descent. Quechua is the language which the majority of the population (80.67%) learnt to speak in childhood, 18.85% of the residents started speaking using the Spanish language (2007 Peru Census).
