= Q'atawi Qullu =

Mountain in Peru

- Location within Peru

Highest point
- Elevation: 4,600 m (15,100 ft)
- Coordinates: 14°24′51″S 70°11′52″W

Geography
- Location: Peru, Puno Region, Azángaro Province
- Parent range: Andes

Q'atawi Qullu (Aymara q'atawi lime, qullu mountain, "lime mountain", Hispanicized spelling Catahuicollo) is a mountain in the Peruvian Andes, about 4,600 metres (15,092 ft) high. It is located in the Puno Region, Azángaro Province, at the border of the districts Potoni and San Antón.
