= Huancané District =

Coordinates: 15°11′59″S 69°45′47″W

Huancané Wankani
- District
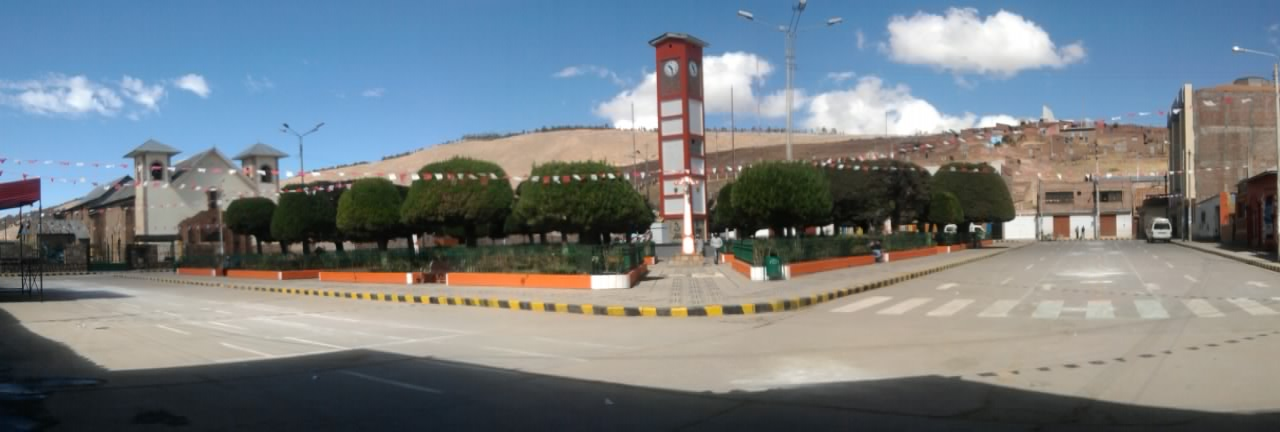
- Huancané
- Interactive map of Huancané
- Country: Peru
- Region: Puno
- Province: Huancané
- Capital: Huancané

Government
  - Mayor: Alex Gomez Pacoricona

Area
  - Total: 381.62 km^{2} (147.34 sq mi)
- Elevation: 3,841 m (12,602 ft)

Population (2005 census)
  - Total: 23,474
  - Density: 61.511/km^{2} (159.31/sq mi)
- Time zone: UTC-5 (PET)
- UBIGEO: 210601

Huancané District (Aymara Wankani) is one of eight districts of the province Huancané in Peru.

== Ethnic groups ==
The people in the district are mainly indigenous citizens of Aymara descent. Aymara is the language which the majority of the population (68.45%) learnt to speak in childhood, 29.65% of the residents started speaking using the Spanish language (2007 Peru Census).

== Climate ==
Climate data for Huancané, elevation 3,842 m (12,605 ft), (1991–2020)
Month	Jan	Feb	Mar	Apr	May	Jun	Jul	Aug	Sep	Oct	Nov	Dec	Year
Mean daily maximum °C (°F)	15.0 (59.0)	15.0 (59.0)	15.0 (59.0)	15.4 (59.7)	15.3 (59.5)	14.7 (58.5)	14.6 (58.3)	15.2 (59.4)	16.2 (61.2)	16.5 (61.7)	17.0 (62.6)	16.1 (61.0)	15.5 (59.9)
Mean daily minimum °C (°F)	4.3 (39.7)	4.2 (39.6)	3.4 (38.1)	1.4 (34.5)	−2.5 (27.5)	−4.9 (23.2)	−5.3 (22.5)	−3.8 (25.2)	−0.6 (30.9)	1.6 (34.9)	2.6 (36.7)	3.8 (38.8)	0.4 (32.6)
Average precipitation mm (inches)	126.4 (4.98)	117.3 (4.62)	92.8 (3.65)	35.1 (1.38)	10.2 (0.40)	4.8 (0.19)	4.4 (0.17)	8.0 (0.31)	23.5 (0.93)	52.8 (2.08)	51.3 (2.02)	105.4 (4.15)	632 (24.88)
Source: National Meteorology and Hydrology Service of Peru
