= San Antón District =

Coordinates: 14°35′17″S 70°18′39″W

San Anton
- District
- Interactive map of San Anton
- Country: Peru
- Region: Puno
- Province: Azángaro
- Capital: San Anton

Government
  - Mayor: Adrian Joel Quispe Alata

Area
  - Total: 514.84 km^{2} (198.78 sq mi)
- Elevation: 3,960 m (12,990 ft)

Population (2005 census)
  - Total: 7,128
  - Density: 13.85/km^{2} (35.86/sq mi)
- Time zone: UTC-5 (PET)
- UBIGEO: 210211

San Anton District is one of fifteen districts of the Azángaro Province in Peru.

== Geography ==
One of the highest peaks of the district is Allqamarini at approximately 4,800 m (15,700 ft). Other mountains are listed below:

- Aqu Muruq'u
- Ch'iyar Jaqhi
- Ch'uwaña
- Hatun Anta
- Ichhu Muruq'u
- Paqu K'ark'a
- Puma Pirwa
- Quri Kunka
- Q'atawi Qullu
- Tawqani
- Tika Pallana
- Uqi Apachita
- Warachani
- Wisk'achani
- Yuraq Apachita

== Ethnic groups ==
The people in the district are mainly indigenous citizens of Quechua descent. Quechua is the language which the majority of the population (70.87%) learnt to speak in childhood, 28.80% of the residents started speaking using the Spanish language (2007 Peru Census).
