= Ichhu Muruq'u =

Mountain in Peru

- Location within Peru

Highest point
- Elevation: 4,600 m (15,100 ft)
- Coordinates: 14°28′10″S 70°09′44″W

Geography
- Location: Peru, Puno Region
- Parent range: Andes

Ichhu Muruq'u (Quechua ichhu Peruvian feather grass (stipa ichu), muruq'u ball (of yarn, wool), "ichhu ball", Hispanicized spelling Ichumoroco) is a mountain in the Peruvian Andes, about 4,600 metres (15,092 ft) high. It is located in the Puno Region, Azángaro Province, on the border of the districts Potoni and San Antón. Ichhu Muruq'u lies west of the mountain Ch'iyar Jaqhi and northeast of Yuraq Apachita and Quri Kunka.
