= Chupa District =

Coordinates: 15°06′17″S 69°59′44″W

Chupa
- District
- Interactive map of Chupa
- Country: Peru
- Region: Puno
- Province: Azángaro
- Founded: May 2, 1854
- Capital: Chupa, Chupa District

Government
  - Mayor: Clemente Idelionso Lopez Chipana

Area
  - Total: 143.21 km^{2} (55.29 sq mi)
- Elevation: 3,840 m (12,600 ft)

Population (2005 census)
  - Total: 10,428
  - Density: 72.816/km^{2} (188.59/sq mi)
- Time zone: UTC-5 (PET)
- UBIGEO: 210206

Chupa District is one of fifteen districts of the province Azángaro in Peru.

== Ethnic groups ==
The people in the district are mainly indigenous citizens of Quechua descent. Quechua is the language which the majority of the population (94.41%) learnt to speak in childhood, 5.15% of the residents started speaking using the Spanish language (2007 Peru Census).
