= Regional Government of Puno =

Regional government in Peru

- Gobierno Regional de Puno

Regional Government overview
- Formed: January 1, 2003; 22 years ago
- Jurisdiction: Department of Puno
- Website: Government site

The Regional Government of Puno (Spanish: Gobierno Regional de Puno; GORE Puno) is the regional government that represents the Department of Puno. It is the body with legal identity in public law and its own assets, which is in charge of the administration of provinces of the department in Peru. Its purpose is the social, cultural and economic development of its constituency. It is based in the city of Puno.

== List of representatives ==
Governor	Political party	Period
David Jiménez Sardón	Movimiento por la Autonomía Regional Quechua y Aimara	January 1, 2003–December 31, 2006
Hernán Fuentes Guzmán	Avanza País	January 1, 2007–December 31, 2010
Mauricio Rodríguez Rodríguez	Proyecto Político Aquí	January 1, 2011–December 31, 2014
Juan Luque Mamani	Proyecto de la Integración para la Cooperación	January 1, 2015–December 31, 2018
Walter Aduviri Calisaya	Movimiento de Integración por el Desarrollo Regional	January 1, 2019–March 10, 2020
Agustín Luque Chayña	Movimiento de Integración por el Desarrollo Regional	March 10, 2020–November 3, 2021
Germán Alejo Apaza	Movimiento de Integración por el Desarrollo Regional	November 3, 2021–December 31, 2022
Richard Hancco Soncco	Reforma y Honradez por Más Obras	January 1, 2023–Incumbent

== See also ==
- Regional Governments of Peru
- Department of Puno
