= Achaya District =

Coordinates: 15°16′10″S 70°08′35″W

Achaya
- District
- Interactive map of Achaya
- Country: Peru
- Region: Puno
- Province: Azángaro
- Founded: May 2, 1854
- Capital: Achaya

Government
  - Mayor: Pepe Romulo Condori Carlosviza

Area
  - Total: 132.23 km^{2} (51.05 sq mi)
- Elevation: 3,846 m (12,618 ft)

Population (2005 census)
  - Total: 3,770
  - Density: 28.5/km^{2} (73.8/sq mi)
- Time zone: UTC-5 (PET)
- UBIGEO: 210202

Achaya District is one of fifteen districts of the province Azángaro in Peru.

== Ethnic groups ==
The people in the district are mainly indigenous citizens of Quechua descent. Quechua is the language which the majority of the population (96.78%) learnt to speak in childhood, 2.74% of the residents started speaking using the Spanish language (2007 Peru Census).
