= Muñani District =

Coordinates: 14°45′49″S 69°57′09″W

Muñani
- District
- Interactive map of Muñani
- Country: Peru
- Region: Puno
- Province: Azángaro
- Founded: May 2, 1854
- Capital: Muñani

Government
  - Mayor: Leonidas Endara Mamani

Area
  - Total: 764.49 km^{2} (295.17 sq mi)
- Elevation: 3,919 m (12,858 ft)

Population (2005 census)
  - Total: 7,665
  - Density: 10.03/km^{2} (25.97/sq mi)
- Time zone: UTC-5 (PET)
- UBIGEO: 210208

Muñani District is one of fifteen districts of the Azángaro Province in Peru.

== Geography ==
One of the highest peaks of the district is Ch'amakani at approximately 4,800 m (15,700 ft). Other mountains are listed below:

- Allqamarini
- Chiwanani
- Chuqi Muruq'u
- Ch'iyara Apachita
- Hatun Jayuni
- Muru Sinqa
- Pacha Punta
- Pukara
- Pukarani
- Pupusani
- P'isaqani
- P'ukru Pata
- Qiñwani
- Sullukuta
- Sura Pata
- Taruja Pincha
- Uqi Apachita
- Usqulluni
- Waylla Tira
- Wayna Putus
- Wila Kunka
- Wila Sirka
- Wila Susuya
- Wila Tuqu
- Willkanuta
- Wiluyu

== Ethnic groups ==
The people in the district are mainly indigenous citizens of Quechua descent. Quechua is the language which the majority of the population (86.21%) learnt to speak in childhood, 13.55% of the residents started speaking using the Spanish language (2007 Peru Census).

== Climate ==
Climate data for Muñani, elevation 3,932 m (12,900 ft), (1991–2020)
Month	Jan	Feb	Mar	Apr	May	Jun	Jul	Aug	Sep	Oct	Nov	Dec	Year
Mean daily maximum °C (°F)	15.6 (60.1)	15.6 (60.1)	16.1 (61.0)	16.6 (61.9)	16.7 (62.1)	16.2 (61.2)	16.1 (61.0)	17.1 (62.8)	17.7 (63.9)	17.7 (63.9)	17.9 (64.2)	16.7 (62.1)	16.7 (62.0)
Mean daily minimum °C (°F)	4.3 (39.7)	4.5 (40.1)	3.9 (39.0)	2.5 (36.5)	0.0 (32.0)	−2.1 (28.2)	−2.4 (27.7)	−1.4 (29.5)	0.7 (33.3)	2.2 (36.0)	3.1 (37.6)	3.9 (39.0)	1.6 (34.9)
Average precipitation mm (inches)	129.1 (5.08)	101.7 (4.00)	88.8 (3.50)	40.1 (1.58)	9.0 (0.35)	3.1 (0.12)	2.7 (0.11)	7.7 (0.30)	21.5 (0.85)	49.8 (1.96)	52.4 (2.06)	97.3 (3.83)	603.2 (23.74)
Source: National Meteorology and Hydrology Service of Peru
