= San Juan de Salinas District =

Coordinates: 15°00′51″S 70°16′12″W

San Juan de Salinas
- District
- Interactive map of San Juan de Salinas
- Country: Peru
- Region: Puno
- Province: Azángaro
- Founded: November 21, 1908
- Capital: San Juan de Salinas

Government
  - Mayor: Edgar Inofuente Cari

Area
  - Total: 106 km^{2} (41 sq mi)
- Elevation: 3,840 m (12,600 ft)

Population (2005 census)
  - Total: 3,823
  - Density: 36.1/km^{2} (93.4/sq mi)
- Time zone: UTC-5 (PET)
- UBIGEO: 210213

San Juan de Salinas District is one of fifteen districts of the province Azángaro in Peru.

== Ethnic groups ==
The people in the district are mainly indigenous citizens of Quechua descent. Quechua is the language which the majority of the population (92.72%) learnt to speak in childhood, 6.99% of the residents started speaking using the Spanish language (2007 Peru Census).
