= Rosaspata District =

Coordinates: 15.2397°S 69.8078°W

Rosaspata
- District
- Interactive map of Rosaspata
- Country: Peru
- Region: Puno
- Province: Huancané
- Founded: October 24, 1876
- Capital: Rosaspata

Government
  - Mayor: Clodoaldo Poma Castro

Area
  - Total: 301.47 km^{2} (116.40 sq mi)
- Elevation: 3,872 m (12,703 ft)

Population (2005 census)
  - Total: 6,145
  - Density: 20.38/km^{2} (52.79/sq mi)
- Time zone: UTC-5 (PET)
- UBIGEO: 210606

Rosaspata District is one of eight districts of the province Huancané in Peru.

== Ethnic groups ==
The people in the district are mainly indigenous citizens of Aymara descent. Aymara is the language which the majority of the population (93.34%) learnt to speak in childhood; 5.81% of the residents started speaking using the Spanish language (2007 Peru Census).
