= Caminaca District =

Coordinates: 15°18′52″S 70°12′09″W

Caminaca
- District
- Interactive map of Caminaca
- Country: Peru
- Region: Puno
- Province: Azángaro
- Capital: Caminaca

Government
  - Mayor: Cesar Augusto Huaman Suero

Area
  - Total: 146.88 km^{2} (56.71 sq mi)
- Elevation: 3,804 m (12,480 ft)

Population (2005 census)
  - Total: 3,791
  - Density: 25.81/km^{2} (66.85/sq mi)
- Time zone: UTC-5 (PET)
- UBIGEO: 210205

Caminaca District is one of fifteen districts of the province Azángaro in Peru.

== Ethnic groups ==
The people in the district are mainly indigenous citizens of Quechua descent. Quechua is the language which the majority of the population (94.01%) learnt to speak in childhood, 5.29% of the residents started speaking using the Spanish language (2007 Peru Census).
