= Surupana =

Mountain in Peru

- Location within Peru

Highest point
- Elevation: 5,162 m (16,936 ft)
- Coordinates: 14°37′42″S 70°06′36″W

Geography
- Location: Peru, Puno Region
- Parent range: Andes

Surupana (Aymara suru beak, pana a waterbird which lives at Lake Titicaca) is a 5,162-metre-high (16,936 ft) mountain in the Peruvian Andes. It is situated in the Puno Region, Azángaro Province, San José District. Surupana lies southeast of the mountain Hatun Qurini. By the local people the mountain is venerated as an apu.
