= Yuraq Apachita (Azángaro) =

Mountain in Peru

- Location within Peru

Highest point
- Elevation: 4,800 m (15,700 ft)
- Coordinates: 14°30′42″S 70°11′04″W

Geography
- Location: Peru, Puno Region, Azángaro Province
- Parent range: Andes

Yuraq Apachita (Quechua yuraq white, Aymara apachita the place of transit of an important pass in the principal routes of the Andes; name for a stone cairn in the Andes, a little pile of rocks built along the trail in the high mountains, Hispanicized spelling Yurac Apacheta) is a mountain in the Peruvian Andes, about 4,800 metres (15,748 ft) high. It is located in the Puno Region, Azángaro Province, San Antón District. Yuraq Apachita lies southwest of the mountain Ichhu Muruq'u and northeast of Hatun Anta. It is situated at the river Tawqani (Taucane).
