= Huancané province =

Coordinates: 15°12′08″S 69°45′41″W

Huancané Wanqani
- Province
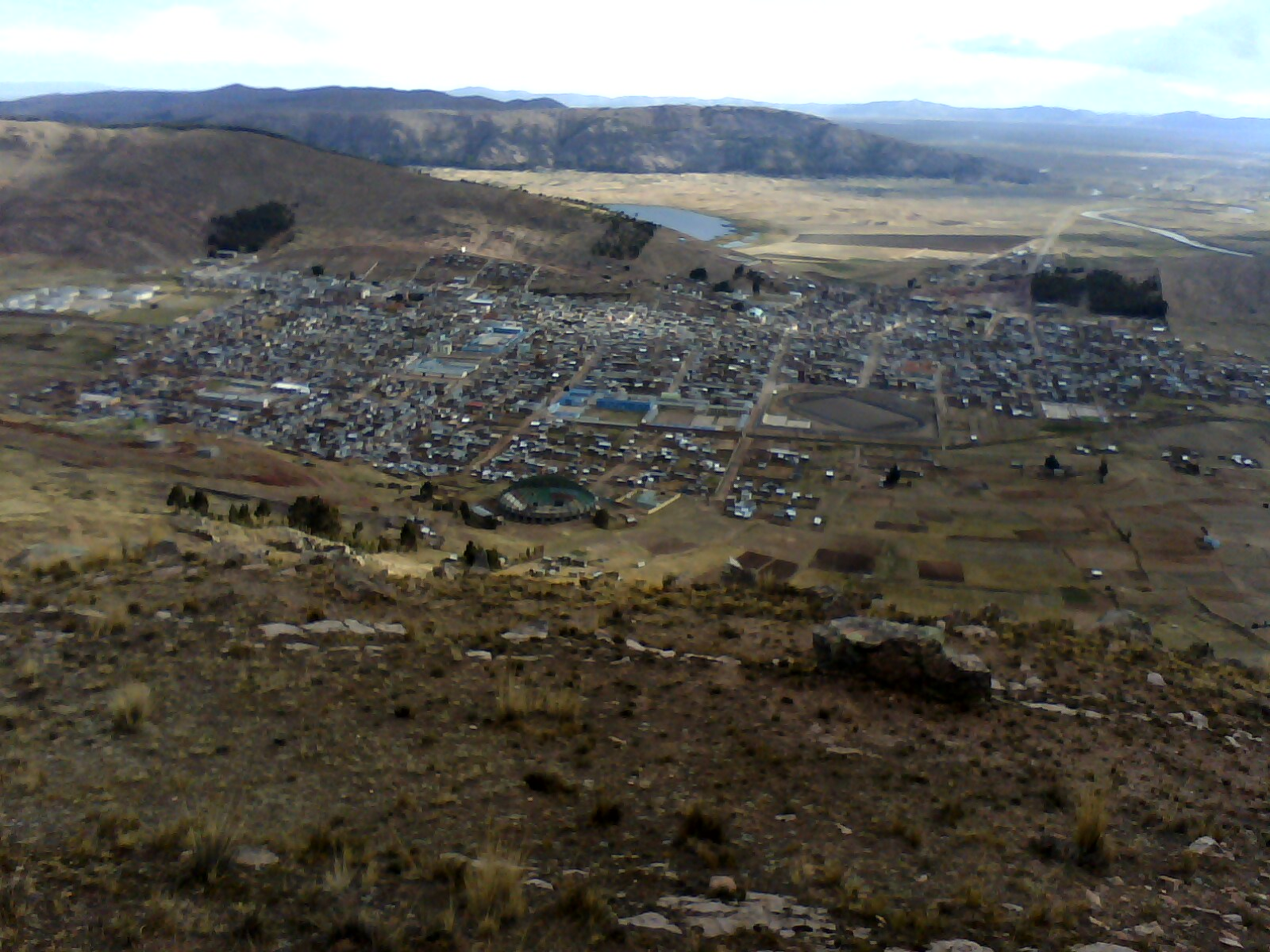
- Huancané

- Location of Huancané; Wanqani in the Puno Region
- Country: Peru
- Region: Puno
- Founded: September 19, 1827
- Capital: Huancané

Government
  - Mayor: Alex Gómez Pacoricona

Area
  - Total: 2,805.85 km^{2} (1,083.34 sq mi)
- Elevation: 3,809 m (12,497 ft)

Population
  - Total: 74,542
  - Density: 26.567/km^{2} (68.807/sq mi)
- UBIGEO: 2106
- Website: www.mphuancane.pe.nu

Huancané (from Aymara Wanqani, meaning "the one with big stones") is a province of the Puno Region in Peru. The capital of the province is the city of Huancané.

== Geography ==
One of the highest peaks of the district is Khawayuni at approximately 5,000 m (16,000 ft). Other mountains are listed below:

- Anta Waralla
- Apachita
- Aqu Aqu
- Awqani
- Chunta Salla
- Chuwallani
- Chhuqa Llusk'a
- Ch'illiw Tira
- Ch'iyar K'uchu
- Ch'iyar Salla
- Jach'a Waylla
- Janq'u Qala
- Janq'u Qullu
- Jaqhi Jaqhini
- Jichu Qullu
- Juri Quta
- Kiswar Qullu
- K'ank'a Qullu
- Laram Sillani
- Lawa Lawani
- Maych'ani
- Limani
- Llallawi
- Mullu Marka
- Muru Qullu
- Pichaqani
- Pirwa Pirwani
- Pukara
- Pura Purani
- P'unqu Pata
- Qillwani
- Qhilla Qhillani
- Salla Kunka
- Sillani
- Turini
- T'urpu Kunka
- Upa Uqhu
- Wallatiri
- Wara Qullu
- Waraq Tira
- Wari Muña
- Wayllani
- Wiluyu
- Wisk'achani

== Political division ==
The province measures 2,805.85 square kilometres (1,083.34 sq mi) and is divided into eight districts:

| District | Mayor | Capital | Ubigeo |
|---|---|---|---|
| Cojata | Hector Exaltacion Montesinos Aliaga | Cojata | 210602 |
| Huancané | Alex Gomez Pacoricona | Huancané | 210601 |
| Huatasani | Miguel Condori Condori | Huatasani | 210603 |
| Inchupalla | Juan Sucasaire Aquise | Inchupalla | 210604 |
| Pusi | Elias Quiroga Gutierrez | Pusi | 210605 |
| Rosaspata | Clodoaldo Poma Castro | Rosaspata | 210606 |
| Taraco | Efrain Vilca Callata | Taraco | 210607 |
| Vilque Chico | Hilario Ramos Salluca | Vilque Chico | 210608 |

== Ethnic groups ==
The people in the province are mainly indigenous citizens of Aymara and Quechua descent. Aymara is the language which the majority of the population (53.26%) learnt to speak in childhood, 30.82% of the residents started speaking using the Quechua language and 15.70% using Spanish (2007 Peru Census).

== See also ==
- Awki awki
