= P'aquchi =

Type of dance

P'aquchi (Aymara) is a Bolivian folk dance. It is a satire of the fencing of the Spaniards during the colonial period.
