= Huancané =

Huancané Wanqani
- Town
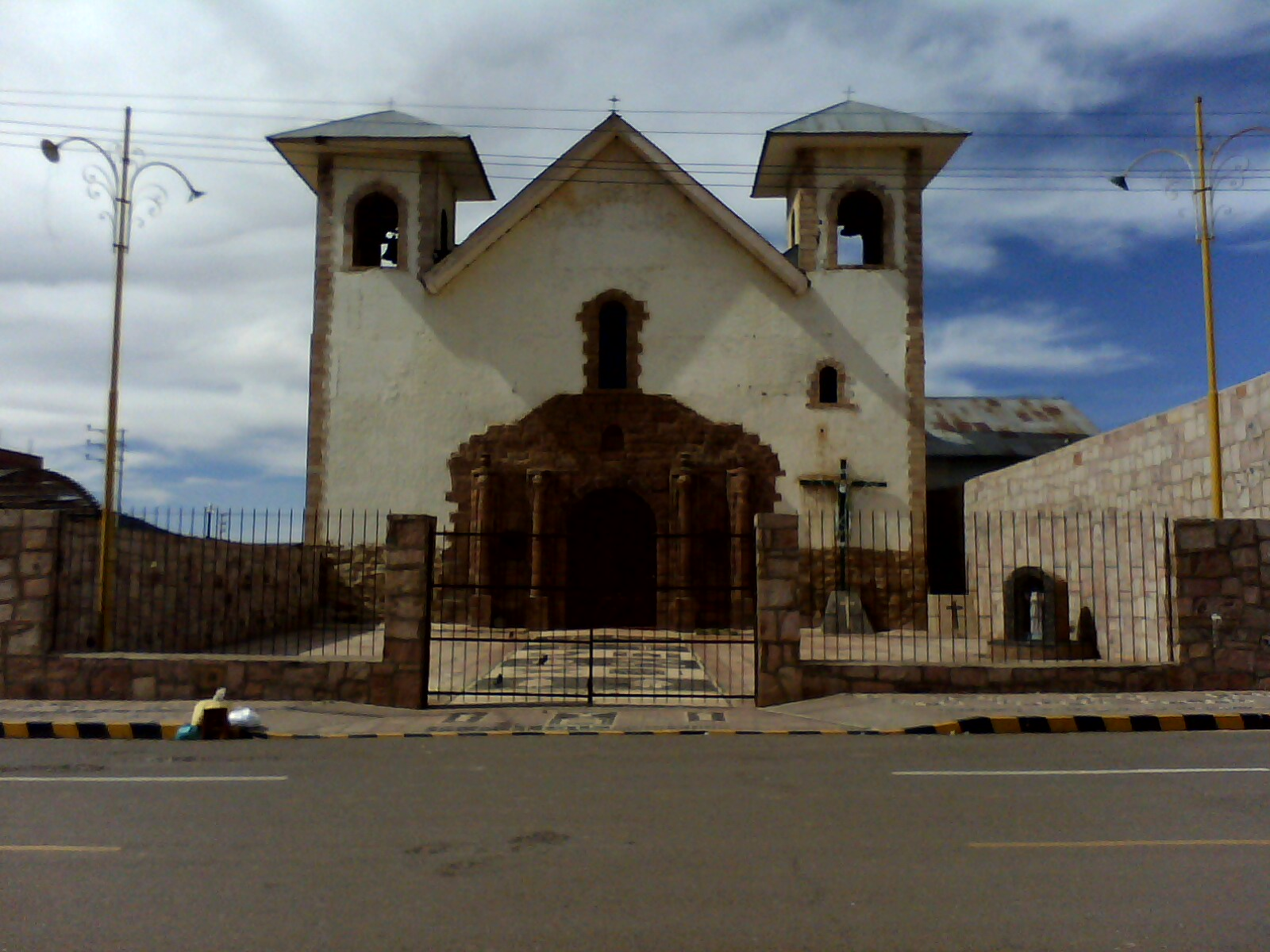
- Church of Huancané

- Location within Peru
- Coordinates: 15°12′8″S 69°45′41″W
- Country: Peru
- Region: Puno
- Province: Huancané
- District: Huancané
- Elevation: 3,841 m (12,602 ft)

Huancané (Aymara: Wanqani wanqa a big stone, -ni a suffix, "the one with a big stone (or big stones)") is the capital of the province of Huancané in Peru. The town is located about north of Lake Titicaca. The majority of the residents of Huancané's 7,000 speak Aymara.

== Climate ==
Climate data for Huancané, elevation 3,842 m (12,605 ft), (1991–2020)
Month	Jan	Feb	Mar	Apr	May	Jun	Jul	Aug	Sep	Oct	Nov	Dec	Year
Mean daily maximum °C (°F)	15.0 (59.0)	15.0 (59.0)	15.0 (59.0)	15.4 (59.7)	15.3 (59.5)	14.7 (58.5)	14.6 (58.3)	15.2 (59.4)	16.2 (61.2)	16.5 (61.7)	17.0 (62.6)	16.1 (61.0)	15.5 (59.9)
Mean daily minimum °C (°F)	4.3 (39.7)	4.2 (39.6)	3.4 (38.1)	1.4 (34.5)	−2.5 (27.5)	−4.9 (23.2)	−5.3 (22.5)	−3.8 (25.2)	−0.6 (30.9)	1.6 (34.9)	2.6 (36.7)	3.8 (38.8)	0.4 (32.6)
Average precipitation mm (inches)	126.4 (4.98)	117.3 (4.62)	92.8 (3.65)	35.1 (1.38)	10.2 (0.40)	4.8 (0.19)	4.4 (0.17)	8.0 (0.31)	23.5 (0.93)	52.8 (2.08)	51.3 (2.02)	105.4 (4.15)	632 (24.88)
Source: National Meteorology and Hydrology Service of Peru
