= Azángaro province =

Coordinates: 14°54′36″S 70°11′51″W

Azángaro
- Province
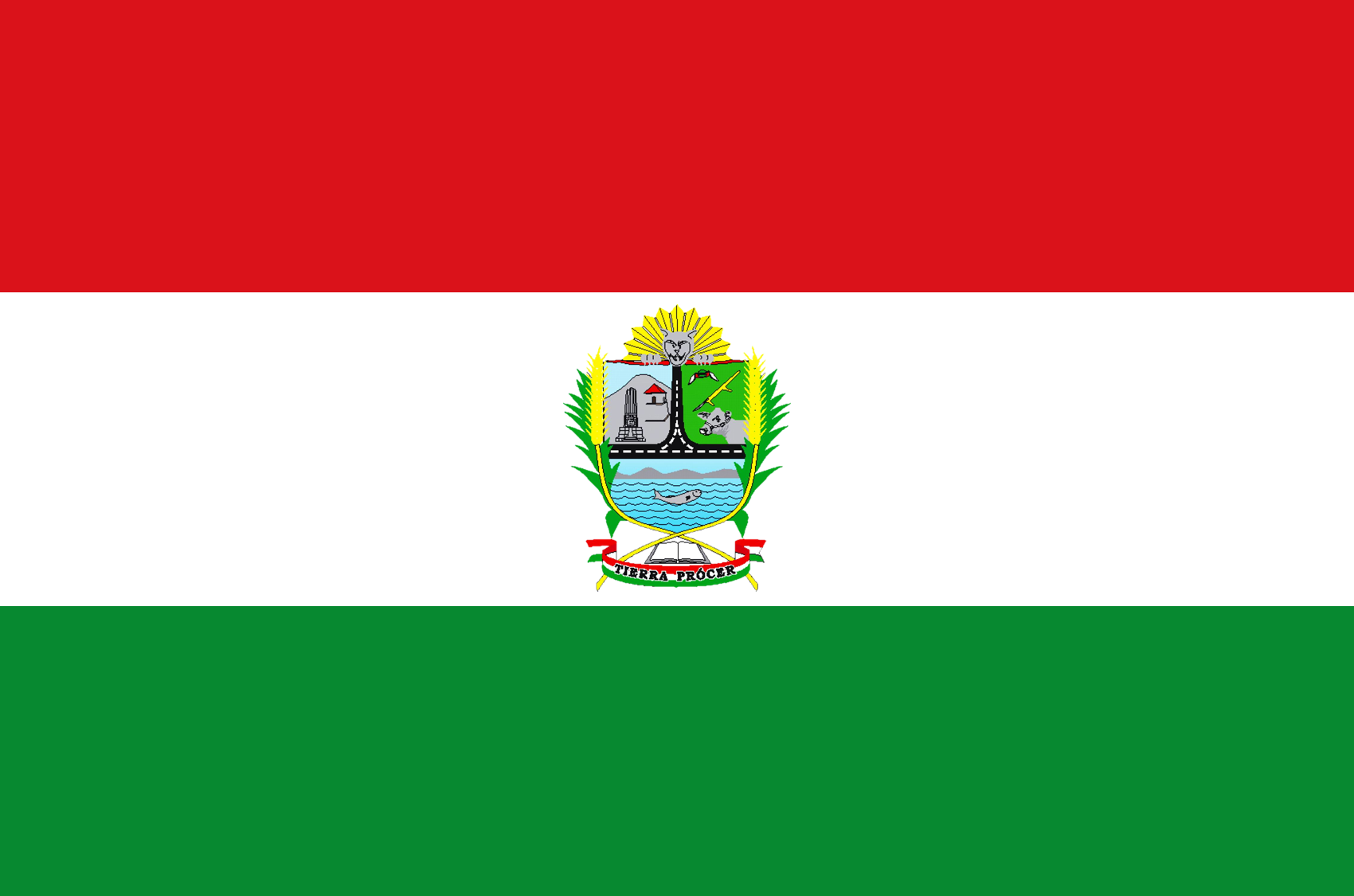
- Flag Coat of arms

- Location of Azángaro in the Puno Region
- Country: Peru
- Region: Puno
- Capital: Azángaro

Government
  - Mayor: Ruben Pachari Inofuente

Area
  - Total: 4,970.01 km^{2} (1,918.93 sq mi)
- Elevation: 3,850 m (12,630 ft)

Population
  - Total: 136.523
  - Density: 0.0274694/km^{2} (0.0711453/sq mi)
- UBIGEO: 2102
- Website: www.muniazangaro.gob.pe

Azángaro is a province of the Puno Region in Peru.

== Languages ==
According to the 2007 census, Quechua was spoken by 81.0% of the population as their first language, while 18.4% spoke Spanish, 0.3% spoke Aymara, 0.0% spoke Asháninka, 0.1% spoke other indigenous languages and 0.0% spoke foreign languages.

== Political division ==
The province measures 4,970.01 square kilometres (1,918.93 sq mi) and is divided into fifteen districts:

District	Mayor	Capital	Ubigeo
Achaya	Pepe Romulo Condori Carlosviza	Achaya	210202
Arapa	Cesar Gilberto Torres Rosello	Arapa	210203
Asillo	Jose Ludgardo Torres Sucari	Asillo	210204
Azángaro	Flavio Jesus Mamani Hancco	Azángaro	210201
Caminaca	Cesar Augusto Huaman Suero	Caminaca	210205
Chupa	Clemente Idelionso Lopez Chipana	Chupa	210206
José Domingo Choquehuanca	Ponsiano Mamani Ccala	Estación de Pucara	210207
Muñani	Leonidas Endara Mamani	Muñani	210208
Potoni	Seferino Quispe Turpo	Potoni	210209
Saman	Luis Mamani Gonzales	Saman	210210
San Antón	Adrian Joel Quispe Alata	San Antón	210211
San José	Enrique Eron Alarcon Huahuacondori	San José	210212
San Juan de Salinas	Edgar Inofuente Cari	San Juan de Salinas	210213
Santiago de Pupuja	Jaime Roger Yapo Arapa	Santiago de Pupuja	210214
Tirapata	Marino Pumaleque Mango	Tirapata	210215

== Geography ==
Some of the highest mountains of the province are listed below:

- Allqamarini
- Chiwanani
- Chuqi Muruq'u
- Ch'iyar Jaqhi
- Ch'iyara Apachita
- Hatun Jayuni
- Hatun Qurini
- Ichhu Muruq'u
- Muru Sinqa
- Pacha Punta
- Pukara
- Pukarani
- Pupusani
- P'isaqani
- P'ukru Pata
- Qiñwani
- Quri Kunka
- Q'atawi Qullu
- Sullukuta
- Sura Pata
- Surupana
- Taruja Pincha
- Uqi Apachita
- Usqulluni
- Waylla Tira
- Wayna Putus
- Wila Kunka
- Wila Sirka
- Wila Susuya
- Wila Tuqu
- Willkanuta
- Wiluyu
- Yuraq Apachita

== See also ==
- Hatun Mayu
