= Department of Puno =

Department of Peru

Puno Punu (Aymara and Quechua)
- Department
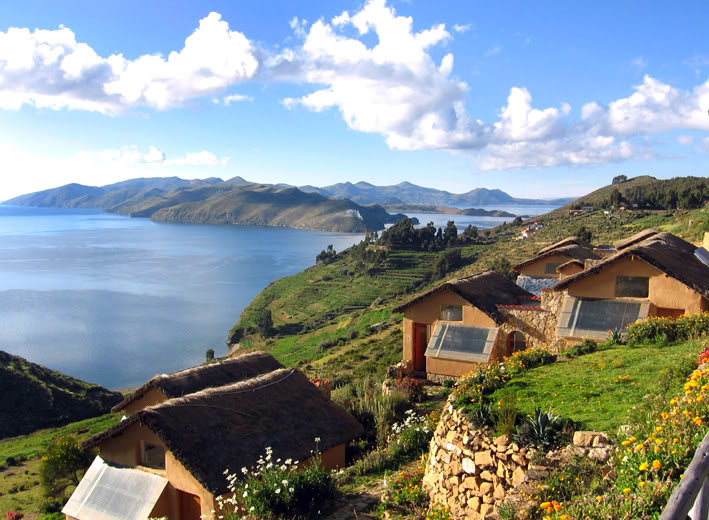
- Suasi Island and Lake Titicaca

- Flag Coat of arms

- Location of Puno within Peru
- Coordinates: 15.07°S 70.12°W
- Country: Peru
- Established: April 26, 1822
- Capital: Puno
- Provinces: List: Azángaro; Carabaya; Chucuito; El Collao; Huancané; Lampa; Melgar; Moho; Puno; San Antonio de Putina; Sandia; San Román; Yunguyo

Government
  - Type: Regional Government
  - Governor: Richard Hancco

Area
  - Total: 66,997 km^{2} (25,868 sq mi)

Population (2025)
  - Total: 1,232,995
  - Density: 18.404/km^{2} (47.665/sq mi)
- Demonym: puneño/a
- UBIGEO: 21
- Dialing code: 0+51
- ISO 3166 code: PE-PUN
- Principal resources: Quinoa; it is also the nation's largest producer of potatoes, sheep, alpacas and llamas.
- Poverty rate: 60.8% (INEI 2009)
- Percentage of Peru's GDP: 2.3%
- Website: www.regionpuno.gob.pe

Puno (Spanish pronunciation: [ˈpuno]; Aymara and Quechua: Punu) is a department of Peru. Located in the country's southeast, it is the fifth largest department in Peru, after Cuzco, Madre de Dios, Ucayali, and Loreto. It is bordered by Bolivia to the east, the departments of Madre de Dios to the north, Cusco and Arequipa to the west, Moquegua to the southwest, and Tacna to the south. It is administered by a regional government. Its capital is the city of Puno, which is located on Lake Titicaca in the geographical region known as the Altiplano or high sierra.

According to the adjusted 2025 census results, 1,233,000 people lived in Puno.

== History ==
Puno was the territory of the Tiahuanacos (800 A.D. – 1200 A.D.), who were the highest cultural expression of the Aymara people who established themselves in what is today Peru and Bolivia. The Incas took over these lands in the fifteenth century, and the Spanish, attracted by the mining industry developed there, left an important Colonial legacy throughout the entire area.

The department was created by the Reglamento Provisional de Elecciones, published on April 26, 1822, which established the department of Puno alongside those of Arequipa, Cuzco, Huamanga, and Huancavelica.

In department was the site of the 2007 Carancas impact event.

== Geography ==
The department of Puno is located in the Collao Plateau. The western part of Lake Titicaca, which is the world's highest navigable lake, is located in the department. The Andean mountains make up 70% of the region's territory, and the rest is covered by the Amazon rainforest.

The lake contains numerous islands whose inhabitants continue to live as their ancestors have in custom and tradition. The Uros an example of this; this people group lives on "floating islands" that they have artificially made entirely of totora reeds, and they navigate in their traditional boats also made out of totora reeds. Taquile, Suasi, and Amantaní are known for their kindness of their residents, their ancestral skill in weaving, their pre-Columbian constructions, and lovely countryside. The Titicaca National Reserve (36,180 hectares) protects extensive stretches of totora reeds and various species of plants and animals.

The climate is cold and dry, with a four-month rain season. On the other hand, the climate of the rainforest is warm. The water resources are taken from the Lake Titicaca, 50 lagoons and more than 300 rivers. There is also an important potential in underground waters.

== Political division ==
Map of provinces

The region is divided into 13 provinces (provincias, singular: provincia), which are composed of 107 districts (distritos, singular: distrito). The provinces, with their capitals in parentheses, are:

- Azángaro (Azángaro)
- Carabaya (Macusani)
- Chucuito (Juli)
- El Collao (Ilave)
- Huancané (Huancané)
- Lampa (Lampa)
- Melgar (Ayaviri)
- Moho (Moho)
- Puno (Puno)
- San Antonio de Putina (Putina)
- Sandia (Sandia)
- San Román (Juliaca)
- Yunguyo (Yunguyo)

== History ==
In ancient times, the Collao plateau was inhabited by Aymara groups (Collas or Qolla, Zapanas, Kallahuayos and Lupacas). The Quechuas came later.

According to chronicler Inca Garcilaso de la Vega, these ancient times coincide with the legend of Manco Cápac and Mama Ocllo, who emerged from the waters of Lake Titicaca to found the Inca Empire.

The Aymara culture, also known as Putina, was the most important and influential pre-Hispanic culture in the region.

During the Viceroyship, Puno was the obliged route for travelers going to Potosí, Bolivia. In 1668, viceroy Conde de Lemos established San Juan Bautista de Puno as the capital of the province of Paucarcolla. Later, it was called San Carlos de Puno, in honor of the ruling king, Charles II of Spain. The town was the capital of the Intendancy of Puno.

In 1870, the railway route Arequipa-Puno was installed and navigation in Lake Titicaca started.

In 2007, a meteorite landed in the region, triggering a widespread illness amongst the locals. The exact cause of the illness is unknown, but is speculated to be a result of arsenic or other toxic chemicals that may have been released by the heat of impact.

== Language and ethnicity ==
Indigenous people are the majority in the Puno region. As of 2011, 41.4% of Puno's inhabitants speak Quechua, 30.39% speak Aymara; 0.05% speak Ashaninka; and 0.03% speak another indigenous language. Monolingual Spanish speakers make up 28.1% of the population.

According to the 2007 Peru Census, the language learnt first by most of the residents was Quechua (38.01%) followed by Spanish (34.81%) and Aymara (26.93%). The Quechua variety spoken in Puno is Cusco–Collao Quechua. The following table shows the results concerning the language learnt first in the Puno Region by province:

Province	Quechua	Aymara	Asháninka	Another native language	Spanish	Foreign language	Deaf or mute	Total
Azángaro	104,456	364	12	136	23,759	6	172	128,905
Carabaya	57,703	426	6	23	10,385	14	39	68,596
Chucuito	673	86,305	170	33	31,964	8	127	119,280
El Collao	503	59,347	116	17	17,505	1	78	77,567
Huancane	20,400	35,249	32	11	10,392	5	93	66,182
Lampa	34,085	168	7	13	11,357	16	68	45,714
Melgar	49,655	163	4	13	20,479	13	65	70,392
Moho	146	22,592	41	3	3,624	-	41	26,447
Puno	60,261	57,716	119	37	98,875	625	166	217,799
Putina	28,537	4,439	15	24	14,328	1	39	47,383
San Román	67,746	19,399	48	60	139,850	40	176	227,319
Sandia	31,399	6,117	14	4	20,702	4	57	58,297
Yunguyo	252	30,691	57	18	14,177	10	32	45,237
Total	455,816	322,976	641	392	417,397	743	1,153	1,199,118
%	38.01	26.93	0.05	0.03	34.81	0.06	0.10	100.00

== Tourism ==
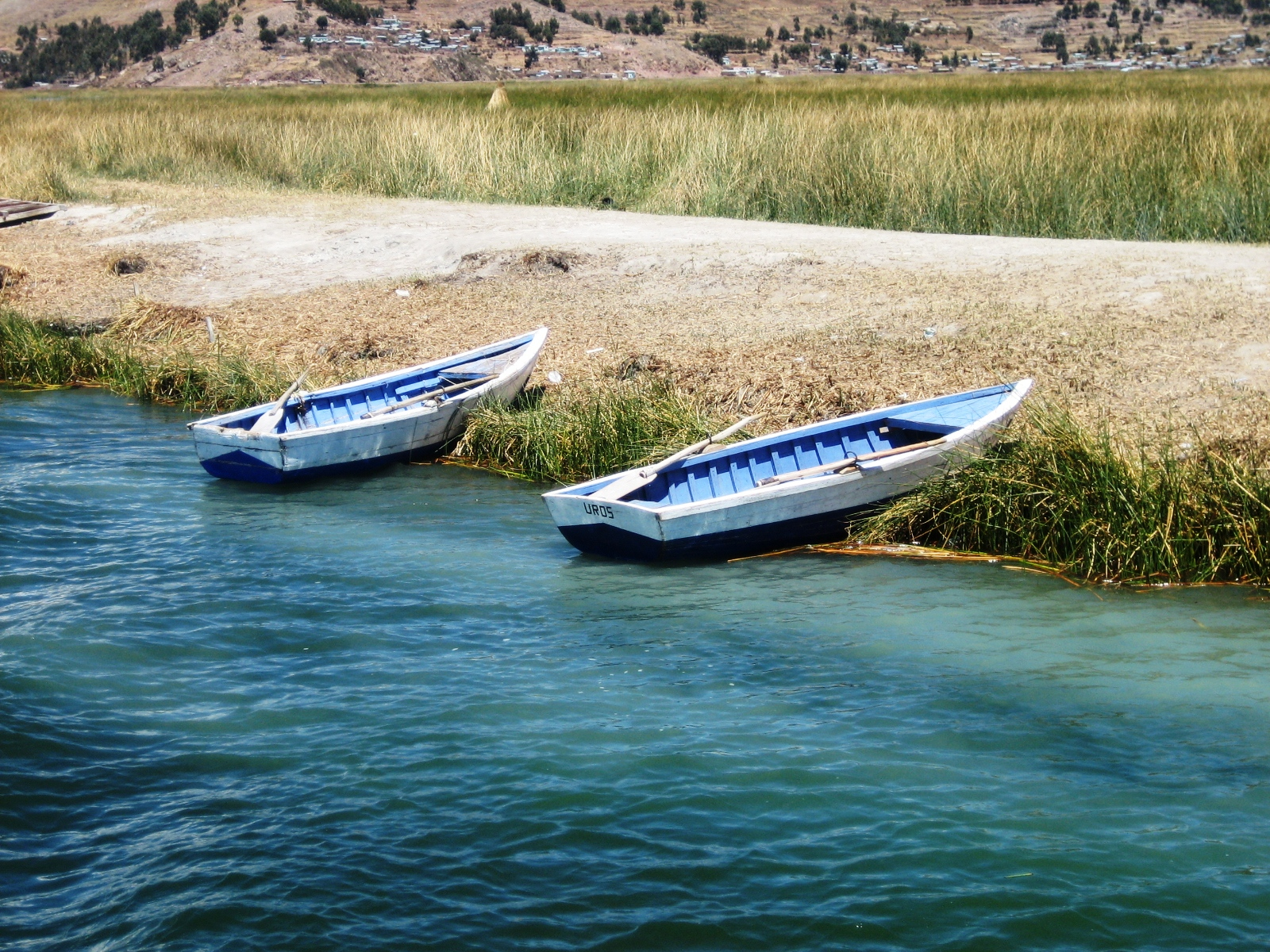
Uros Floating Islands in Puno.

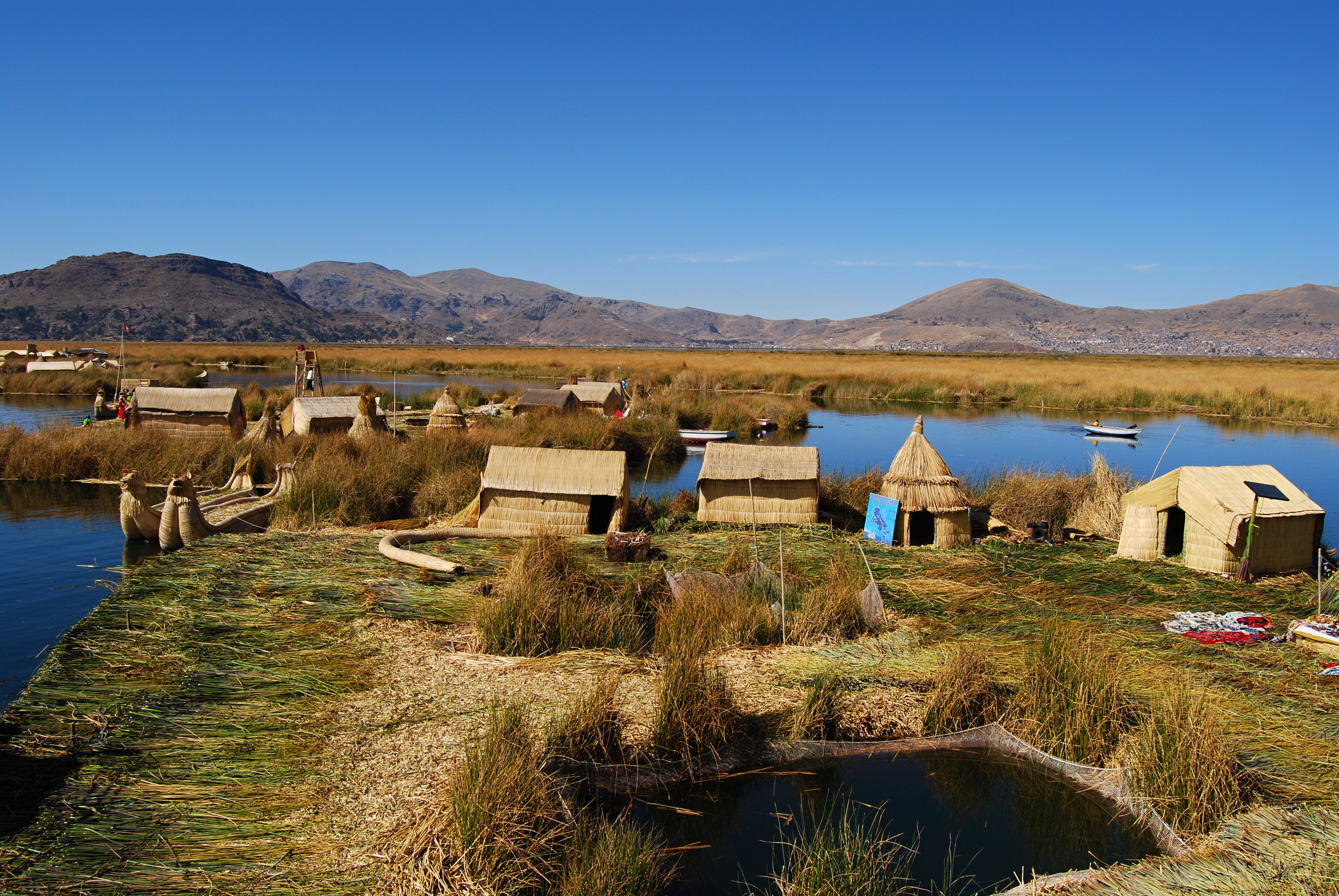
Uru people in Lake Titicaca

Tourism is currently expanding in the Puno Region, with several tour operators and hotels ranging from low budget hostels to high-end hotels.
