= Wila Qullu (Moquegua-Puno) =

Mountain in Peru

- Location within Peru

Highest point
- Elevation: 5,020 m (16,470 ft)
- Coordinates: 16°19′15″S 70°20′21″W

Geography
- Location: Peru, Moquegua Region, Puno Region
- Parent range: Andes

Wila Qullu (Aymara wila blood, blood-red, qullu mountain, "red mountain", Hispanicized spelling Vilacollo) is a 5,020-metre-high (16,470 ft) mountain in the Andes of southern Peru. It is located in the Moquegua Region, General Sánchez Cerro Province, Ichuña District, and the Puno Region, Puno Province, Pichacani District. Wila Qullu lies at the Larama Quta valley, northeast of Larama Quta and Janq'u Saxa and southeast of Wallqani. The river originates northwest of the mountain. It is a tributary of Jukumarini Lake.
