= Jat'u K'achi =

Mountain in Peru

- Location within Peru

Highest point
- Elevation: 5,200 m (17,100 ft)
- Coordinates: 16°12′11″S 70°20′50″W

Geography
- Location: Peru, Moquegua Region, Puno Region
- Parent range: Andes

Jat'u K'achi (Aymara jat'u the stripes on a blanket, k'achi incisors; chin; vertex, edge, possibly "stripe incisors", Hispanicized spelling Jatucachi) is a mountain in the Andes of southern Peru, about 5,200 metres (17,060 ft) high. It is located on the border of the Moquegua Region, General Sánchez Cerro Province, Ichuña District, and the Puno Region, Puno Province, San Antonio District. Jat'u K'achi lies west of the mountain Chuqipata, northeast of Millu and southeast of Pura Purani.
