= Ch'unch'uni =

Mountain in Peru

- Location within Peru

Highest point
- Elevation: 5,000 m (16,000 ft)
- Coordinates: 16°17′34″S 70°22′26″W

Geography
- Location: Peru, Moquegua Region
- Parent range: Andes

Ch'unch'uni (Aymara ch'unch'u head, -ni a suffix to indicate ownership, "the one with a head", ch'unch'uni murderer; full, Hispanicized spelling Chunchune) is a mountain in the Andes of southern Peru, about 5,000 metres (16,404 ft) high. It is situated in the Moquegua Region, General Sánchez Cerro Province, Ichuña District, northeast of Jukumarini Lake. Jaqhi Jaqhini lies west of the mountain Wallqani and north of Jaqhi Jaqhini.
