= Qullpani (disambiguation) =

Qullpani (Aymara qullpa saltpeter, -ni a suffix, "the one with saltpeter", also spelled Ccollpani, Ccolpani, Collpani, Colpani, Cullpane, Cullpani, Khollpani, Kollpani, Kolpani) may refer to:

- Qullpani, a mountain in the Los Andes Province, La Paz Department, Bolivia
- Qullpani (Loayza), a mountain in the Loayza Province, La Paz Department, Bolivia
- Qullpani (Peru), a mountain in Peru
- Qullpani (Potosí), a mountain in the Potosí Department, Bolivia
