= Q'isanani =

Mountain in Peru

- Location within Peru

Highest point
- Elevation: 5,000 m (16,000 ft)
- Coordinates: 16°04′55″S 70°16′13″W

Geography
- Location: Peru, Puno Region, Puno Province
- Parent range: Andes

Q'isanani (Aymara q'isana barn; totora mat, -ni a suffix to indicate ownership, "the one with a barn" or "the one with a mat", Hispanicized spelling Quesanane) is a mountain in the Andes of southern Peru, about 5,075 metres (16,650 ft) high. It is situated in the Puno Region, Puno Province, San Antonio District. Q'isanani lies northwest of the mountain Wankarani and east of Qutuni.
