= Surichata =

Mountain in Peru

- Location within Peru

Highest point
- Elevation: 4,800 m (15,700 ft)
- Coordinates: 16°02′37″S 70°14′17″W

Geography
- Location: Peru, Puno Region, Puno Province
- Parent range: Andes

Surichata (Aymara and Quechua suri rhea, Pukina chata mountain, Hispanicized spelling Zorrichata) is a mountain in the Andes of southern Peru, about 4,800 metres (15,748 ft) high. It is situated in the Puno Region, Puno Province, on the border of the districts San Antonio and Pichacani. Surichata lies north of the mountain Kunturiri and northeast of Wankarani and Ninachiri.
