= Uturunqani (disambiguation) =

Uturunqani (Aymara uturunqa, uturunqha, uturunqu, uturunqhu tiger (referring to the jaguar), -ni a suffix to indicate ownership, "the one with the jaguar", Hispanicized spellings Otoroncane, Otoronccani, Uturuncane, Uturuncani) may refer to:

- Uturunqani, a mountain in the Carabaya Province, Puno Region, Peru
- Uturunqani (Ichuña), a mountain in the Ichuña District, General Sánchez Cerro Province, Moquegua Region, Peru
- Uturunqani (Lampa), a mountain in the Lampa Province, Puno Region, Peru
- Uturunqani (Moquegua-Puno), a mountain in the districts of Ichuña and Tiquillaca on the border of the Moquegua Regiona and the Puno Region, Peru
- Otoroncane (Puno)
