= Muru Jaqhi =

Mountain in Peru

- Location within Peru

Highest point
- Elevation: 4,800 m (15,700 ft)
- Coordinates: 16°06′20″S 70°13′15″W

Geography
- Location: Peru, Puno Region, Puno Province
- Parent range: Andes

Muru Jaqhi (Aymara muru truncated, jaqhi cliff, "truncated cliff", Hispanicized spelling Morojaque) is a mountain in the Andes of southern Peru, about 4,800 metres (15,748 ft) high. It is situated in the Puno Region, Puno Province, Pichacani District. Kunturiri lies northeast of the mountain Wankarani and southeast of Ninachiri and Kunturiri.
