= Kunturini (Peru) =

Mountain in Peru

- Location within Peru

Highest point
- Elevation: 4,600 m (15,100 ft)
- Coordinates: 16°27′35″S 70°18′42″W

Geography
- Location: Peru, Moquegua Region, Puno Region
- Parent range: Andes

Kunturini (Aymara kunturi condor, -ni a suffix to indicate ownership, "the one with a condor", also spelled Condorini) is a mountain in the Peruvian Andes, about 4,600 metres (15,092 ft) high. Kunturini is located in the Moquegua Region, on the border of the General Sánchez Cerro Province, Chojata District, and the Mariscal Nieto Province, Carumas District, and in the Puno Region, Puno Province, Pichacani District. It lies southwest of the lake Pharaquta.
