= Paqu Paquni =

Mountain in Peru

- Location within Peru

Highest point
- Elevation: 5,031 m (16,506 ft)
- Coordinates: 16°22′55″S 70°31′32″W

Geography
- Location: Peru, Moquegua Region, General Sánchez Cerro Province
- Parent range: Andes

Paqu Paquni (Aymara paqu paqu sorrel colored, paqu a kind of edible herb, the reduplication indicates that there is a group or a complex of something, -ni a suffix to indicate ownership, "the sorrel colored one" or "the one with a complex of the paqu herb", Hispanicized spelling Pacopacone) is a 5,031-metre-high (16,506 ft) mountain in the Andes of Peru. It is situated in the Moquegua Region, General Sánchez Cerro Province, Chojata District, east of Jukumarini Lake.
