= Churi Wiqu (Moquegua-Puno) =

Mountain in Peru

- Location within Peru

Highest point
- Elevation: 5,000 m (16,000 ft)
- Coordinates: 16°13′12″S 70°19′27″W

Geography
- Location: Peru, Moquegua Region, Puno Region
- Parent range: Andes

Churi Wiqu (Aymara churi dull yellow, wiqu a corner in a house, a mountain cove, "dull yellow mountain cove", Hispanicized spelling Chorehueco) is a mountain in the Andes of southern Peru, about 5,000 metres (16,404 ft) high. It is situated on the border of the Moquegua Region, General Sánchez Cerro Province, Ichuña District, and the Puno Region, Puno Province, Pichacani District. It lies southeast of the mountains Tankani and Chuqipata.

Churi Wiqu is also the name of a river which originates near the mountain. It flows to the east.
