= Wila Salla =

Mountain in Peru

- Location within Peru

Highest point
- Elevation: 4,987 m (16,362 ft)
- Coordinates: 16°10′15″S 70°18′06″W

Geography
- Location: Peru, Puno Region
- Parent range: Andes

Wila Salla (Aymara wila salla rocks, cliffs, "red rocks", Hispanicized spelling Velasalla) is a 4,987-metre-high (16,362 ft) mountain in the Andes of southern Peru. It is located in the Puno Region, Puno Province, on the border of the districts Pichacani and San Antonio. Wila Salla lies northeast of the mountain Chuqipata.
