= Ch'utu Urqu =

Mountain in Bolivia

- Location within Bolivia

Highest point
- Elevation: 4,180 m (13,710 ft)
- Coordinates: 20°53′24″S 66°04′17″W

Geography
- Location: Bolivia; Potosí Department
- Parent range: Andes

Ch'utu Urqu (Quechua ch'utu cone, hill, urqu mountain, "cone mountain", also spelled Chuto Orkho) is a mountain in the Andes of Bolivia which reaches a height of approximately 4,180 m (13,710 ft). It is located in the Potosí Department, Nor Chichas Province, Cotagaita Municipality. Ch'utu Urqu lies northwest of Iskay Rumi.
