= Jatun Wasi =

Mountain in Bolivia

- Location within Bolivia

Highest point
- Elevation: 4,361 m (14,308 ft)
- Coordinates: 20°51′45″S 66°03′31″W

Geography
- Location: Bolivia; Potosí Department
- Parent range: Andes

Jatun Wasi (Quechua jatun, hatun big, wasi house, "big house", also spelled Jatun Huasi) is a 4,361-metre-high (14,308 ft) mountain in the Andes of Bolivia. It is located in the Potosí Department, Nor Chichas Province, Cotagaita Municipality. Jatun Wasi lies at the Agua Castilla River, east of Yaritayuq.
