= Jatun Qaqa (Nor Chichas) =

Mountain in Bolivia

- Location within Bolivia

Highest point
- Elevation: 3,820 m (12,530 ft)
- Coordinates: 20°53′07″S 65°55′24″W

Geography
- Location: Bolivia; Potosí Department
- Parent range: Andes

Jatun Qaqa (Quechua jatun, hatun big, qaqa rock, "big rock", also spelled Jatun Khakha) is a mountain in the Andes of Bolivia which reaches a height of approximately 3,820 m (12,530 ft). It is located in the Potosí Department, Nor Chichas Province, Cotagaita Municipality. Jatun Qaqa lies west of T'ika Wasi. The Jara Wayq'u flows along its southern slope. It is an affluent of the Caiti River.
