= Pura Purani (Peru) =

Mountain in Peru

- Location within Peru

Highest point
- Elevation: 5,000 m (16,000 ft)
- Coordinates: 16°11′59″S 70°22′10″W

Geography
- Location: Peru, Moquegua Region, Puno Region
- Parent range: Andes

Pura Purani (Aymara pura pura Xenophyllum (or a species of it), -ni a suffix to indicate ownership, "the one with the pura pura plant", also spelled Purapurani) is a mountain in the Andes of southern Peru, about 5,000 metres (16,404 ft) high. It is located on the border of the Moquegua Region, General Sánchez Cerro Province, Ichuña District, and the Puno Region, Puno Province, San Antonio District. It lies west of Chuqipata and northwest of Millu.
