= Rumi Kancha =

Mountain in Bolivia

- Location within Bolivia

Highest point
- Elevation: 3,880 m (12,730 ft)
- Coordinates: 20°42′42″S 65°47′43″W

Geography
- Location: Bolivia; Potosí Department
- Parent range: Andes

Rumi Kancha (Quechua rumi stone, kancha corral, "stone corral", also spelled Rumi Cancha) is a mountain in the Andes of Bolivia which reaches a height of approximately 3,880 m (12,730 ft). It is located in the Potosí Department, Nor Chichas Province, Cotagaita Municipality. Rumi Kancha lies south of Achakanayuq.
