= Jaqhi Jaqhini =

Mountain in Peru

- Location within Peru

Highest point
- Elevation: 5,055 m (16,585 ft)
- Coordinates: 16°18′04″S 70°22′31″W

Geography
- Location: Peru, Moquegua Region
- Parent range: Andes

Jaqhi Jaqhini (Aymara jaqhi cliff, the reduplication indicates that there is a group or a complex of something, -ni a suffix to indicate ownership, "the one with many cliffs", Hispanicized spelling Jaque Aquine) is a 5,055-metre-high (16,585 ft) mountain in the Andes of southern Peru. It is situated in the Moquegua Region, General Sánchez Cerro Province, Ichuña District, northeast of Jukumarini Lake. Jaqhi Jaqhini lies southwest of the mountain Wallqani, northwest of Larama Quta and northeast of Salla Qullu (Sallacollo).
