= Qayqu =

Qayqu (Quechua for a type of hunt, also spelled Caico, Cayco, Ccaycco, Gaico, Jaico, Jayco) may refer to:

- Qayqu (Junín), a mountain in the Junín Region, Peru
- Qayqu (Cusco), a mountain on the border of the Vilcabamba District and the Santa Teresa District, La Convención Province, Cusco Region, Peru
- Qayqu (Lima), a mountain in the Lima Region, Peru
- Qayqu (Moquegua), a mountain in the Moquegua Region, Peru
- Qayqu (Pumasillu), a mountain near Pumasillu on the border of the Vilcabamba District and the Santa Teresa District, La Convención Province, Cusco Region, Peru
