= Ch'iyar Jaqhi (Moquegua-Puno) =

Mountain in Peru

- Location within Peru

Highest point
- Elevation: 5,000 m (16,000 ft)
- Coordinates: 16°16′11″S 70°20′25″W

Geography
- Location: Peru, Moquegua Region, Puno Region
- Parent range: Andes

Ch'iyar Jaqhi (Aymara ch'iyara black, jaqhi precipice, cliff, "black cliff", hispanicized spelling Chiaraque) is a mountain in the Andes of southern Peru, about 5,000 m (16,000 ft) high. It is located on the border of the Moquegua Region, General Sánchez Cerro Province, Ichuña District, and the Puno Region, Puno Province, Pichacani District. Ch'iyar Jaqhi lies southeast of Qayqu.
