= Wanu Wanuyuq =

Mountain in Bolivia

- Location within Bolivia

Highest point
- Elevation: 4,140 m (13,580 ft)
- Coordinates: 20°42′16″S 65°45′13″W

Geography
- Location: Bolivia; Potosí Department
- Parent range: Andes

Wanu Wanuyuq (Quechua wanu dung (guano), -yuq a suffix, "the one with a lot of dung", also spelled Huano Huanoyoj) is a mountain in the Andes of Bolivia which reaches a height of approximately 4,140 m (13,580 ft). It is located in the Potosí Department, Nor Chichas Province, Cotagaita Municipality. Wanu Wanuyuq lies east of Achakanayuq.
