= Janq'u Saxa =

Mountain in Peru

- Location within Peru

Highest point
- Elevation: 4,825 m (15,830 ft)
- Coordinates: 16°19′55″S 70°20′32″W

Geography
- Location: Peru, Moquegua Region, Puno Region
- Parent range: Andes

Janq'u Saxa (Aymara janq'u white, saxa hollow, "white hollow", Hispanicized spelling Jancosaca) is a mountain in the Andes of southern Peru, about 4,825 metres (15,830 ft) high. It is located in the Moquegua Region, General Sánchez Cerro Province, Ichuña District, and the Puno Region, Puno Province, Pichacani District, northeast of Jukumarini Lake. Janq'u Saxa lies south of the mountain Wallqani, southwest of Wilaqullu and southeast of Larama Quta. It is situated at the Larama Quta River which originates northwest of the mountain. It is a tributary of Jukumarini Lake.
