= Lloque District =

Coordinates: 16.3240°S 70.7386°W

Lloque
- District
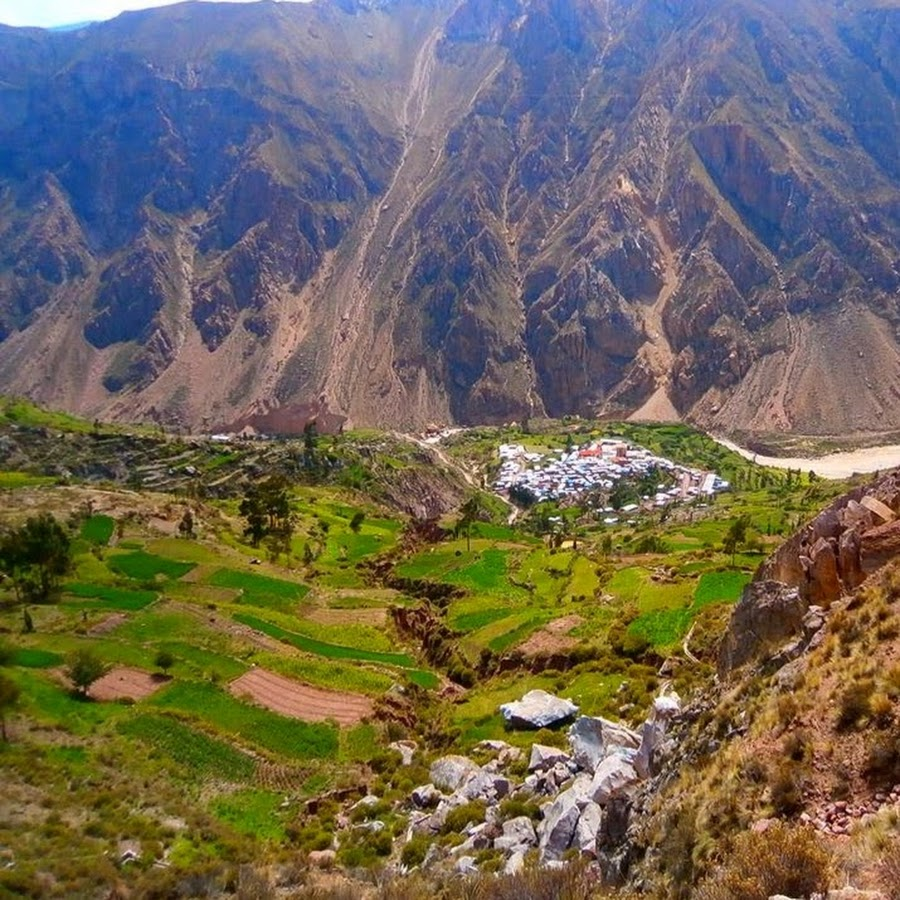
- Lloque District
- Interactive map of Lloque
- Country: Peru
- Region: Moquegua
- Province: General Sánchez Cerro
- Founded: February 2, 1956
- Capital: Lloque

Government
  - Mayor: Matias Edilberto Gutierrez Mamani

Area
  - Total: 254.45 km^{2} (98.24 sq mi)
- Elevation: 3,256 m (10,682 ft)

Population (2005 census)
  - Total: 1,206
  - Density: 4.740/km^{2} (12.28/sq mi)
- Time zone: UTC-5 (PET)
- UBIGEO: 180206

Lloque District is one of eleven districts of the province General Sánchez Cerro in Peru.

== Ethnic groups ==
The people in the district are mainly indigenous citizens of Quechua descent. Quechua is the language which the majority of the population (53.67%) learnt to speak in childhood, 45.72% of the residents started speaking using the Spanish language (2007 Peru Census).

== See also ==
- Pachakutiq
