= Puquina District =

Coordinates: 16.6255°S 71.1844°W

Puquina
- District
- Coat of arms
- Interactive map of Puquina
- Country: Peru
- Region: Moquegua
- Province: General Sánchez Cerro
- Capital: Puquina

Government
  - Mayor: Misael Guzman Ale

Area
  - Total: 550.99 km^{2} (212.74 sq mi)
- Elevation: 3,084 m (10,118 ft)

Population (2005 census)
  - Total: 3,213
  - Density: 5.831/km^{2} (15.10/sq mi)
- Time zone: UTC-5 (PET)
- UBIGEO: 180208

Puquina District is one of eleven districts of the General Sánchez Cerro Province in Peru.

== Geography ==
One of the highest peaks of the district is Takuni at approximately 5,500 m (18,000 ft). Other mountains are listed below:

- Chapiyuq
- Ch'aska Urqu
- Kimsa Puyku
- Misani
- Muntirayuq
- Paqu Q'asa
- Sasawani
- Tarujani
- Tintinniyuq
- Warani
- Wawayuq
- Wayllarani
- Wiskani
- Yana Kiska
- Yana Qaqa

== Climate ==
Climate data for Puquina, elevation 3,109 m (10,200 ft), (1991–2020)
Month	Jan	Feb	Mar	Apr	May	Jun	Jul	Aug	Sep	Oct	Nov	Dec	Year
Mean daily maximum °C (°F)	20.6 (69.1)	19.2 (66.6)	19.9 (67.8)	20.8 (69.4)	20.6 (69.1)	20.3 (68.5)	19.9 (67.8)	21.1 (70.0)	21.9 (71.4)	22.5 (72.5)	22.6 (72.7)	22.2 (72.0)	21.0 (69.7)
Mean daily minimum °C (°F)	8.3 (46.9)	8.4 (47.1)	8.4 (47.1)	8.7 (47.7)	8.4 (47.1)	8.2 (46.8)	7.8 (46.0)	8.2 (46.8)	8.1 (46.6)	8.1 (46.6)	7.8 (46.0)	8.0 (46.4)	8.2 (46.8)
Average precipitation mm (inches)	83.1 (3.27)	108.2 (4.26)	47.9 (1.89)	4.9 (0.19)	0.4 (0.02)	0.3 (0.01)	1.6 (0.06)	0.1 (0.00)	0.2 (0.01)	0.5 (0.02)	0.4 (0.02)	11.8 (0.46)	259.4 (10.21)
Source: National Meteorology and Hydrology Service of Peru
