= Yana Unu =

Mountain in Bolivia

- Location within Bolivia

Highest point
- Elevation: 4,040 m (13,250 ft)
- Coordinates: 20°50′33″S 65°54′06″W

Geography
- Location: Bolivia; Potosí Department
- Parent range: Andes

Yana Unu (Quechua yana black, unu water, "black water") is a mountain in the Andes of Bolivia which reaches a height of approximately 4,040 m (13,250 ft). It is located in the Potosí Department, Nor Chichas Province, Cotagaita Municipality. Yana Unu lies west of a valley named Jatun Q'asa ("big valley"). Its intermittent stream flows to the Caiti River.
