= Yunga District =

Coordinates: 16.1951°S 70.6780°W

Yunga Yunka
- District
- Interactive map of Yunga
- Country: Peru
- Region: Moquegua
- Province: General Sánchez Cerro
- Founded: March 19, 1965
- Capital: Yunga

Government
  - Mayor: Leonardo Chivigorri Chivigorri

Area
  - Total: 110.74 km^{2} (42.76 sq mi)
- Elevation: 3,571 m (11,716 ft)

Population (2005 census)
  - Total: 1,352
  - Density: 12.21/km^{2} (31.62/sq mi)
- Time zone: UTC-5 (PET)
- UBIGEO: 180211

Yunga District is one of eleven districts of the province General Sánchez Cerro in Peru.

== Ethnic groups ==
The people in the district are mainly indigenous citizens of Quechua descent. Quechua is the language which the majority of the population (73.38%) learnt to speak in childhood, 24.98% of the residents started speaking using the Spanish language (2007 Peru Census).

== See also ==
- Jichu Qullu
- Pachakutiq
