= Hatun P'ukru =

Mountain in Peru

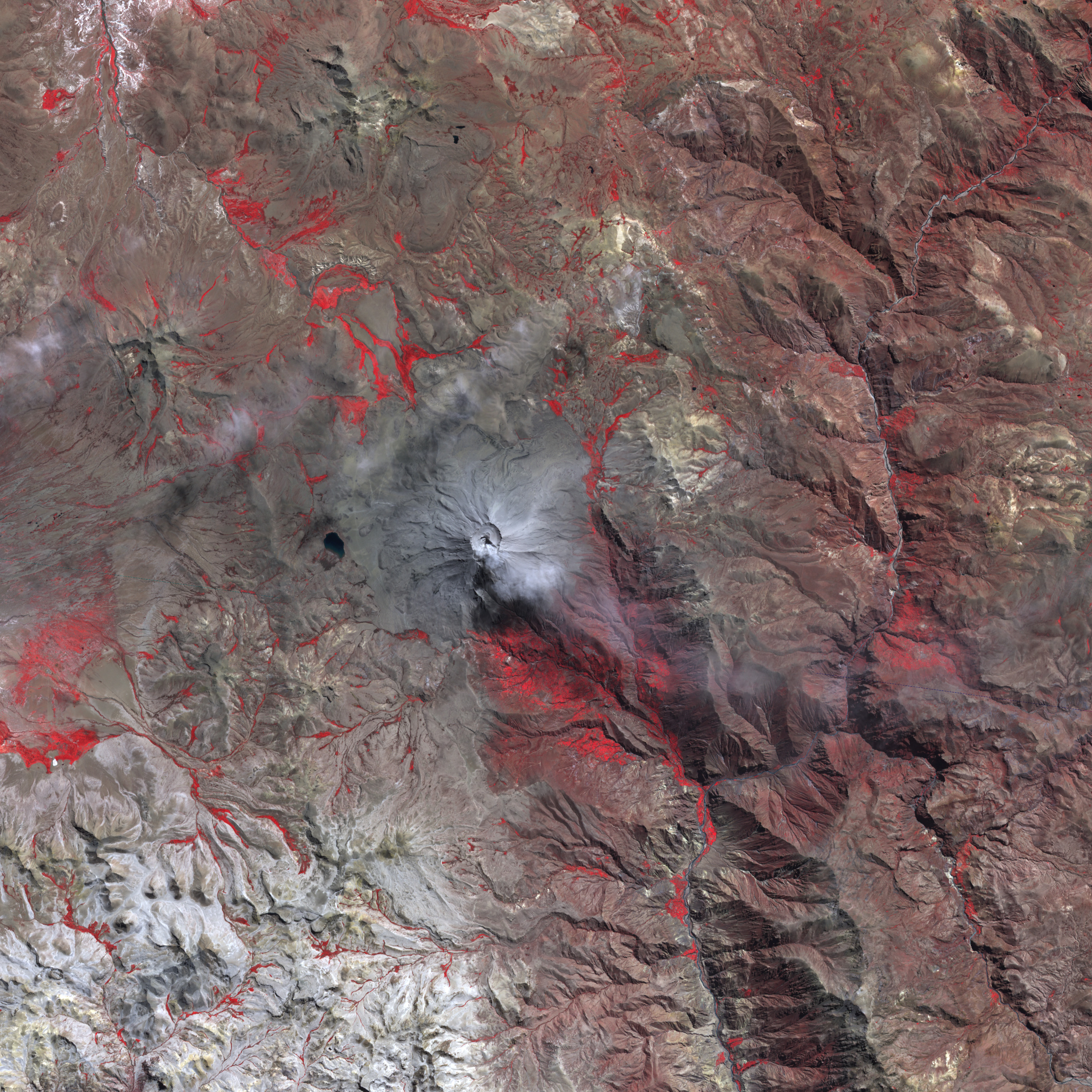
- The Ubinas volcano and Hatun P'ukru southeast of it (lower right) as seen from above (NASA, 2006)

Highest point
- Elevation: 5,153 m (16,906 ft)
- Coordinates: 16°31′04″S 70°45′29″W

Geography
- Location within Peru
- Location: Peru, Moquegua Region
- Parent range: Andes

Hatun P'ukru (Quechua hatun big, p'ukru hole, pit, gap in a surface, "big hole", Hispanicized spelling Jatun Pucro) is a mountain in the Andes of southern Peru, about 5,153-metre (16,906 ft) high. It is situated in the Moquegua Region, General Sánchez Cerro Province, on the border of the districts of Chojata and Matalaque.
