= Q'axilu =

Music genre and type of dance

Q'axilu (Aymara, Hispanicized spelling Cajelo, also Kajelo, K'ajelo, Q'ajelo) is a folk dance of the Aymara people in the Puno Region of Peru. It is a typical dance of the Puno, Chucuito and El Collao provinces. Q'axilu is also the name of a genre of love song of the Puno Region.

== Gallery ==
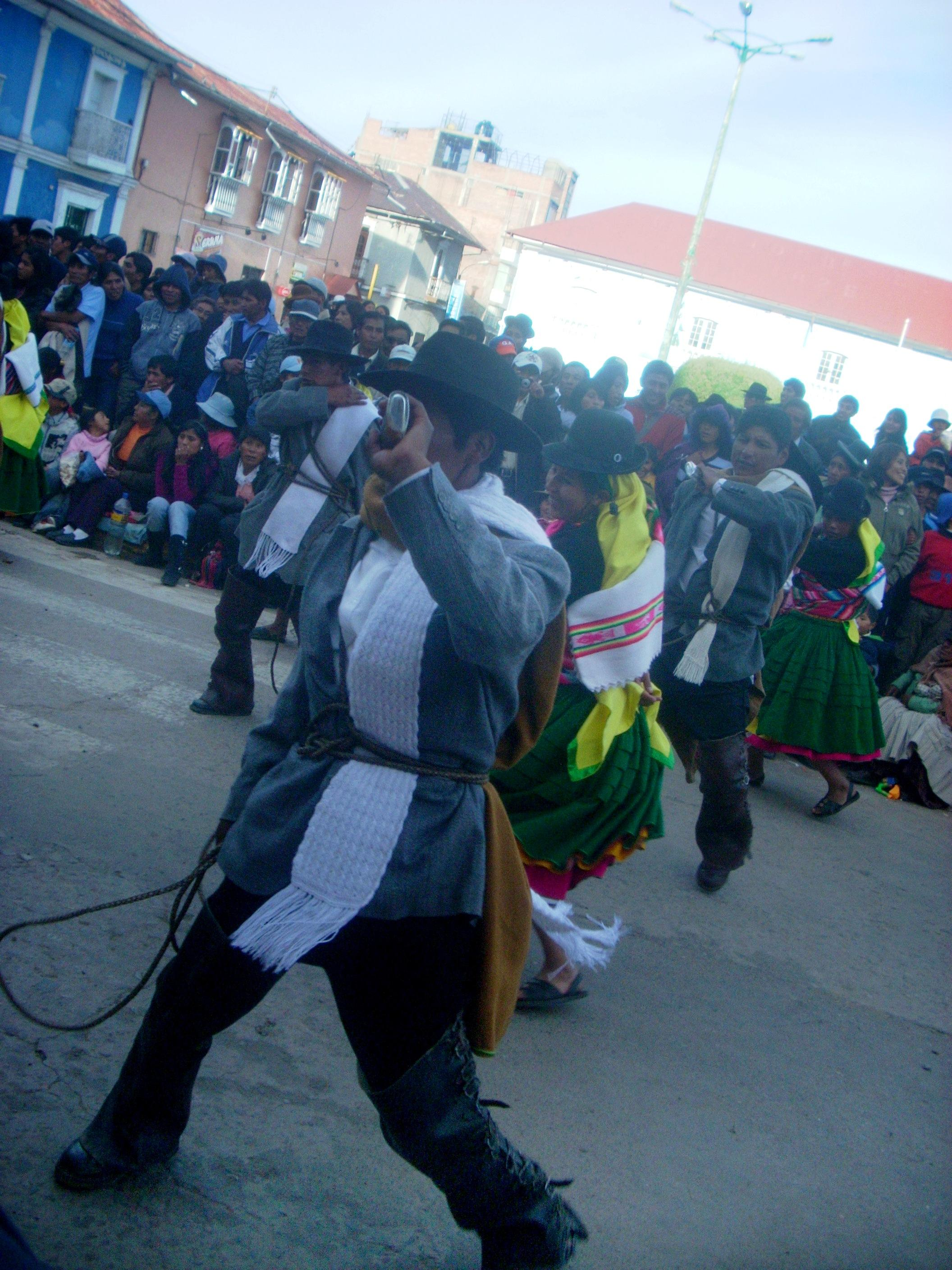
Q'axilu of Pichacani performed in Puno

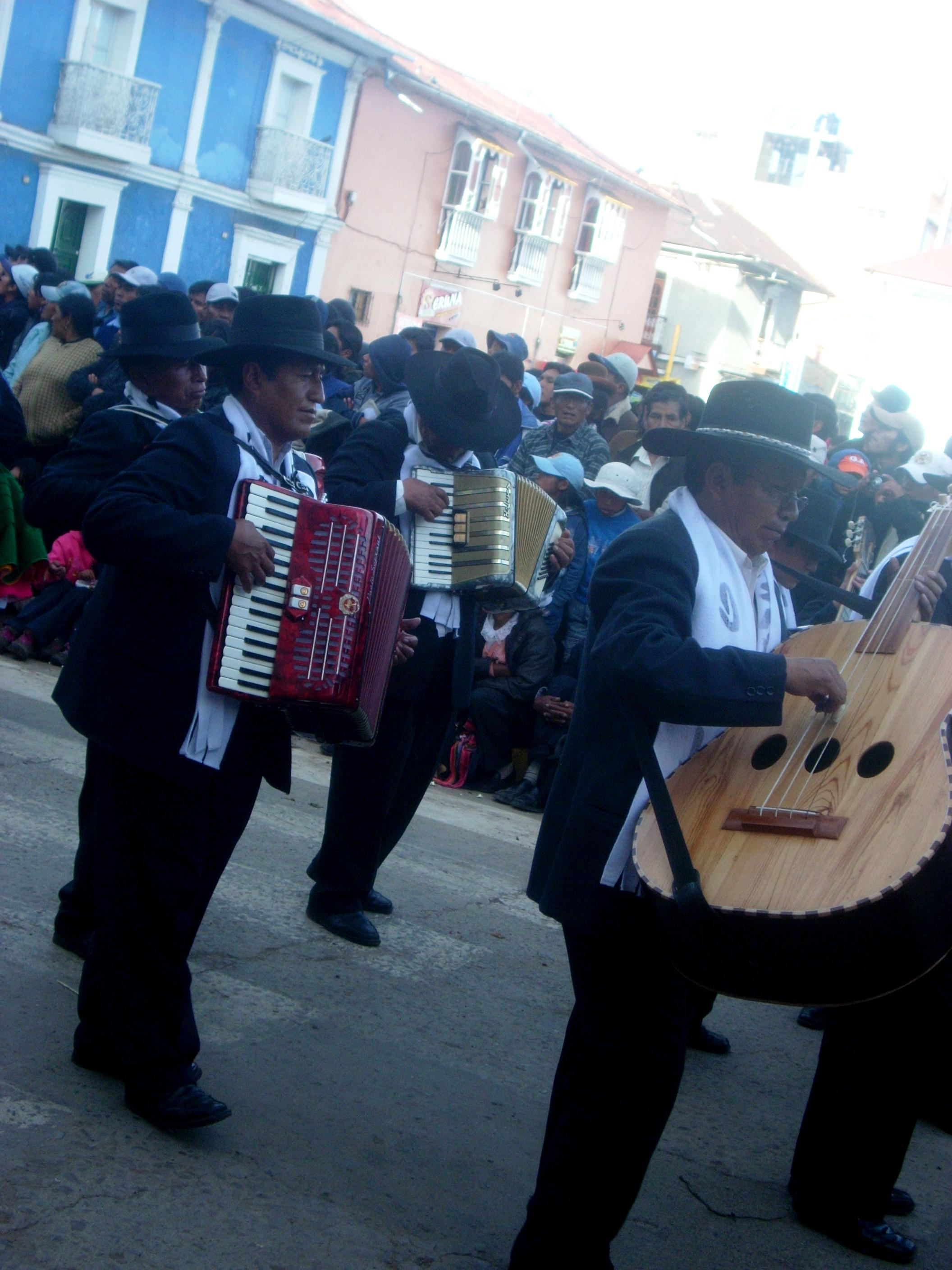
Q'axilu of Pichacani

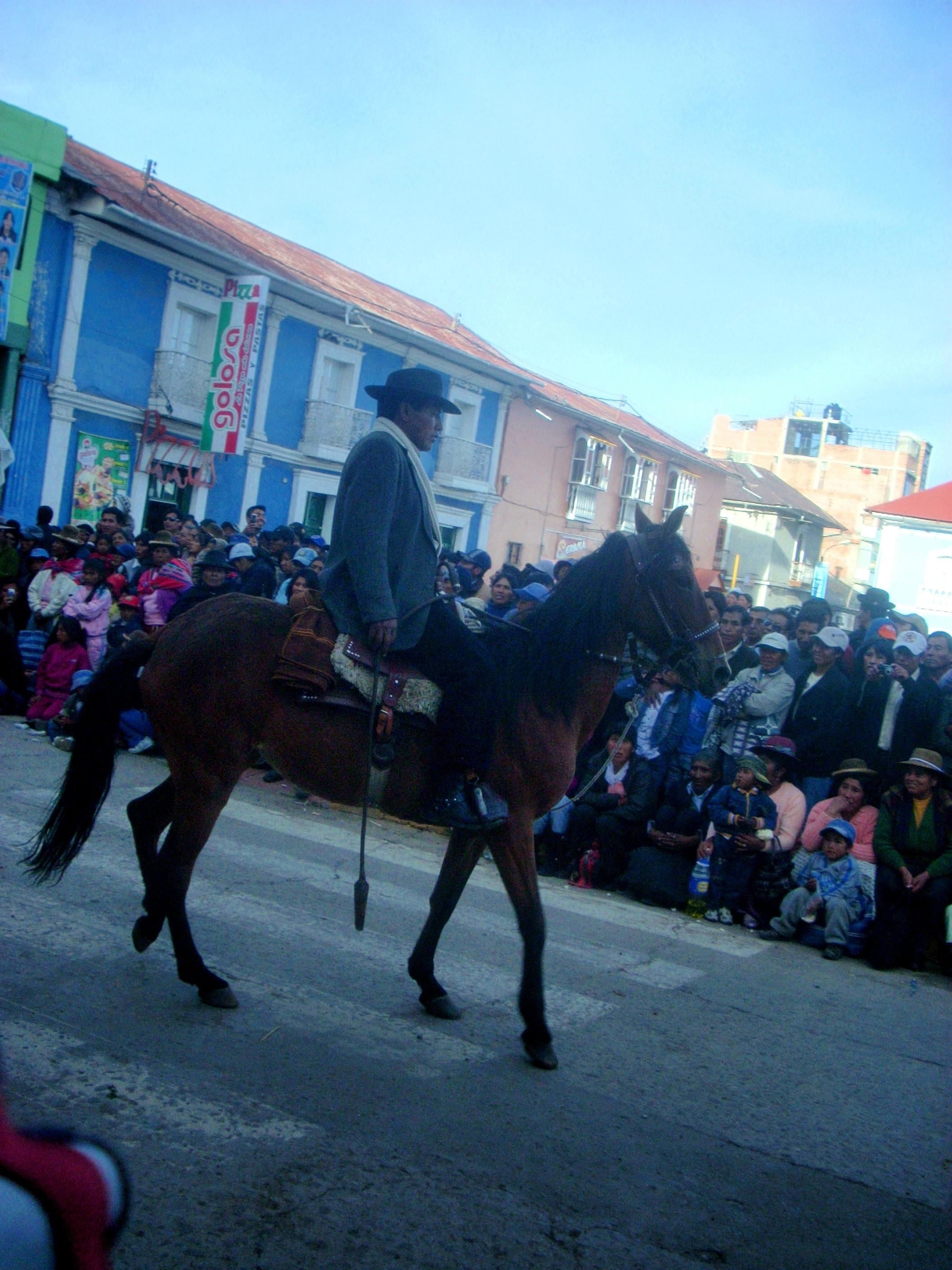
Q'axilu of Pichacani
