= Nor Chichas Province =

Nor Chichas
- Province
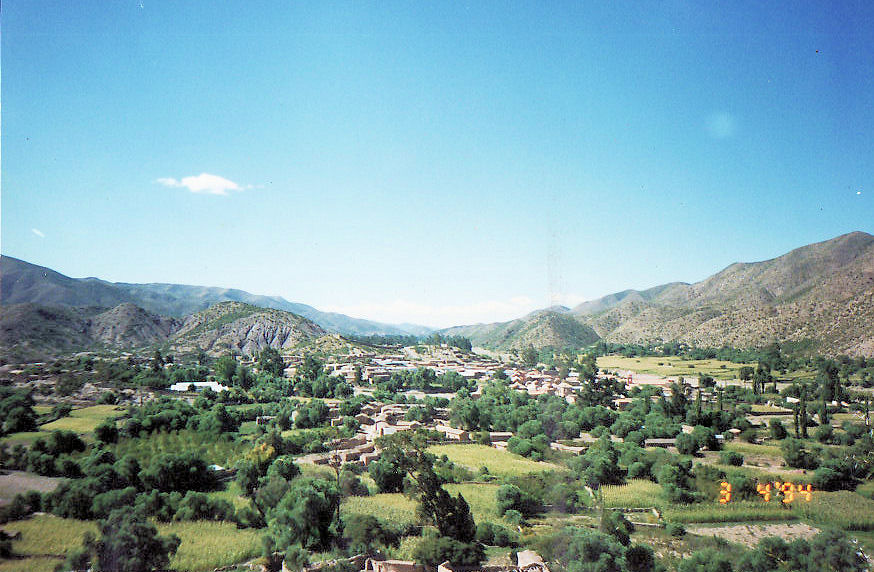
- Vitichi

- Flag Seal

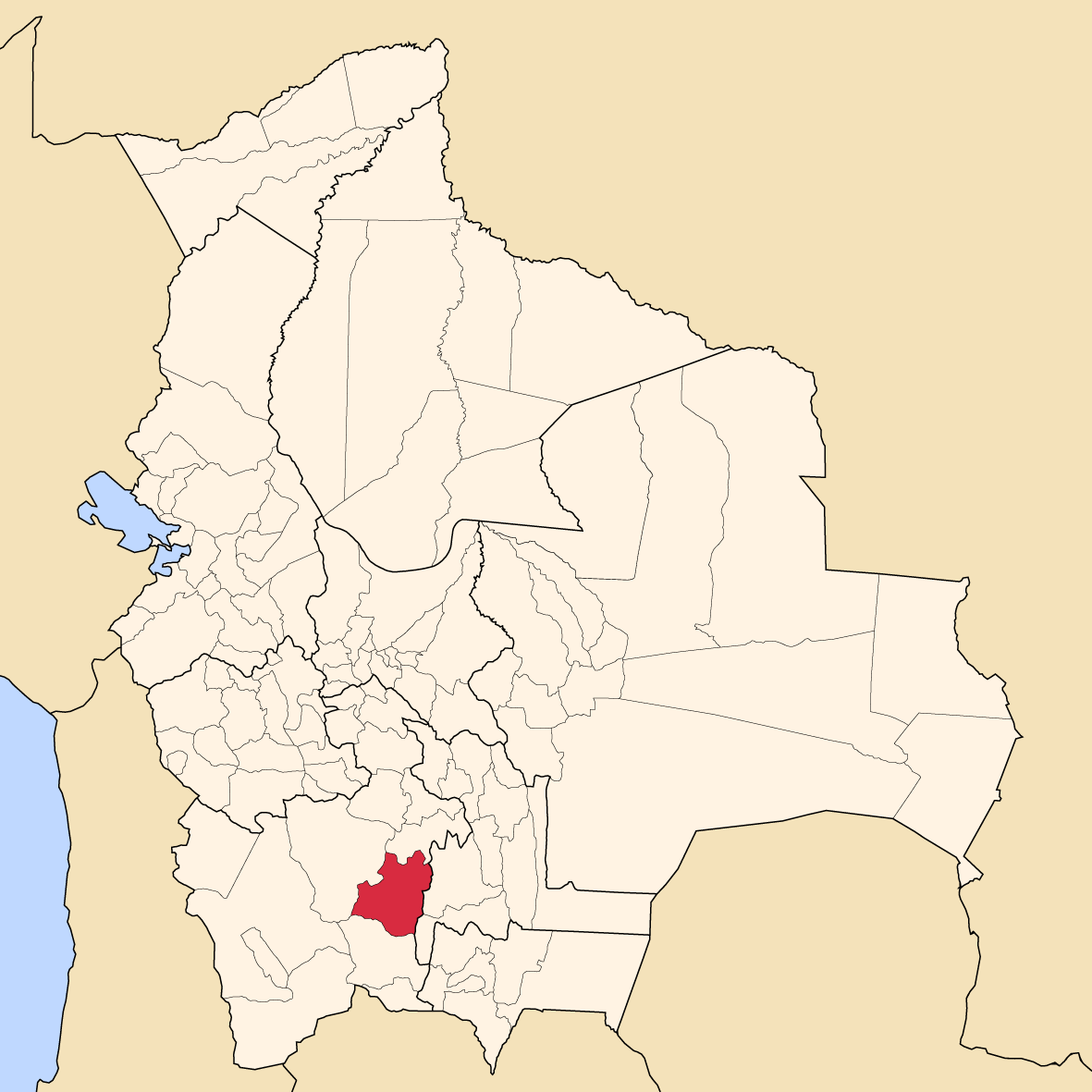
- Location of the Nor Chichas Province within Bolivia

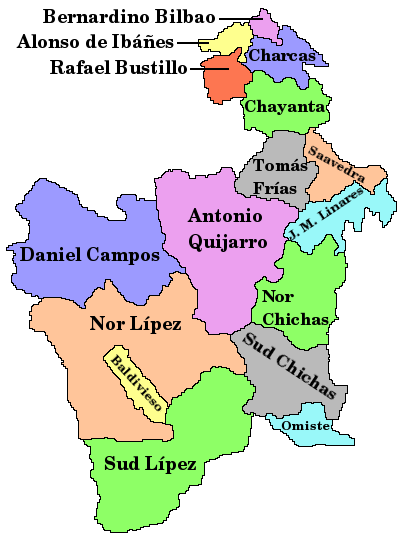
- Provinces of the Potosí Department
- Coordinates: 20°34′0″S 65°45′0″W
- Country: Bolivia
- Department: Potosí Department
- Capital: Cotagaita

Area
  - Total: 3,168 sq mi (8,205 km^{2})

Population (2024 census)
  - Total: 39,172
  - Density: 12.37/sq mi (4.774/km^{2})
  - Ethnicities: Quechua
- Time zone: UTC-4 (BOT)
- Area code: BO.PO.NC

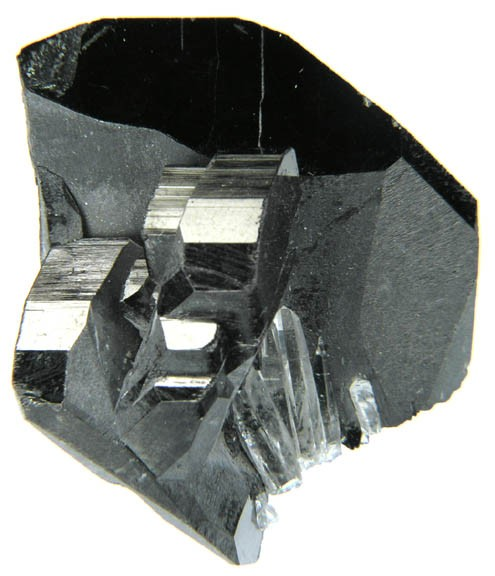
Ferberite on matrix with gemmy quartz, Tazna Mine, Atocha-Quechisla District, Nor Chichas Province.

Nor Chichas is a province in the Eastern parts of the Bolivian Potosí Department. Its seat is Cotagaita.

== Location ==
Nor Chichas province is one of sixteen provinces in the Potosí Department. It is located between 20° 01' and 21° 08' South and between 65° 13' and 66° 17' West. It borders José María Linares Province in the north, Antonio Quijarro Province in the west, Sud Chichas Province in the south, and Chuquisaca Department in the east. The province extends over 120 km from east to west and 140 km from north to south.

== Geography ==
Some of the highest mountains of the province are listed below:

- Achakanayuq
- Apachita Punta
- Ch'aki Qucha
- Ch'api Qullu
- Ch'utu Urqu
- Iskay Rumi
- Iskay Wasi
- Jatun Ch'utu
- Jatun Punta
- Jatun Qaqa
- Jatun Q'asa
- Jatun Rumi
- Jatun Wasi
- Murmuntani
- Muyu Urqu
- Ñaqchayuq
- Ñuñu Urqu
- Palta Urqu
- Puka Muqu
- Puka Punta
- Puka Wayq'u Punta
- Quchayuq
- Qullpani
- Q'asa K'uchu
- Rumi Kancha
- Tarkuni Punta
- Taypi Qhawarina
- T'ika Pallana
- T'ika Wasi
- Waka Wañusqa
- Wanu Wanu
- Wanu Wanuyuq
- Wayra Wasi
- Wisk'achani
- Yana Muqu
- Yana Qaqa
- Yana Unu
- Yana Wintu
- Yaritayuq
- Yaritayuq Punta
- Yuraq Punta
- Yuraq P'ukru

== Division ==
The province comprises two municipalities which are further subdivided into cantons.

Section	Municipality	Seat
1st	Cotagaita Municipality	Cotagaita
2nd	Vitichi Municipality	Vitichi

== Population ==
The main language of the province is Quechua, spoken by 99.5%, while 69% of the population speak Spanish. The population dropped from 38,250 inhabitants (1992 census) to 35,323 (2001 census), a decrease of 17%.

92% of the population have no access to electricity, 87% have no sanitary facilities. 73% of the population are employed in agriculture, 4.5% in mining, 4% in industry, 18.5% in general services. 79% of the population are Catholics, 17% Protestants. 55% of the population are female.

The people are predominantly indigenous citizens of Quechua descent.

Ethnic group	Cotagaita Municipality (%)	Vitichi Municipality (%)
Quechua	89.2	90.4
Aymara	0.7	0.2
Guaraní, Chiquitos, Moxos	0.1	0.0
Not indigenous	9.4	9.3
Other indigenous groups	0.6	0.1
