= Palta Urqu =

Mountain in Bolivia

- Location within Bolivia

Highest point
- Elevation: 3,760 m (12,340 ft)
- Coordinates: 20°53′02″S 66°11′37″W

Geography
- Location: Bolivia; Potosí Department
- Parent range: Andes

Palta Urqu (Quechua palta avocado, urqu mountain, "avocado mountain", also spelled Palta Orkho) is a mountain in the Andes of Bolivia which reaches a height of approximately 3,760 m (12,340 ft). It is located in the Potosí Department, Nor Chichas Province, Cotagaita Municipality. Palta Urqu lies at the Atocha River, southwest of the village of Quechisla.
