= Jichu Qullu (Peru) =

Mountain in Peru

- Location within Peru

Highest point
- Elevation: 5,025 m (16,486 ft)
- Coordinates: 16°12′55″S 70°36′28″W

Geography
- Location: Moquegua Region
- Parent range: Andes

Jichu Qullu (Aymara jichu ichhu (Peruvian feather grass), qullu mountain, "ichhu mountain", Hispanicized spelling Icho Ccollo) is a 5,025-metre-high (16,486 ft) mountain in the Andes of Peru. It is situated in the Moquegua Region, General Sanchez Cerro Province, in the districts Ichuña and Yunga. Jichu Qullu lies southwest of Wankarani and northwest of Machuyuq (Machuyoc) and Pachakutiq.
