= Jatun Rumi =

Mountain in Bolivia

- Location within Bolivia

Highest point
- Elevation: 4,360 m (14,300 ft)
- Coordinates: 20°53′12″S 65°57′33″W

Geography
- Location: Bolivia; Potosí Department
- Parent range: Andes

Jatun Rumi (Quechua jatun big, rumi stone, "big stone") is a mountain in the Andes of Bolivia which reaches a height of approximately 4,360 m (14,300 ft). It is located in the Potosí Department, Nor Chichas Province, Cotagaita Municipality.
