= Yana Muqu =

Mountain in Bolivia

- Location within Bolivia

Highest point
- Elevation: 3,893 m (12,772 ft)
- Coordinates: 20°58′55″S 65°46′32″W

Geography
- Location: Bolivia; Potosí Department
- Parent range: Andes

Yana Muqu, or Yana Mokho (Quechua yana "black" + muqu "hill", "black hill"), is a 3,893 m (12,772 ft) mountain in the Andes of Bolivia. It is located in the Potosí Department, Nor Chichas Province, Cotagaita Municipality.
