= Ichuña District =

Coordinates: 16.1406°S 70.5357°W

Ichuña
- District
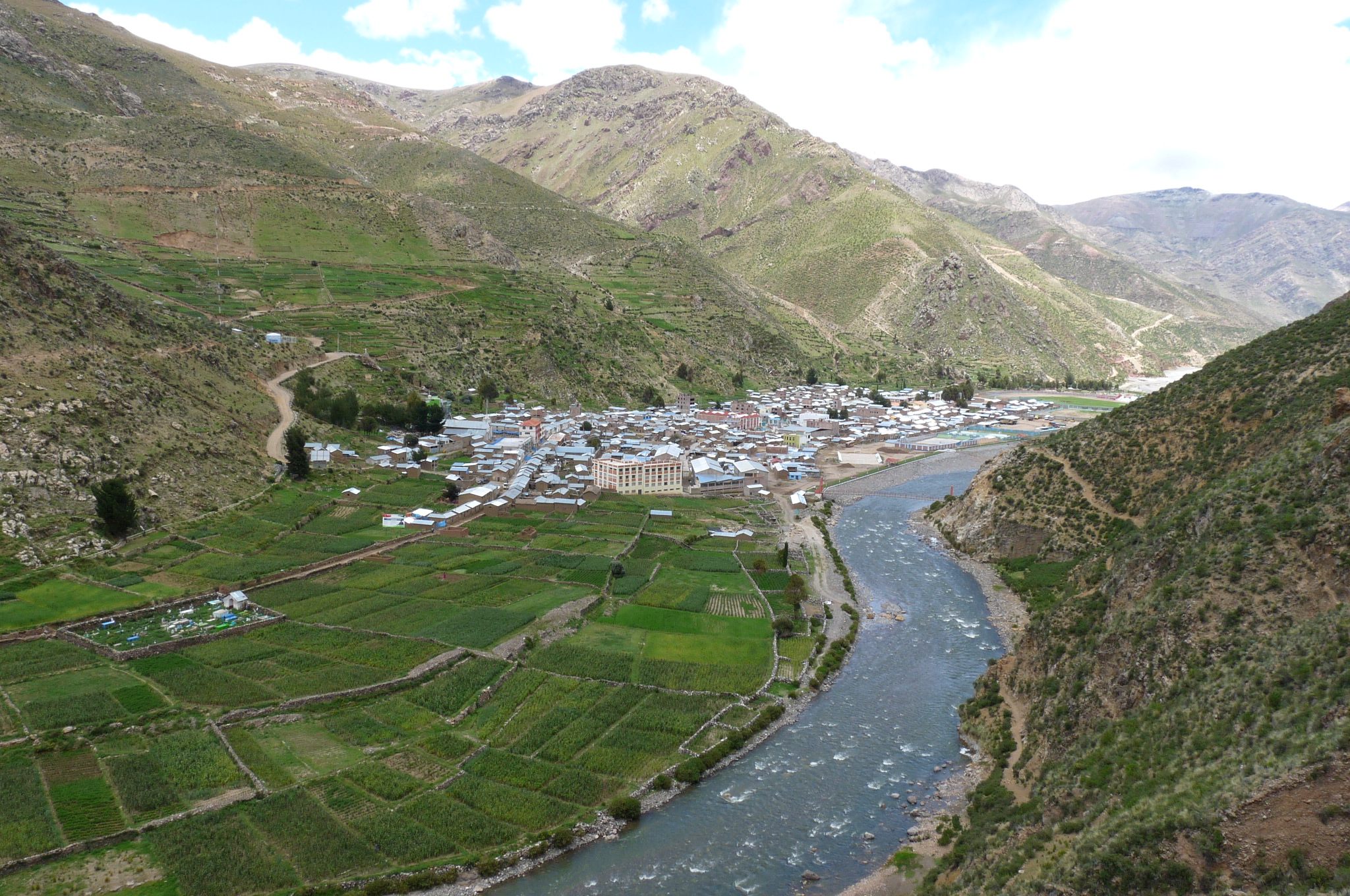
- Ichuña
- Interactive map of Ichuña
- Country: Peru
- Region: Moquegua
- Province: General Sánchez Cerro
- Founded: January 2, 1857
- Capital: Ichuña

Government
  - Mayor: Melecio Eleusipo Flores Ventura

Area
  - Total: 1,017.74 km^{2} (392.95 sq mi)
- Elevation: 3,756 m (12,323 ft)

Population (2005 census)
  - Total: 3,782
  - Density: 3.716/km^{2} (9.625/sq mi)
- Time zone: UTC-5 (PET)
- UBIGEO: 180204

Ichuña District is one of eleven districts of the General Sánchez Cerro Province in Peru.

== Geography ==
Some of the highest peaks of the district are listed below:

- Allqamarini
- Aqu Pata
- Chuqipata
- Churi Wiqu
- Ch'iyar Jaqhi
- Ch'unch'uni
- Hatun Janq'u Pillu
- Janq'u Saxa
- Jaqhi Jaqhini
- Jat'u K'achi
- Jichu Qullu
- Kimsa Chata
- Kuntur Nasa
- Kuntur Sayana
- Kutimpu
- Larama Quta
- Llallawa
- Machuyuq
- Millu
- Pachakutiq
- Pichaqani
- Pinkillu
- Pukara
- Puma Wachana
- Pura Purani
- Qañiwa
- Qayqu
- Qañawiri
- Qaqawarayuq
- Q'ulini
- Rukutuni
- Santa Wara Wani
- Saya Muqu
- Taruj Sallani
- T'ula Pampa
- T'ula Qullu
- Uqi Muqu
- Uturunqani (Ichuña)
- Uturunqani (Moquegua-Puno)
- Wallqani
- Wanqarani
- Wari Kunka
- Wari Pukara
- Wayllani
- Wila Qullu
- Wila Sirka
- Wit'u Punta
- Yura Q'asa

== Ethnic groups ==
The people in the district are mainly indigenous citizens of Quechua descent. Quechua is the language which the majority of the population (79.61%) learnt to speak in childhood, 12.86% of the residents started speaking using the Spanish language (2007 Peru Census).

== Climate ==
Climate data for Ichuña, elevation 3,778 m (12,395 ft), (1991–2020)
Month	Jan	Feb	Mar	Apr	May	Jun	Jul	Aug	Sep	Oct	Nov	Dec	Year
Mean daily maximum °C (°F)	19.6 (67.3)	19.5 (67.1)	20.0 (68.0)	20.1 (68.2)	19.5 (67.1)	18.9 (66.0)	18.6 (65.5)	19.8 (67.6)	20.6 (69.1)	21.9 (71.4)	22.6 (72.7)	21.4 (70.5)	20.2 (68.4)
Mean daily minimum °C (°F)	5.8 (42.4)	6.0 (42.8)	5.4 (41.7)	3.4 (38.1)	−0.2 (31.6)	−2.3 (27.9)	−2.3 (27.9)	−1.3 (29.7)	0.7 (33.3)	2.4 (36.3)	3.2 (37.8)	5.0 (41.0)	2.2 (35.9)
Average precipitation mm (inches)	135.4 (5.33)	132.4 (5.21)	82.7 (3.26)	34.5 (1.36)	3.2 (0.13)	1.8 (0.07)	2.4 (0.09)	5.0 (0.20)	8.0 (0.31)	16.7 (0.66)	27.4 (1.08)	78.6 (3.09)	528.1 (20.79)
Source: National Meteorology and Hydrology Service of Peru

== See also ==
- Jukumarini Lake
