= General Sánchez Cerro province =

Coordinates: 16°40′27″S 70°58′13″W

General Sánchez Cerro
- Province
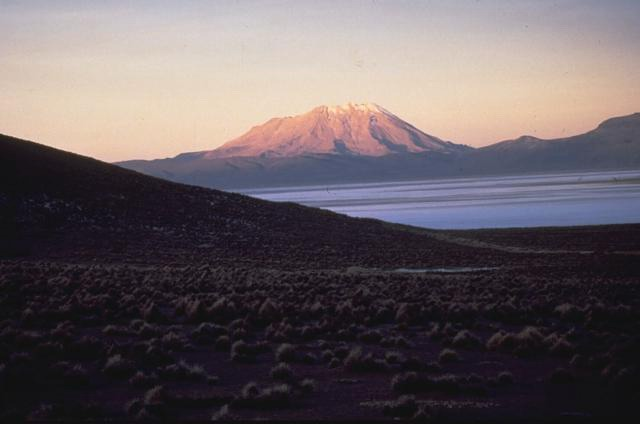
- Ubinas volcano in the province of General Sánchez Cerro

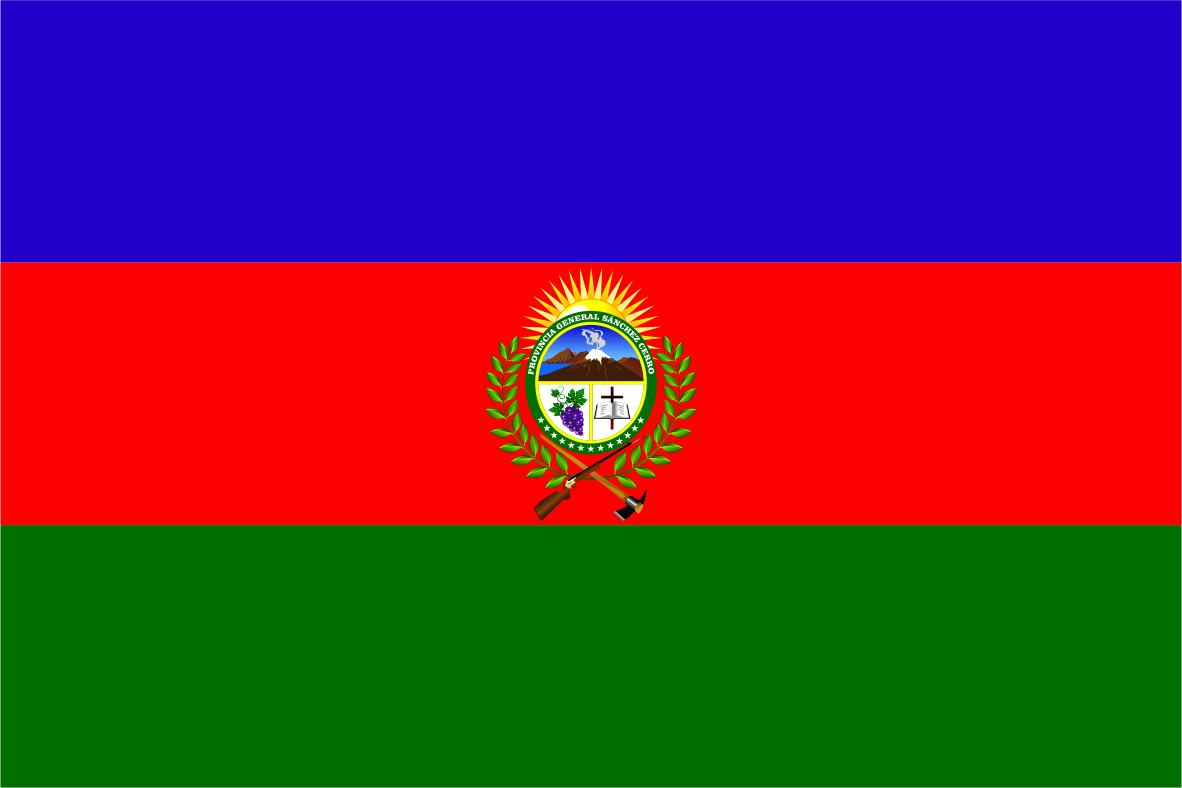
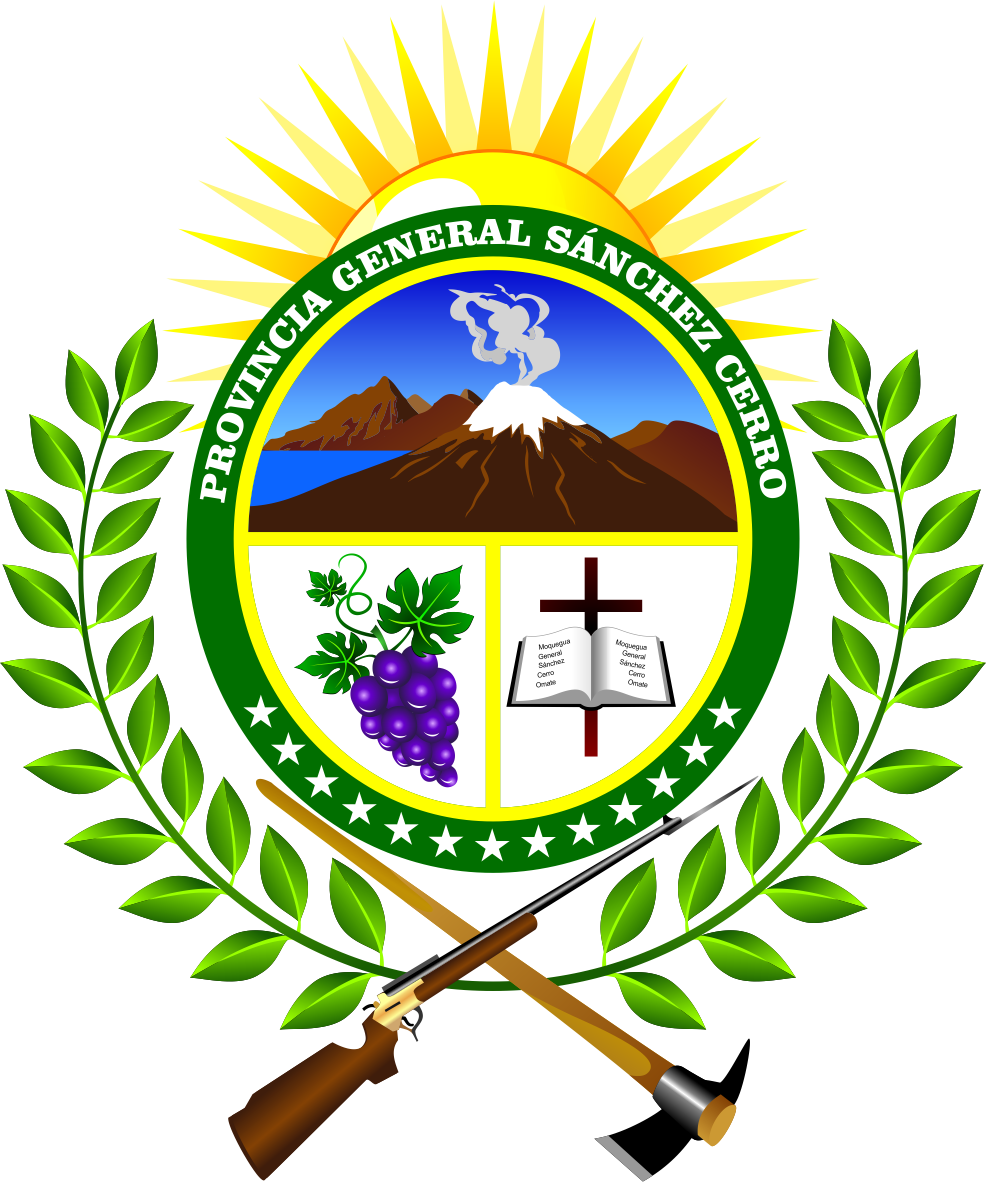
- Flag Coat of arms

- Location of General Sánchez Cerro in the Moquegua Region
- Country: Peru
- Region: Moquegua
- Capital: Omate

Government
  - Mayor: Mauricio Jose Nina Juarez (2007)

Area
  - Total: 5,681.71 km^{2} (2,193.72 sq mi)
- Elevation: 2,166 m (7,106 ft)

Population
  - Total: 25,809
  - Density: 4.5425/km^{2} (11.765/sq mi)
- UBIGEO: 1802

General Sánchez Cerro, known as Puquina until 1936, is the smallest of three provinces in the Moquegua Region of Peru. The capital of the province is Omate. The province was named after the former Peruvian army officer and president Luis Miguel Sánchez Cerro.

== Boundaries ==
- North: Arequipa Region
- East: Puno Region
- South: province of Mariscal Nieto
- West: Arequipa Region

== Geography ==
One of the highest peaks of the province is the Ubinas volcano. Other mountains are listed below:

- Allqamarini
- Chuqipata
- Churi Wiqu
- Ch'allapata
- Ch'iyar Jaqhi
- Ch'unch'uni
- Hatun P'ukru
- Janq'u Saxa
- Jaqhi Jaqhini
- Jat'u K'achi
- Jichu Qullu
- Larama Quta
- Llallawa
- Llaqtayuq
- Kunturini
- Millu
- Minasniyuq
- Misiwa
- Pachakutiq (Arequipa-M.)
- Pachakutiq (Moquegua)
- Parwayuni
- Pirwa Tira
- Pirwani
- Puka Apachita
- Puka Saya
- Pukara
- Paqu Paquni
- Pura Purani
- P'aqu Urqu
- Qayqu
- Qillqata
- Qullpani
- Qhuyu Parwayuni
- Q'ulini
- Q'uwa Laki
- Rukutuni
- Suri Wasi
- Takuni
- Taruj Sallani
- Uturunqani (Ichuña)
- Uturunqani (Moquegua-Puno)
- Wallqani
- Wankarani
- Wari Pukara
- Wayllani
- Wila Qullu
- Wila Sirka
- Wila Wilani
- Wilani
- Wit'uni
- Yana Qaqa
- Yawri Salla
- Yuraq Urqu

== Political division ==
The province is divided into eleven districts, which are:

- Omate
- Chojata
- Coalaque
- Ichuña
- La Capilla
- Lloque
- Matalaque
- Puquina
- Quinistaquillas
- Ubinas
- Yunga

== Ethnic groups ==
The province is inhabited by indigenous citizens of Aymara and Quechua descent. Spanish, however, is the language which the majority of the population (60.36%) learnt to speak in childhood, 37.45% of the residents started speaking using the Quechua language and 1.98% using Aymara (2007 Peru Census).

== See also ==
- Jukumarini Lake
