= Chojata District =

Coordinates: 16.3885°S 70.7303°W

Chojata
- District
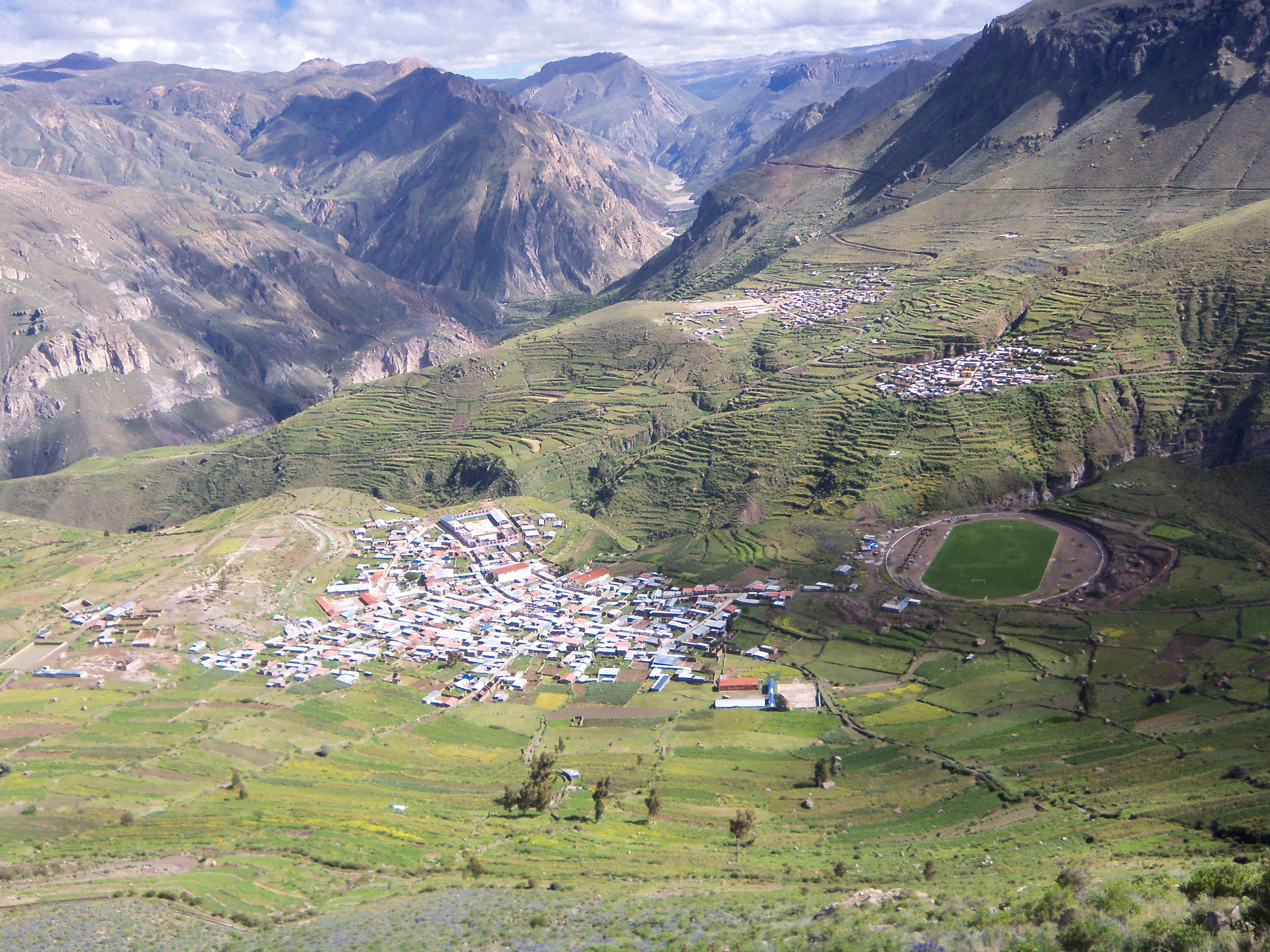
- A view of Chojata and the mountains north and north-west of it
- Interactive map of Chojata
- Country: Peru
- Region: Moquegua
- Province: General Sánchez Cerro
- Founded: February 15, 1955
- Capital: Chojata

Government
  - Mayor: Lucio Maldonado Roque

Area
  - Total: 847.94 km^{2} (327.39 sq mi)
- Elevation: 3,625 m (11,893 ft)

Population (2005 census)
  - Total: 1,986
  - Density: 2.342/km^{2} (6.066/sq mi)
- Time zone: UTC-5 (PET)
- UBIGEO: 180202

Chojata District is one of eleven districts of the General Sánchez Cerro Province in Peru.

== Geography ==
One of the highest peaks of the district is Hatun P'ukru at approximately 5,153 m (16,906 ft). Other mountains are listed below:

- Chachakumani
- Chinchillani
- Ch'alla Pata
- Hatun Pampa
- Hatun Punta
- Iru Urqu
- Kimsa Chata
- Kunturini
- Laq'a Laq'ani
- Llallawi
- Millu Punta
- Misiwa
- Paqu Paquni
- Pata Wasi
- Patilla Suru
- Pirwa Tira
- Puka Apachita
- Pukara
- Putusi
- Phaq'u Q'awa
- P'aqu Urqu
- P'isaqani
- Qarwayuni
- Qullqi Wiqu
- Quncha Pata
- Q'asa Q'asa
- Q'uwata
- Sikuwani
- Surani
- Uqi Salla
- Wari Pukara
- Wila Wila
- Wila Wilani
- Yana Qaqa
- Yawri Salla
- Yuraq Qaqa
- Yuraq Urqu

== Ethnic groups ==
The people in the district are mainly indigenous citizens of Quechua descent. Quechua is the language which the majority of the population (85.33%) learnt to speak in childhood, 10.40% of the residents started speaking using the Spanish language (2007 Peru Census).
