= Waka Wañusqa =

Mountain in the Andes

- Location within Bolivia

Highest point
- Elevation: 4,460 m (14,630 ft)
- Coordinates: 20°52′51″S 65°59′23″W

Geography
- Location: Bolivia; Potosí Department
- Parent range: Andes

Waka Wañusqa (Quechua waka cow, wañusqa died, dead, "cow died" or "dead cow", also spelled Huaca Huanuskha) is a mountain in the Andes of Bolivia which reaches a height of approximately 4,460 m (14,630 ft). It is located in the Potosí Department, Nor Chichas Province, Cotagaita Municipality.
