= Quinistaquillas District =

Coordinates: 16.7493°S 70.8804°W

Quinistaquillas
- District
- Interactive map of Quinistaquillas
- Country: Peru
- Region: Moquegua
- Province: General Sánchez Cerro
- Founded: June 10, 1955
- Capital: Quinistaquillas

Government
  - Mayor: Eleuterio Caytano Coaquira

Area
  - Total: 193.79 km^{2} (74.82 sq mi)
- Elevation: 1,800 m (5,900 ft)

Population (2005 census)
  - Total: 708
  - Density: 3.65/km^{2} (9.46/sq mi)
- Time zone: UTC-5 (PET)
- UBIGEO: 180209

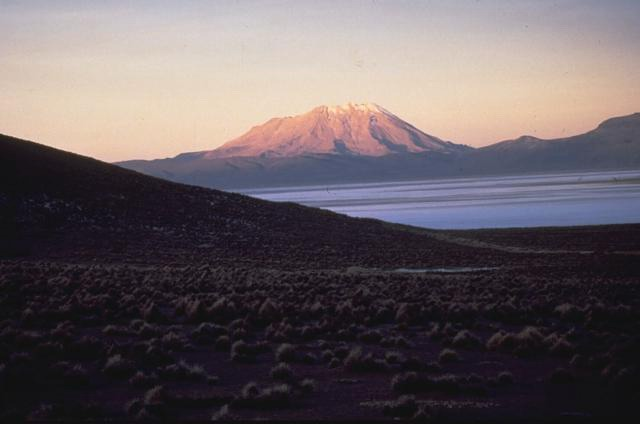
Ubinas volcano, Peru nearby

Quinistaquillas District is one of eleven districts of the province General Sánchez Cerro in Peru.

== Climate ==
Climate data for Quinistaquillas, elevation 1,765 m (5,791 ft), (1991–2020)
Month	Jan	Feb	Mar	Apr	May	Jun	Jul	Aug	Sep	Oct	Nov	Dec	Year
Mean daily maximum °C (°F)	30.1 (86.2)	29.4 (84.9)	29.9 (85.8)	29.5 (85.1)	29.0 (84.2)	28.4 (83.1)	28.3 (82.9)	29.5 (85.1)	30.8 (87.4)	31.3 (88.3)	31.7 (89.1)	31.3 (88.3)	29.9 (85.9)
Mean daily minimum °C (°F)	13.9 (57.0)	14.1 (57.4)	14.1 (57.4)	12.7 (54.9)	10.7 (51.3)	9.6 (49.3)	9.2 (48.6)	10.5 (50.9)	11.5 (52.7)	12.0 (53.6)	12.2 (54.0)	13.1 (55.6)	12.0 (53.6)
Average precipitation mm (inches)	26.4 (1.04)	36.3 (1.43)	17.2 (0.68)	0.9 (0.04)	0.0 (0.0)	0.1 (0.00)	0.4 (0.02)	0.4 (0.02)	0.5 (0.02)	0.1 (0.00)	0.1 (0.00)	5.0 (0.20)	87.4 (3.45)
Source: National Meteorology and Hydrology Service of Peru
