= Vitichi =

- Town
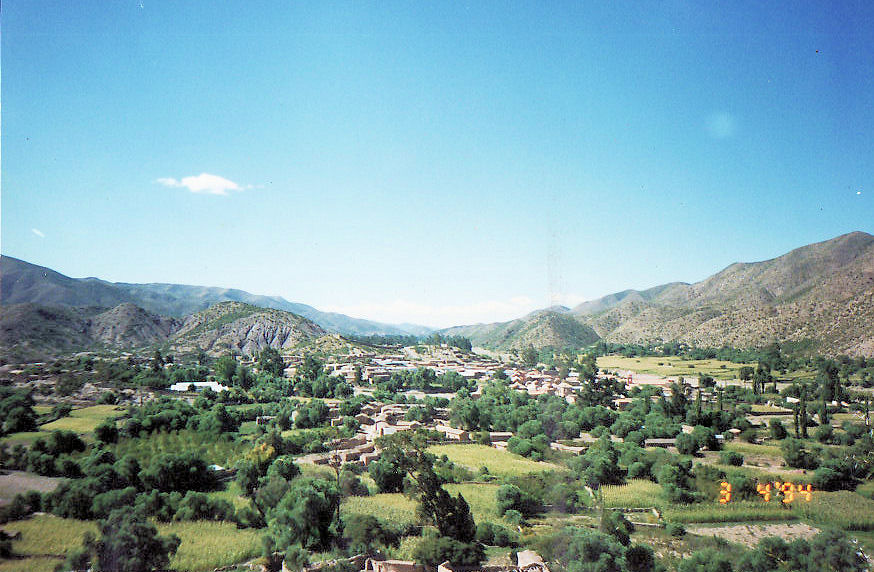

- Location within Bolivia
- Coordinates: 20°13′S 65°29′W
- Country: Bolivia
- Department: Potosí Department
- Province: Nor Chichas Province
- Municipality: Vitichi Municipality
- Canton: Vitichi Canton

Population (2001)
  - Total: 789
- Time zone: UTC-4 (BOT)

Vitichi is a location in the Potosí Department in Bolivia. It is the capital of the Vitichi Municipality, the second municipal section of the Nor Chichas Province.

== Climate ==
Climate data for Vitichi, elevation 3,020 m (9,910 ft), (1974–2007)
Month	Jan	Feb	Mar	Apr	May	Jun	Jul	Aug	Sep	Oct	Nov	Dec	Year
Mean daily maximum °C (°F)	26.1 (79.0)	25.9 (78.6)	25.9 (78.6)	25.9 (78.6)	24.6 (76.3)	22.9 (73.2)	24.8 (76.6)	24.9 (76.8)	26.3 (79.3)	27.4 (81.3)	27.6 (81.7)	26.4 (79.5)	25.7 (78.3)
Daily mean °C (°F)	16.7 (62.1)	16.4 (61.5)	16.1 (61.0)	15.6 (60.1)	13.0 (55.4)	11.6 (52.9)	12.6 (54.7)	13.1 (55.6)	15.1 (59.2)	16.7 (62.1)	17.1 (62.8)	16.6 (61.9)	15.0 (59.1)
Mean daily minimum °C (°F)	7.3 (45.1)	7.1 (44.8)	6.4 (43.5)	5.4 (41.7)	1.4 (34.5)	0.3 (32.5)	0.5 (32.9)	1.3 (34.3)	3.8 (38.8)	6.0 (42.8)	6.7 (44.1)	6.8 (44.2)	4.4 (39.9)
Average precipitation mm (inches)	92.5 (3.64)	80.0 (3.15)	50.1 (1.97)	14.5 (0.57)	2.7 (0.11)	1.0 (0.04)	0.3 (0.01)	3.0 (0.12)	5.9 (0.23)	17.7 (0.70)	29.6 (1.17)	72.4 (2.85)	369.7 (14.56)
Average precipitation days	10.8	9.3	7.0	2.7	0.6	0.2	0.1	0.4	0.9	3.0	4.2	9.0	48.2
Source: Servicio Nacional de Meteorología e Hidrología de Bolivia
