= Pachakutiq (Moquegua) =

Mountain in Peru

- Location within Peru

Highest point
- Elevation: 4,800 m (15,700 ft)
- Coordinates: 16°14′12″S 70°35′22″W

Geography
- Location: Peru, Moquegua Region
- Parent range: Andes

Pachakutiq (Quechua pacha time, space, kuti return, "return of time", "change of time", pacha kuti "great change or disturbance in the social or political order", -q a suffix, Pachakutiq an Inca emperor, Hispanicized spelling Pachacutec) is a mountain in the Andes of southern Peru, about 4,800 metres (15,748 ft) high. It is situated in the Moquegua Region, General Sánchez Cerro Province, on the border of the districts Ichuña, Lloque and Yunga. Pachakutiq lies southeast of the mountain Jichu Qullu.
