= Santiago de Cotagaita =

Cotagaita
- Town
- Location within Bolivia
- Coordinates: 20°49′S 65°40′W
- Country: Bolivia
- Department: Potosí Department
- Province: Nor Chichas Province
- Municipality: Cotagaita Municipality
- Canton: Cotagaita Canton
- Elevation: 8,660 ft (2,640 m)

Population (2001)
  - Total: 1,645
- Time zone: UTC-4 (BOT)

Cotagaita is a small town in Bolivia. In 2009, it had an estimated population of 1904.

Cotagaita (also: Santiago de Cotagaita) is a country town in the Potosí Department in Bolivia. The village was founded in 1570.

== Location ==
Cotagaita is central to the municipality of Cotagaita and the capital of the province of Nor Chichas. Cotagaita lies at an altitude of 2640 meters on the Río Cotagaita, an inflow of the Rio Pilcomayo.

== Geography ==
Cotagaita is located in the southern part of the barren plateau of the Bolivian Altiplano. The climate is cool and dry due to the inland location and is characterized by a typical daytime climate, in which the temperature fluctuations between day and night are usually significantly larger than the seasonal fluctuations.

The average annual temperature is 15 °C and varies only slightly between 11 °C in June / July and 18 °C in December and January. The annual rainfall is only about 300 mm, with a strong dry season from April to October with monthly rainfall below 10 mm, and a wet season from December to February with 70-80 mm monthly rainfall.

=== Climate ===
Climate data for Santiago de Cotagaita (Mosojllajta), elevation 2,620 m (8,600 ft), (1990–2008)
Month	Jan	Feb	Mar	Apr	May	Jun	Jul	Aug	Sep	Oct	Nov	Dec	Year
Record high °C (°F)	31.5 (88.7)	31.3 (88.3)	31.3 (88.3)	31.0 (87.8)	30.6 (87.1)	27.6 (81.7)	28.1 (82.6)	29.6 (85.3)	31.5 (88.7)	32.3 (90.1)	33.1 (91.6)	32.4 (90.3)	33.1 (91.6)
Mean daily maximum °C (°F)	27.5 (81.5)	27.4 (81.3)	27.4 (81.3)	27.9 (82.2)	26.2 (79.2)	24.2 (75.6)	25.1 (77.2)	26.1 (79.0)	27.9 (82.2)	29.0 (84.2)	29.2 (84.6)	28.9 (84.0)	27.2 (81.0)
Daily mean °C (°F)	19.5 (67.1)	19.3 (66.7)	18.6 (65.5)	16.1 (61.0)	12.1 (53.8)	9.5 (49.1)	10.0 (50.0)	12.2 (54.0)	14.9 (58.8)	17.9 (64.2)	19.2 (66.6)	19.9 (67.8)	15.8 (60.4)
Mean daily minimum °C (°F)	11.5 (52.7)	11.1 (52.0)	9.5 (49.1)	4.2 (39.6)	−2.9 (26.8)	−5.3 (22.5)	−5.0 (23.0)	−1.5 (29.3)	2.3 (36.1)	6.9 (44.4)	9.2 (48.6)	10.7 (51.3)	4.2 (39.6)
Record low °C (°F)	7.1 (44.8)	7.2 (45.0)	4.4 (39.9)	−2.4 (27.7)	−8.3 (17.1)	−10.4 (13.3)	−10.3 (13.5)	−7.4 (18.7)	−4.1 (24.6)	−0.1 (31.8)	4.2 (39.6)	5.4 (41.7)	−10.4 (13.3)
Average precipitation mm (inches)	100.4 (3.95)	60.4 (2.38)	45.8 (1.80)	5.3 (0.21)	0.2 (0.01)	0.1 (0.00)	0.0 (0.0)	1.6 (0.06)	4.9 (0.19)	10.9 (0.43)	13.9 (0.55)	39.9 (1.57)	283.4 (11.15)
Source: Municipal de Cotagaita

== Transportation ==
Cotagaita is 240 kilometers south of Potosí, the capital of the Potosí Department.

From Potosí, the road Route 1, which leads from Lake Titicaca in a southeasterly direction to the Argentine border, leads over 37 kilometers to Cuchu Ingenio . From there, Route 7 branches off to the south and reaches Vitoti and Tumusla after 203 kilometers to Cotagaita.

The city of Tupiza is about 83 kilometers further south . There are no paved traffic routes in the east-west direction.

== Population ==
The population of the village has increased by almost half in the past two decades:

Year	Residents	Source
1992	1,401	Census
2001	1,645	Census
2012	3,931	Census

The population of the region is mostly made up of the Quechua people, 96.1 percent of the inhabitants in the municipality of Cotagaita speak the Quechua language.

== Natural disasters ==
On February 6, 2020, heavy rainfall in the region resulted in catastrophic flooding from the river of the same name. Several hundred houses were destroyed and around a third of the population was affected.
