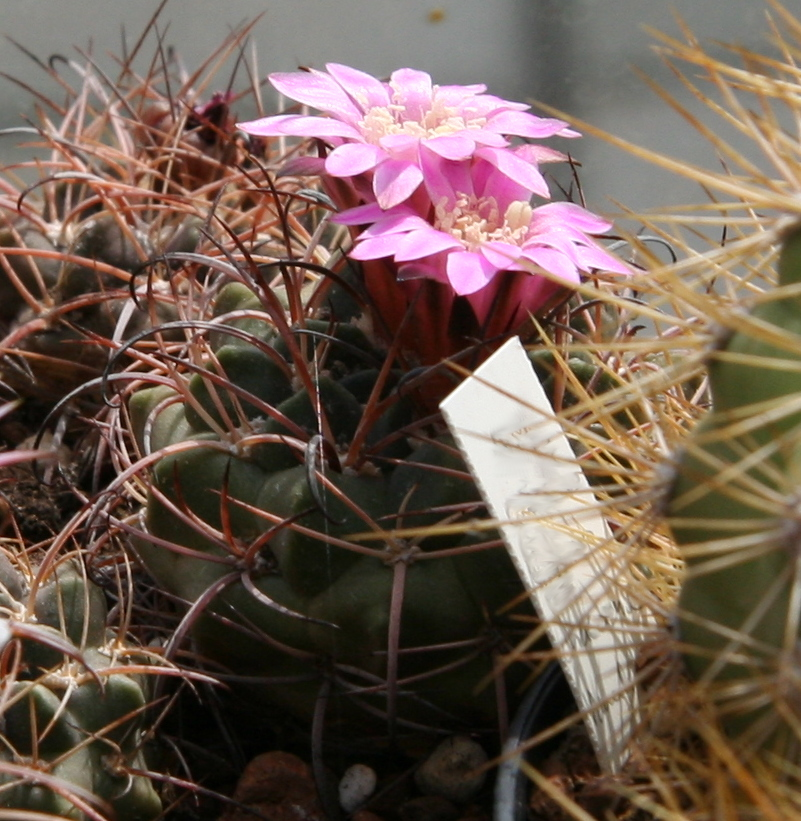

Conservation status
- Least Concern (IUCN 3.1)

Scientific classification
- Kingdom: Plantae
- Clade: Tracheophytes
- Clade: Angiosperms
- Clade: Eudicots
- Order: Caryophyllales
- Family: Cactaceae
- Subfamily: Cactoideae
- Genus: Neowerdermannia
- Species: N. chilensis

Binomial name
- Neowerdermannia chilensis Backeb., 1936

= Neowerdermannia chilensis =

Species of cactus

Neowerdermannia chilensis is a species of Neowerdermannia found in Argentina, Bolivia, Chile, and Peru.

== Description ==
Neowerdermannia chilensis grows with spherical to depressed spherical, dark grey-green to bluish green shoots. The 13 to 22 humped ribs are somewhat widened around the areoles. The single stiff, protruding and unhooked central spine is brown to black. The up to 20 flexible and more or less grey-pink radial spines become darker with age. They are 8 to 22 millimeters long. The bottom of them is the longest and sometimes hooked.

The white to yellowish white flowers are 2 to 2.8 inches long.

== Distribution ==
Neowerdermannia chilensis is common in Peru and northern Chile in the Andes at altitudes of 3200 to 4200 meters.

== Taxonomy ==
The first description was in 1936 by Curt Backeberg. Nomenclatural synonyms are Weingartia chilensis (Backeb.) Backeb. (1963) and Sulcorebutia chilensis (Backeb.) F.H. Brandt (1976). Taxonomic synonyms are Neowerdermannia peruviana F.Ritter (1981) and Neowerdermannia chilensis subsp. peruviana (F.Ritter) Ostolaza (1998).
