= San Antonio District, Puno =

Coordinates: 16.0986°S 70.5583°W

San Antonio de Esquilache District
- District
- Interactive map of San Antonio de Esquilache District
- Country: Peru
- Region: Puno
- Province: Puno
- Capital: San Antonio de Esquilache

Government
  - Mayor: Teodoro Cipriano Ticona Alvarez

Area
  - Total: 376.75 km^{2} (145.46 sq mi)
- Elevation: 4,700 m (15,400 ft)

Population (2005 census)
  - Total: 1,613
  - Density: 4.281/km^{2} (11.09/sq mi)
- Time zone: UTC-5 (PET)
- UBIGEO: 210113

San Antonio District or San Antonio de Esquilache District is one of fifteen districts of the Puno Province in the Puno Region of Peru.

== Geography ==
Some of the highest mountains of the district are listed below:

- Ajuyani
- Anta Qayqu
- Anta Sallani
- Chuqipata
- Jat'u K'achi
- Kuntur Ikiña
- Kunturiri
- Llallawini
- Millu
- Ninachiri
- Q'isanani
- Surichata
- Tankani
- Pukara
- Pura Purani
- Putuni
- Putusi
- Qutuni
- Surichata
- Tankani
- T'ula Qullu
- Wankarani
- Wila Salla

== Ethnic groups ==
The people in the district are mainly indigenous citizens of Quechua descent. Quechua is the language which the majority of the population (85.94%) learnt to speak in childhood, 8.60% of the residents started speaking using the Aymara language and 5.46% learnt Spanish as the first language (2007 Peru Census).
