= Yuraq P'ukru =

Mountain in Bolivia

- Location within Bolivia

Highest point
- Elevation: 3,920 m (12,860 ft)
- Coordinates: 20°51′42″S 66°11′07″W

Geography
- Location: Bolivia; Potosí Department
- Parent range: Andes

Yuraq P'ukru (Quechua yuraq white, p'ukru hole, pit, gap in a surface, "white hole", also spelled Yuraj Phujro) is a mountain in the Andes of Bolivia which reaches a height of approximately 3,920 m (12,860 ft). It is located in the Potosí Department, Nor Chichas Province, Cotagaita Municipality. Yuraq P'ukru lies at the Atocha River, northwest of the village of Quechisla.
