= La Capilla District =

Coordinates: 16.7570°S 71.1794°W

La Capilla
- District
- Interactive map of La Capilla
- Country: Peru
- Region: Moquegua
- Province: General Sánchez Cerro
- Founded: September 30, 1942
- Capital: La Capilla

Government
  - Mayor: Renato Olin Apaza

Area
  - Total: 776.04 km^{2} (299.63 sq mi)
- Elevation: 1,800 m (5,900 ft)

Population (2005 census)
  - Total: 1,525
  - Density: 1.965/km^{2} (5.090/sq mi)
- Time zone: UTC-5 (PET)
- UBIGEO: 180205

La Capilla District is one of eleven districts of the province General Sánchez Cerro in Peru.
