= Vitichi Municipality =

- Municipality
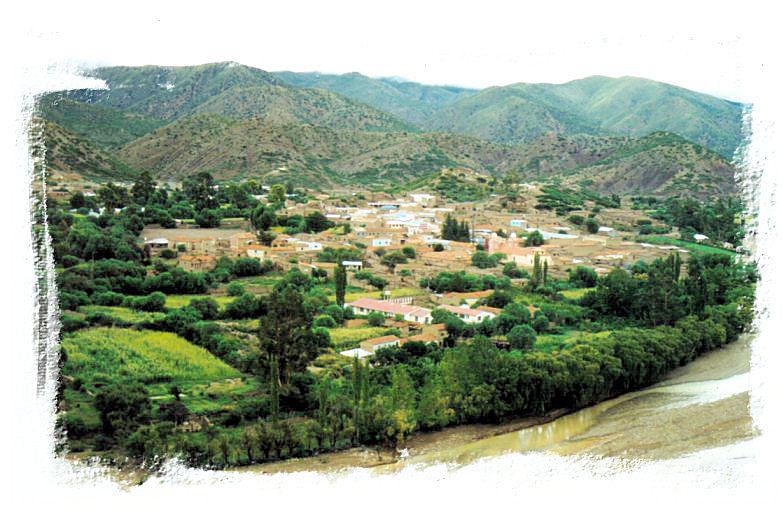
- Vichichi and Vitichi River

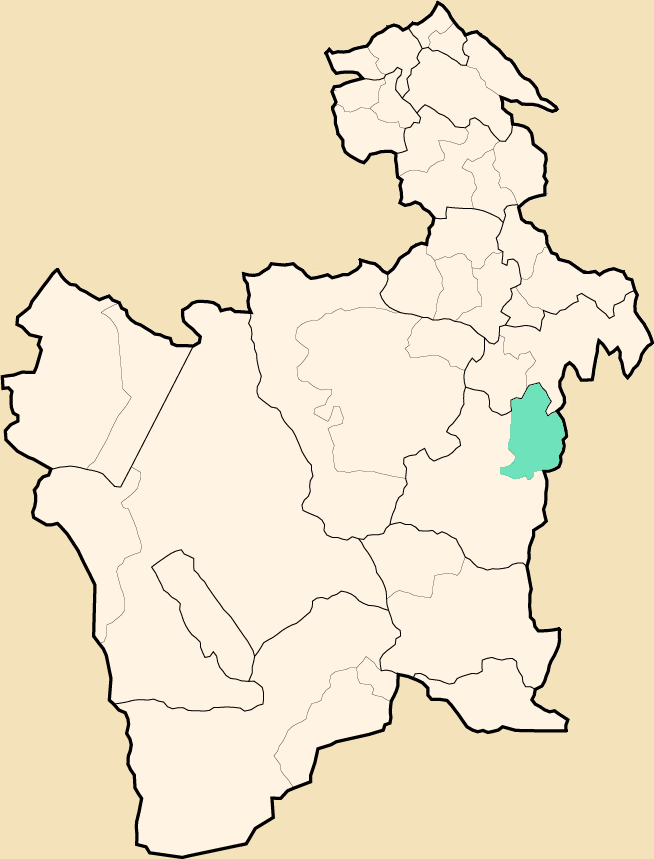
- Location within Potosí Department

- Location within Bolivia
- Coordinates: 20°24′S 65°29′W
- Country: Bolivia
- Department: Potosí Department
- Province: Nor Chichas Province
- Seat: Vitichi
- Elevation: 10,500 ft (3,200 m)

Population (2001)
  - Total: 11,298
  - Ethnicities: Quechua
- Time zone: UTC-4 (BOT)

Vitichi Municipality is the second municipal section of the Nor Chichas Province in the Potosí Department in Bolivia. Its seat is Vitichi.

== Subdivision ==
The municipality consists of the following cantons:

- Ara
- Calcha
- Vitichi
- Yawisla

== The people ==
The people are predominantly indigenous citizens of Quechua descent.

Ethnic group	%
Quechua	90.4
Aymara	0.2
Guaraní, Chiquitos, Moxos	0.0
Not indigenous	9.3
Other indigenous groups	0.1
