= Tacune =

Mountain in Peru

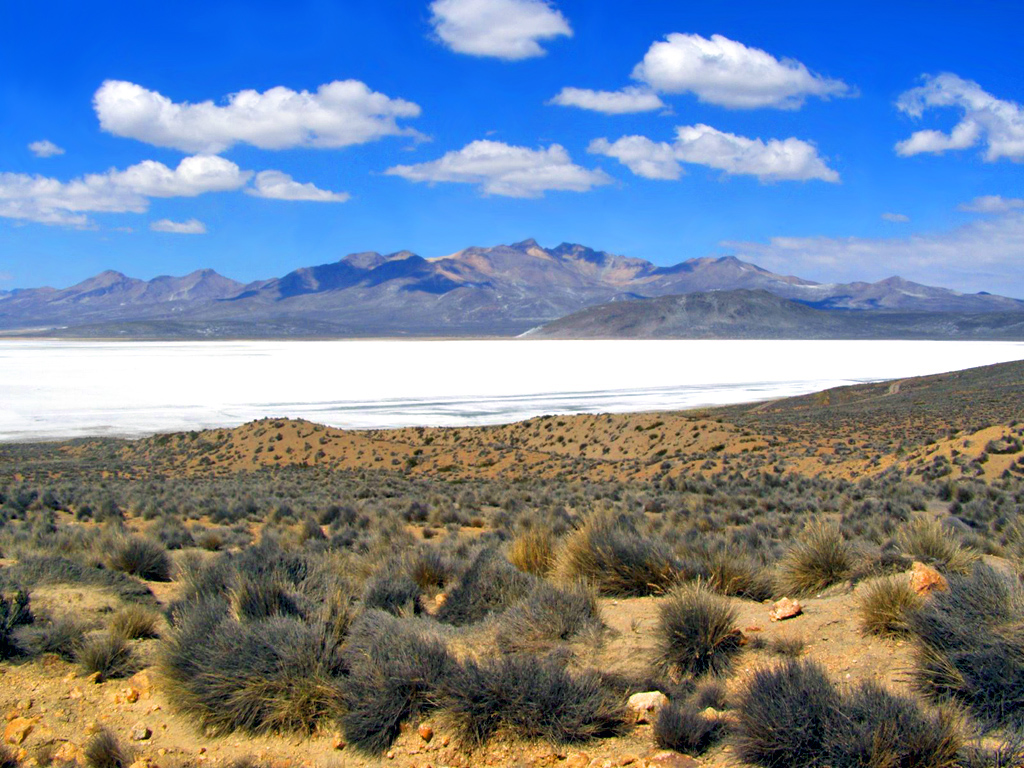
- Lake Salinas with Tacune (center) in the background

Highest point
- Elevation: 5,500 m (18,000 ft)
- Coordinates: 16°28′4″S 71°8′15″W

Geography
- Location within Peru
- Location: Peru, Arequipa Region, Arequipa Province, Moquegua Region, General Sanchez Cerro Province
- Parent range: Andes

Tacune (possibly from Aymara taku Prosopis (genus of South American tree) / colored medicinal earth, -ni a suffix to indicate ownership, "the one with the taku tree" or "the one with medicinal earth") is a mountain in the Andes of Peru, about 5,500 metres (18,045 ft) high. It is situated south of Lake Salinas and east of the mountain Pichu Pichu. Tacune is located in the Arequipa Region, Arequipa Province, Tarucani District, and in the Moquegua Region, General Sánchez Cerro Province, Puquina District.

Tacune is also the name of an intermittent stream which flows from the mountain towards Lake Salinas.

== See also ==
- Pachakutiq
- Qillqata
