= Qutuni (Puno) =

Mountain in Peru

- Location within Peru

Highest point
- Elevation: 5,075 m (16,650 ft)
- Coordinates: 16°04′45″S 70°17′25″W

Geography
- Location: Peru, Puno Region, Puno Province
- Parent range: Andes

Qutuni (Aymara qutu heap, pile, -ni a suffix to indicate ownership, "the one with a heap", Hispanicized spelling Cutune) is a mountain in the Andes of southern Peru, about 5,075 metres (16,650 ft) high. It is situated in the Puno Region, Puno Province, San Antonio District. Qutuni lies northwest of the mountain Wankarani.
