= Matalaque District =

Coordinates: 16.4820°S 70.8262°W

Matalaque
- District
- Interactive map of Matalaque
- Country: Peru
- Region: Moquegua
- Province: General Sánchez Cerro
- Founded: August 28, 1920
- Capital: Matalaque

Government
  - Mayor: Marcos Coaquira Felipe

Area
  - Total: 557.23 km^{2} (215.15 sq mi)
- Elevation: 2,538 m (8,327 ft)

Population (2005 census)
  - Total: 1,430
  - Density: 2.57/km^{2} (6.65/sq mi)
- Time zone: UTC-5 (PET)
- UBIGEO: 180207

Matalaque District is one of eleven districts of the General Sánchez Cerro Province in Peru.

== Geography ==
One of the highest peaks of the district is Puka Saya at approximately 5,320 m (17,450 ft). Other mountains are listed below:

- Hatun P'ukru
- Mama Qucha
- Qullpani
- Q'illu Qaqa
- Q'uwa Laqhi
- Sunqu Qaqa
- Wanqarani
- Wilani
- Yaku Uma
- Yana Qaqa
