= Quchayuq (Bolivia) =

Mountain in Bolivia

- Location within Bolivia

Highest point
- Elevation: 3,680 m (12,070 ft)
- Coordinates: 20°41′11″S 65°49′25″W

Geography
- Location: Bolivia; Potosí Department
- Parent range: Andes

Quchayuq (Quechua qucha lake, -yuq a suffix, "the one with a lake (or lakes)", also spelled Khochayoj) is a mountain in the Andes of Bolivia which reaches a height of approximately 3,680 m (12,070 ft). It is located in the Potosí Department, Nor Chichas Province, Cotagaita Municipality. Quchayuq lies northwest of Achakanayuq.
