= Yana Qaqa (Nor Chichas) =

Mountain in the Andes of Bolivia

- Location within Bolivia

Highest point
- Elevation: 3,742 m (12,277 ft)
- Coordinates: 20°49′56″S 65°47′15″W

Geography
- Location: Bolivia; Potosí Department
- Parent range: Andes

Yana Qaqa (Quechua yana black, qaqa rock, "black rock", also spelled Yana Khakha) is a 3,742 m (12,277 ft) mountain in the Andes of Bolivia. It is located in the Potosí Department, Nor Chichas Province, Cotagaita Municipality. Yana Qaqa lies at the Caiti River.
