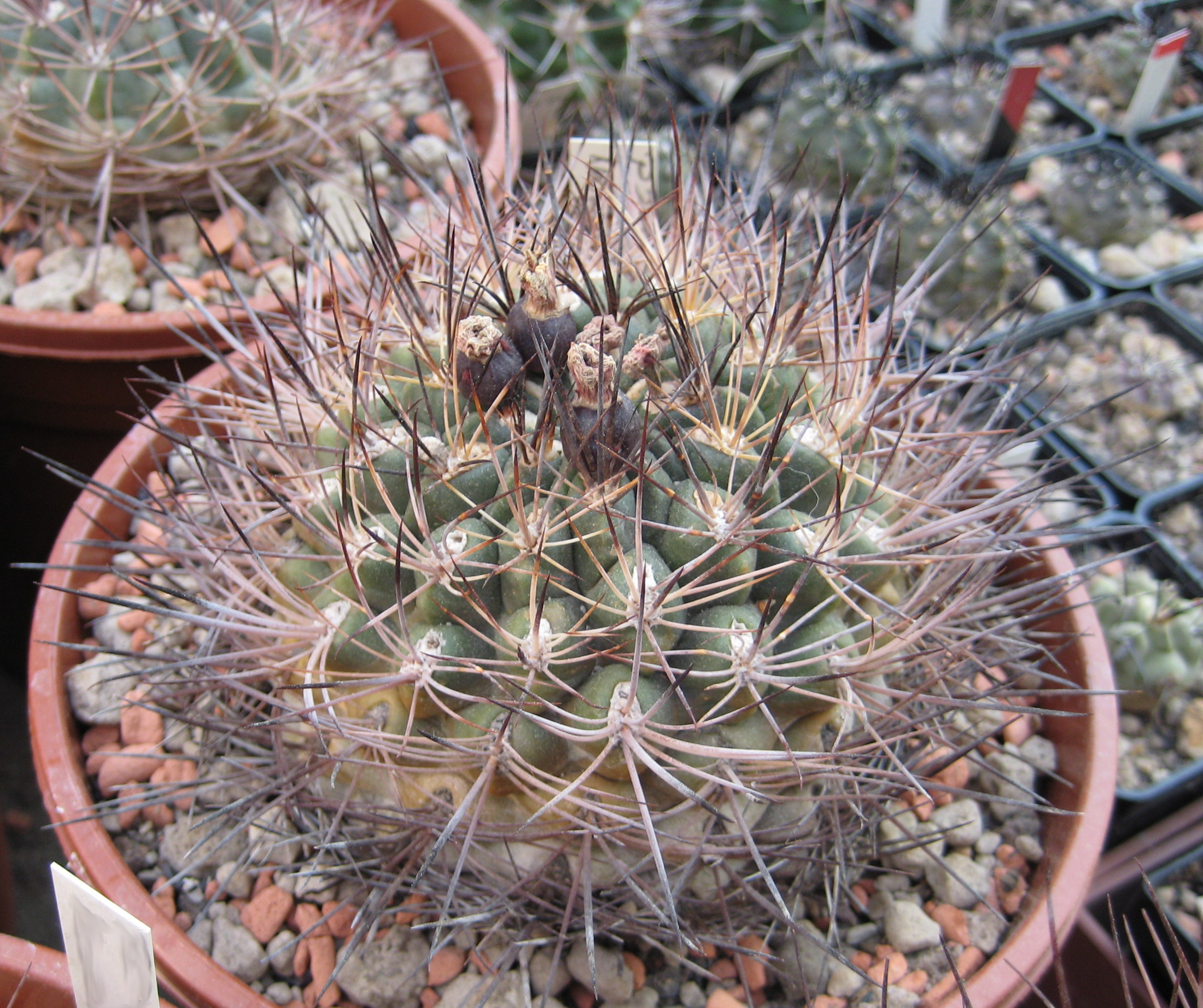
- Neowerdermannia chilensis

Scientific classification
- Kingdom: Plantae
- Clade: Tracheophytes
- Clade: Angiosperms
- Clade: Eudicots
- Order: Caryophyllales
- Family: Cactaceae
- Subfamily: Cactoideae
- Tribe: Notocacteae
- Genus: Neowerdermannia; Fric

Type species
- Neowerdermannia vorwerkii

Species
- Neowerdermannia chilensis Neowerdermannia vorwerkii

= Neowerdermannia =

Genus of cacti

Neowerdermannia is a genus of South American cacti.

== Description ==
The individual, low-growing species of the genus Neowerdermannia are spherical to pressed spherical and have a strong taproot. The approximately 16 usually spiral-shaped ribs are hardly distinguishable because they are broken up into warts. The areoles are often sunken and are located at the base of the top of the warts. Some of the thorns arising from it are curved or hooked.

The funnel-shaped flowers are white to purple-pink. They open during the day. Its flower cup and short flower tube are covered with fleshy scales and glabrous areoles.

The round, horizontally capped or side-opening fruits contain broadly egg-shaped, roughened seeds.

== Species ==
The genus comprises only two species:

Image	Scientific name	Distribution
	Neowerdermannia chilensis Backeb., 1936	Argentina, Bolivia, Chile, and Peru
	Neowerdermannia vorwerkii Frič (1930)	Bolivia and northern Argentina.
