= Tarkuni Punta =

Mountain in Bolivia

- Location within Bolivia

Highest point
- Elevation: 3,720 m (12,200 ft)
- Coordinates: 20°42′31″S 65°52′11″W

Geography
- Location: Bolivia; Potosí Department
- Parent range: Andes

Tarkuni Punta (Aymara tarku a kind of tree; a certain bone at the neck, -ni a suffix, also spelled Tarcuni Punta) is a mountain in the Andes of Bolivia which reaches a height of approximately 3,720 m (12,200 ft). It is located in the Potosí Department, Nor Chichas Province, Cotagaita Municipality.
