= Qullpani (Potosí) =

Mountain in Bolivia

- Location within Bolivia

Highest point
- Elevation: 4,168 m (13,675 ft)
- Coordinates: 20°41′28″S 65°55′40″W

Geography
- Location: Bolivia; Potosí Department
- Parent range: Andes

Qullpani (Aymara qullpa saltpeter, -ni a suffix, "the one with saltpeter", also spelled Kollpani) is a 4,168-metre-high (13,675 ft) mountain in the Andes of Bolivia. It is located in the Potosí Department, Nor Chichas Province, Cotagaita Municipality.
