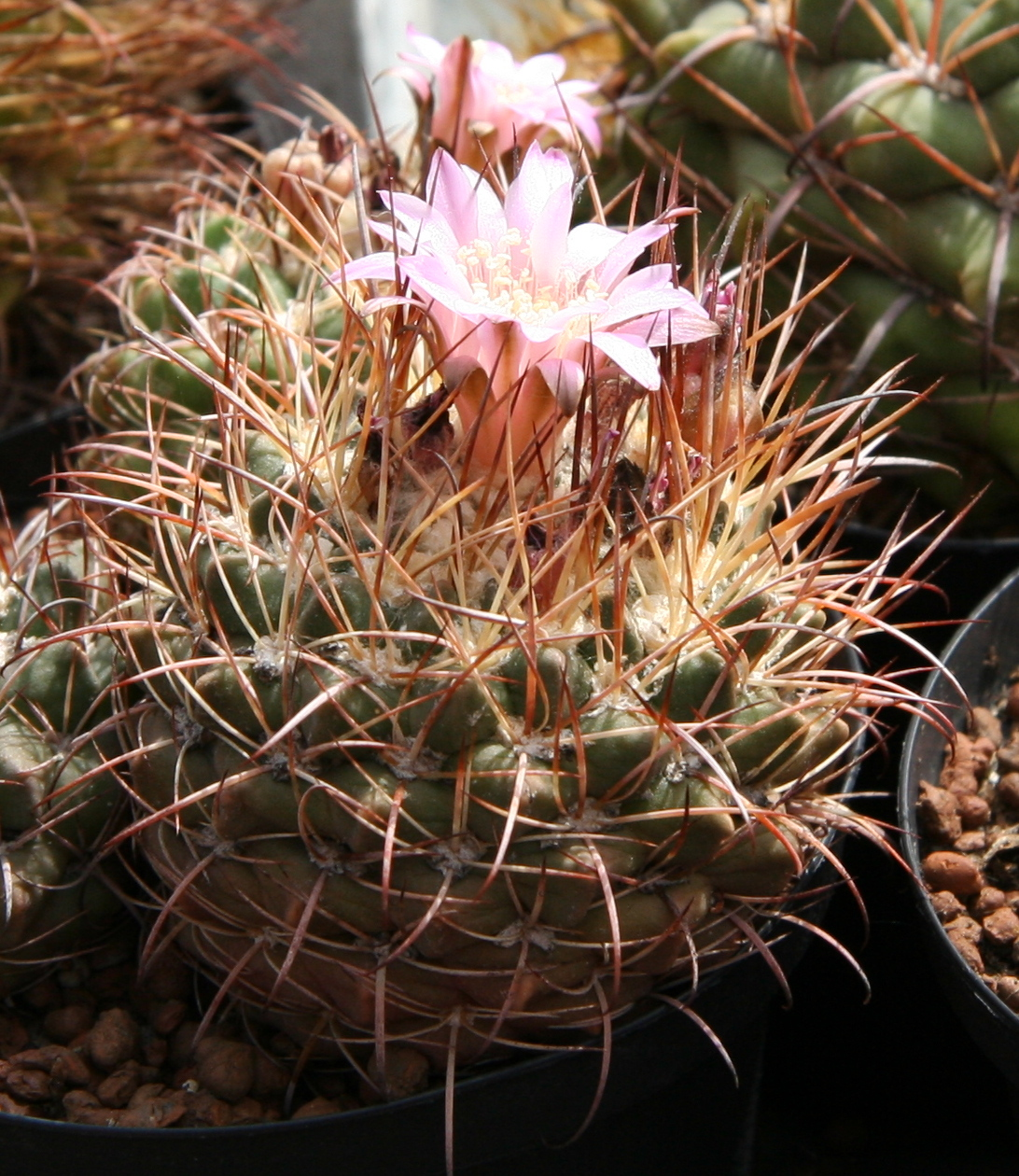

Conservation status
- Least Concern (IUCN 3.1)

Scientific classification
- Kingdom: Plantae
- Clade: Tracheophytes
- Clade: Angiosperms
- Clade: Eudicots
- Order: Caryophyllales
- Family: Cactaceae
- Subfamily: Cactoideae
- Genus: Neowerdermannia
- Species: N. vorwerkii

Binomial name
- Neowerdermannia vorwerkii Frič

= Neowerdermannia vorwerkii =

Species of cactus

Neowerdermannia vorwerkii, also known as achakana (Aymara and Quechua), is a species of cactus from high altitudes in Bolivia and northern Argentina.

== Description ==
Neowerdermannia vorwerkii grows with depressed spherical, dark grey-green shoots 6 to 10 centimeters in diameter. The 16 or more ribs are divided into conspicuous, triangular protuberances between which the areoles are sunken. The 1 to 3 brownish to greyish central spines are often hooked and up to 2 centimeters long. The up to 10 curved and brownish radial spines have a length of up to 1.7 centimeters.

The white or light to bright purple-pink flowers are 1.8 to 2 centimeters long and have the same diameter. The spherical fruits are initially green, then reddish and are up to 5 millimeters in size.

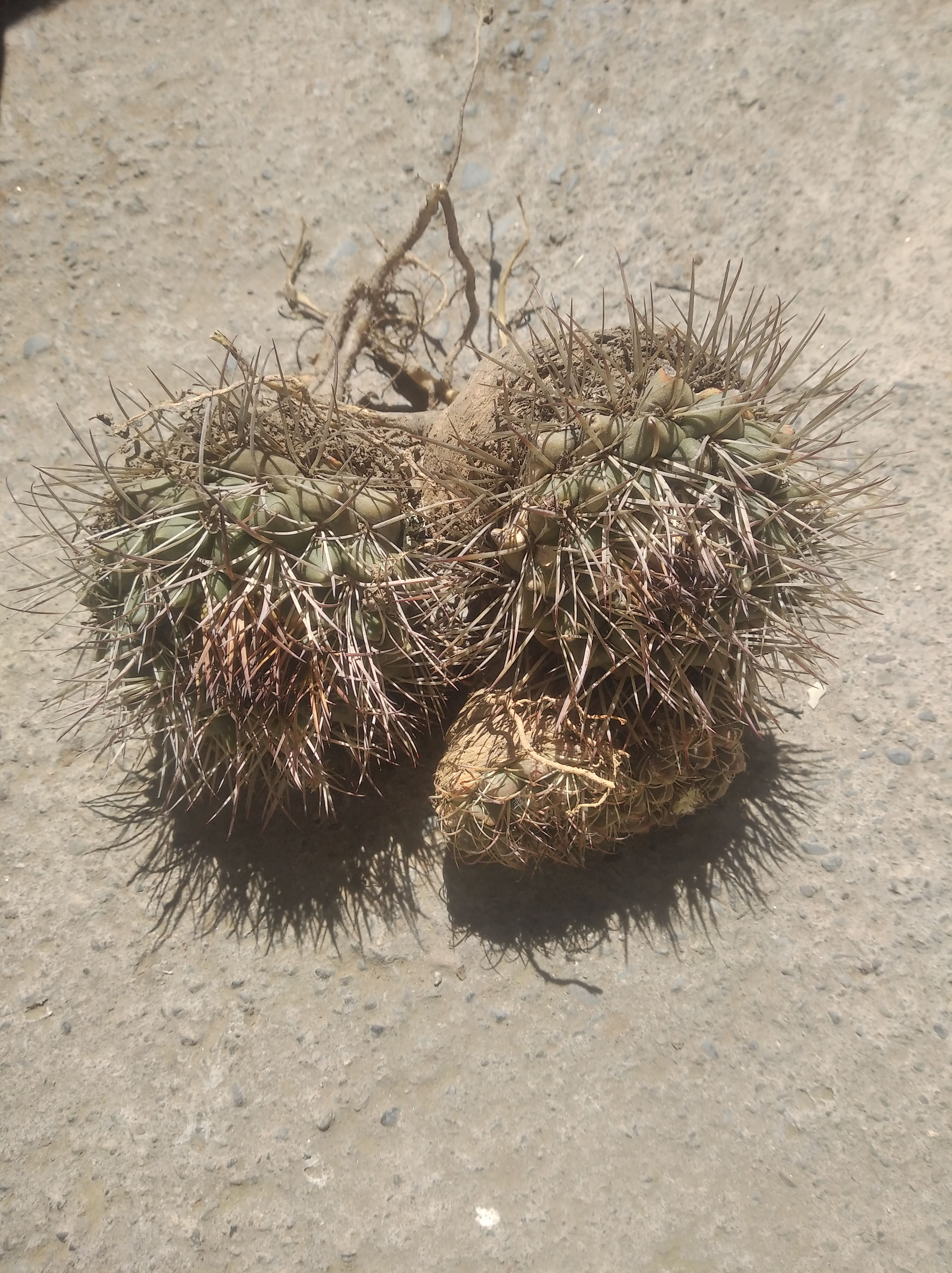
Plant

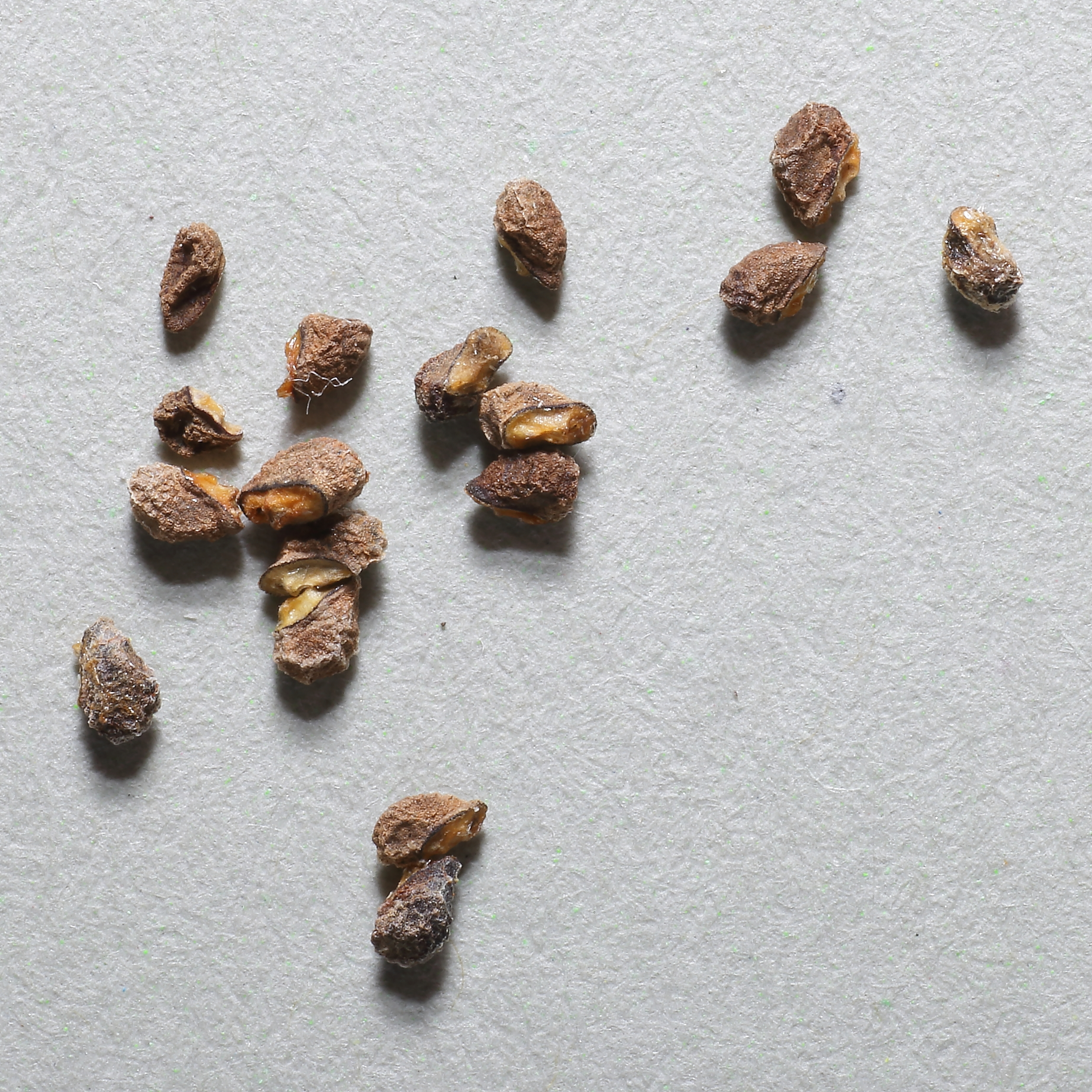
Seeds

== Distribution ==
Neowerdermannia vorwerkii is widespread in Bolivia and northern Argentina at altitudes of 3000 to 4000 meters. It grows buried in rocky soils in high mountain grasslands.

== Taxonomy ==
The first description was made in 1930 by Alberto Vojtěch Frič. Nomenclature synonyms are Gymnocalycium vorwerkii (Frič) Hutchison (1959), Weingartia vorwerkii (Frič) Backeb. (1963), Sulcorebutia vorwerkii (Backeb.) F.H.Brandt (1976) and Coryphantha vorwerkii (Frič) Halda & Malina (2005).

== Use ==
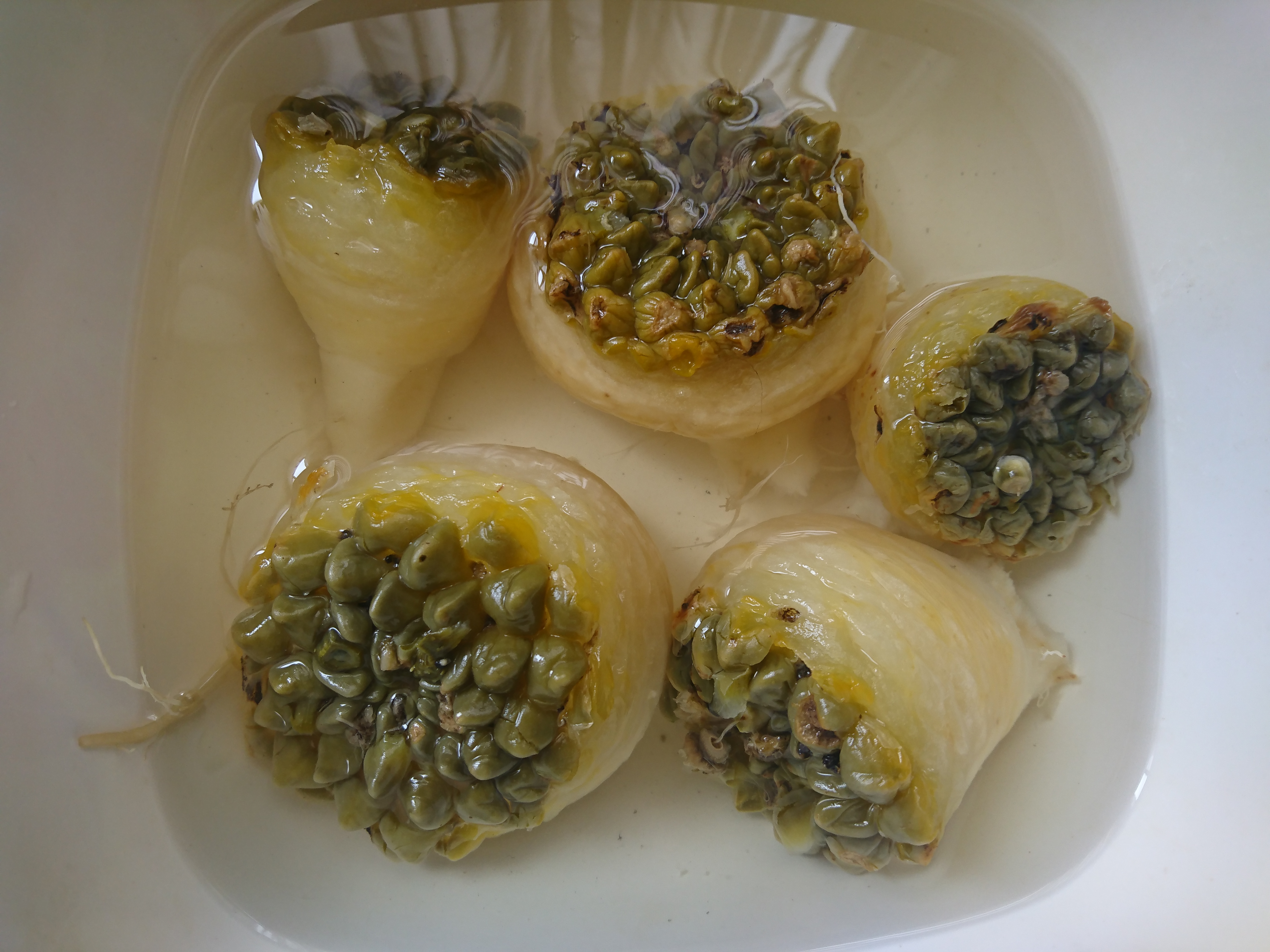
Neowerdermannia vorwerkii cooked and soaked for later preparation in gastronomy.

In the cities of Oruro and Potosí in Bolivia, this cactus known as achakana is part of the population's diet, being consumed for its medicinal properties, and also as part of the traditional dish ají de achakana, characteristic of the All Saints Festival in Bolivia. The cactus and its complete root are sold cooked and with the thorns removed for consumption in the city of Oruro.

In Jujuy, Argentina, this cactus is consumed as a potato substitute. In particular, it is used to prepare special dishes for the celebration of certain festivities.
