= Uturunqani (Ichuña) =

Mountain in Peru

- Location within Peru

Highest point
- Elevation: 4,800 m (15,700 ft)
- Coordinates: 16°18′32″S 70°28′40″W

Geography
- Location: Peru, Moquegua Region, General Sánchez Cerro Province, Ichuña District
- Parent range: Andes

Uturunqani (Aymara uturunqa, uturunqha, uturunqu, uturunqhu tiger (here referring to the jaguar), -ni a suffix to indicate ownership, "the one with the jaguar", Hispanicized spelling Otoronccani) is a mountain in the Andes of southern Peru, about 4,800 metres (15,748 ft) high. It is located in the Moquegua Region, General Sánchez Cerro Province, Ichuña District.
