= Wallqani =

Mountain in Peru

- Location within Peru

Highest point
- Elevation: 5,334 m (17,500 ft)
- Coordinates: 16°17′28″S 70°20′51″W

Geography
- Location: Peru, Moquegua Region, Puno Region
- Parent range: Andes

Wallqani (Aymara wallqa collar, -ni a suffix to indicate ownership, "the one with a collar", Hispanicized spelling Hualcani) is a 5,334-metre-high (17,500 ft) mountain in the Andes of southern Peru. It is located at the border of the Moquegua Region, General Sánchez Cerro Province, Ichuña District, and the Puno Region, Puno Province, Pichacani District. It lies northeast of Jukumarini Lake and the mountains Larama Quta and Jaqhi Jaqhini. The Larama Quta River originates south of the mountain. It flows to the south.
