= Pichacani District =

Coordinates: 16.1477°S 70.0674°W

Pichacani Pichaqani
- District
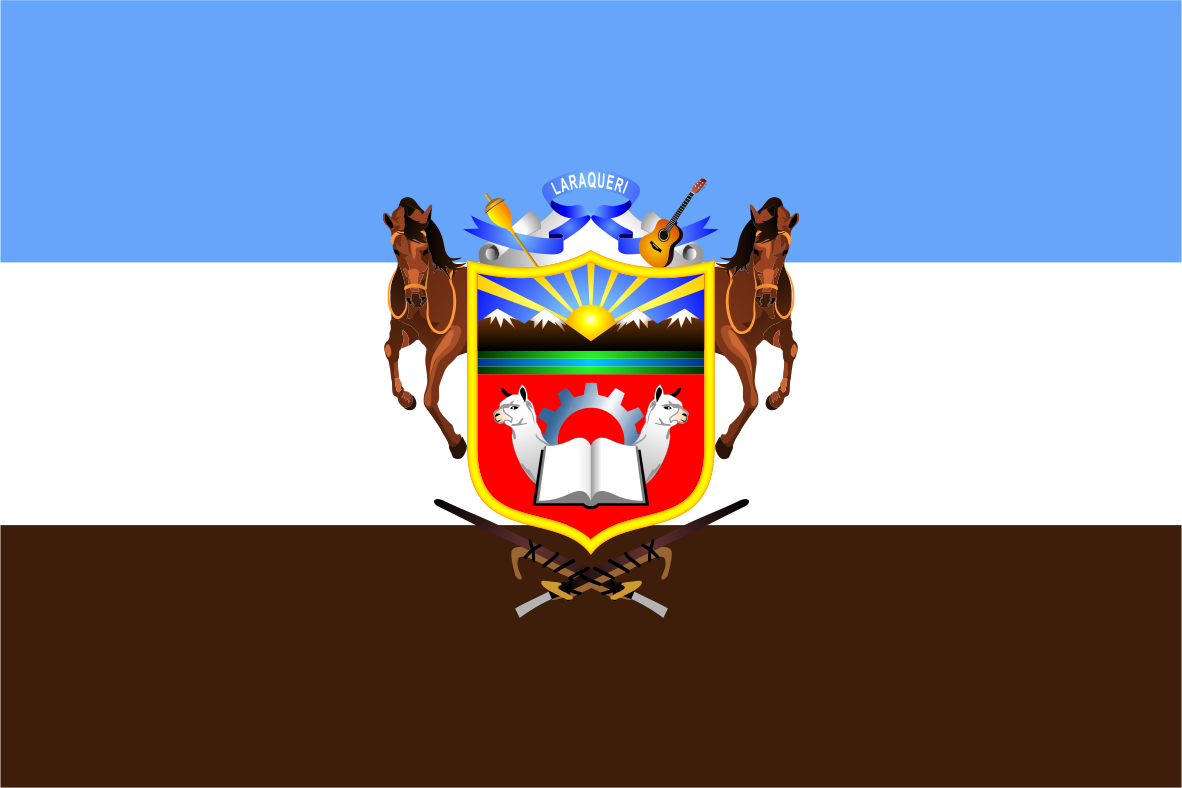
- District Flag
- Interactive map of Pichacani
- Country: Peru
- Region: Puno
- Province: Puno
- Capital: Laraqueri

Government
  - Mayor: Lucio Ccopa Mamani

Area
  - Total: 1,633.48 km^{2} (630.69 sq mi)
- Elevation: 3,975 m (13,041 ft)

Population (2005 census)
  - Total: 6,134
  - Density: 3.755/km^{2} (9.726/sq mi)
- Time zone: UTC-5 (PET)
- UBIGEO: 210111

Pichacani (hispanicized spelling) or Pichaqani (Aymara pichaqa a big needle, -ni a suffix, "the one with a big needle") is one of the fifteen districts of the Puno Province in the Puno Region in Peru.

== Geography ==
Some of the highest mountains of the district are listed below:

- Anta Qayqu
- Aqu Chaka
- Aqu K'uchu
- Chinkani
- Chuqi Tunani
- Chuqipata
- Churi Wiqu
- Ch'api Jinchu
- Ch'iyar Jaqhi
- Ch'iyar Jaqhi (Puno)
- Ch'iyar Salla
- Iru Tanka
- Jach'a Phaq'u Q'awa
- Jach'a Qullu
- Janq'u Jaqhi
- Janq'u Qalani
- Janq'u Saywani
- Janq'u Saxa
- Jayu Jayuni
- Jayuni Nasa
- Jilata
- Kuntur Ikiña
- Kunturini
- Kunturiri
- Laq'a Apachita
- Lawanani Punta
- Muru Jaqhi
- Nasa Parqu
- Ñuñu Marka
- Pichaqa
- Pilli Pillini
- Pinkilluni
- Pukara
- Pumamarka
- Phaq'u Apachita
- Phaq'u Q'awa
- Qachi Qullu
- Qala Qalani
- Quncha Marka
- Qurara Apachita
- Quta Wiqu
- Qutani
- Q'ara Qullu
- Q'illu Chuta
- Q'illu Q'atawi
- Q'iwiri
- Salla Qachi
- Surichata
- Tanka
- Tankani
- Tarujani
- Taypi Qullu
- Uma Jalsu
- Uqi
- Uyuni
- Wallata
- Wallqani
- Wantanani
- Warawarani
- Wayllani
- Wila Kunkani
- Wila Qullu
- Wila Salla

== Ethnic groups ==
The people in the district are mainly indigenous citizens of Aymara descent. Aymara is the language which the majority of the population (80.95%) learnt to speak in childhood, 17.68% of the residents started speaking using the Spanish language (2007 Peru Census).

== Climate ==
Climate data for Laraqueri, elevation 3,939 m (12,923 ft), (1991–2020)
Month	Jan	Feb	Mar	Apr	May	Jun	Jul	Aug	Sep	Oct	Nov	Dec	Year
Mean daily maximum °C (°F)	16.1 (61.0)	15.9 (60.6)	15.9 (60.6)	16.4 (61.5)	16.4 (61.5)	16.0 (60.8)	15.7 (60.3)	16.7 (62.1)	17.3 (63.1)	18.3 (64.9)	19.0 (66.2)	18.0 (64.4)	16.8 (62.3)
Mean daily minimum °C (°F)	3.4 (38.1)	3.6 (38.5)	2.5 (36.5)	−0.8 (30.6)	−5.4 (22.3)	−8.2 (17.2)	−8.5 (16.7)	−7.2 (19.0)	−3.8 (25.2)	−1.0 (30.2)	0.5 (32.9)	2.2 (36.0)	−1.9 (28.6)
Average precipitation mm (inches)	168.2 (6.62)	169.5 (6.67)	105.6 (4.16)	44.7 (1.76)	6.9 (0.27)	4.5 (0.18)	4.7 (0.19)	10.4 (0.41)	20.2 (0.80)	35.5 (1.40)	49.8 (1.96)	109.3 (4.30)	729.3 (28.72)
Source: National Meteorology and Hydrology Service of Peru

== See also ==
- Kutimpu
- Pharaquta
- Q'axilu
