= Tankani (Peru) =

Mountain in Peru

- Location within Peru

Highest point
- Elevation: 5,000 m (16,000 ft)
- Coordinates: 16°11′34″S 70°20′48″W

Geography
- Location: Peru, Puno Region
- Parent range: Andes

Tankani (Aymara tanka hat and biretta of priests, -ni a suffix to indicate ownership, "the one with a hat (or biretta)", Hispanicized spellings Tancane, Tangane) is a mountain in the Andes of southern Peru, about 5,000 metres (16,404 ft) high. It is situated in the Puno Region, Puno Province, San Antonio District, near the border with the Moquegua Region. Tankani lies northwest of the mountain Chuqipata.
