= Kunturiri (Peru) =

Mountain in Peru

- Location within Peru

Highest point
- Elevation: 5,000 m (16,000 ft)
- Coordinates: 16°05′40″S 70°14′15″W

Geography
- Location: Peru, Puno Region, Puno Province
- Parent range: Andes

Kunturiri (Aymara kunturi condor, -(i)ri a suffix, Hispanicized spelling Condorire) is a mountain in the Andes of southern Peru, about 5,000 metres (16,404 ft) high. It is situated in the Puno Region, Puno Province, Pichacani District. Kunturiri lies northeast of the mountain Wankarani and southeast of Ninachiri.
