= T'ika Wasi =

Mountain in Bolivia

- Location within Bolivia

Highest point
- Elevation: 4,105 m (13,468 ft)
- Coordinates: 20°52′52″S 65°54′05″W

Geography
- Location: Bolivia; Potosí Department
- Parent range: Andes

T'ika Wasi (Quechua t'ika flower, wasi house, "flower house", also spelled Thika Huasi) is a 4,105-metre-high (13,468 ft) mountain in the Andes of Bolivia. It is located in the Potosí Department, Nor Chichas Province, Cotagaita Municipality. T'ika Wasi lies north of the Jara Wayq'u, an affluent of the Caiti River.
