= Yaritayuq (Bolivia) =

Mountain in Bolivia

- Location within Bolivia

Highest point
- Elevation: 4,100 m (13,500 ft)
- Coordinates: 20°51′48″S 66°04′41″W

Geography
- Location: Bolivia; Potosí Department
- Parent range: Andes

Yaritayuq (yarita local name for Azorella compacta, Quechua -yuq a suffix, "the one with the yarita", also spelled Yaretayoj) is a mountain in the Andes of Bolivia which reaches a height of approximately 4,100 m (13,500 ft). It is located in the Potosí Department, Nor Chichas Province, Cotagaita Municipality. Yaritayuq lies northeast of the village of Quechisla.
