= Achakanayuq =

Mountain in Bolivia

- Location within Bolivia

Highest point
- Elevation: 3,870 m (12,700 ft)
- Coordinates: 20°42′02″S 65°47′42″W

Geography
- Location: Bolivia; Potosí Department
- Parent range: Andes

Achakanayuq (Quechua achakana (Neowerdermannia vorwerkii), a kind of cactus which an edible root, -yuq a suffix, "the one with the achakana plant", also spelled Achacanayoj) is a 3,870-metre-high (12,700 ft) mountain in the Andes of Bolivia. It is located in the Potosí Department, Nor Chichas Province, Cotagaita Municipality. Achakanayuq lies southeast of Quchayuq.
