= Uturunqani (Moquegua-Puno) =

Mountain in Peru

- Location within Peru

Highest point
- Elevation: 4,600 m (15,100 ft)
- Coordinates: 16°05′06″S 70°24′15″W

Geography
- Location: Peru, Moquegua Region, Puno Region
- Parent range: Andes

Uturunqani (Aymara uturunqa, uturunqha, uturunqu, uturunqhu tiger (here referring to the jaguar), -ni a suffix to indicate ownership, "the one with the jaguar", Hispanicized spelling Uturuncane) is a mountain in the Andes of southern Peru, about 4,600 metres (15,092 ft) high. It is located in the Moquegua Region, General Sánchez Cerro Province, Ichuña District, and the Puno Region, Puno Province, Tiquillaca District. It lies southeast of the mountain Suma Laq'a.

Uturunqani is also the name of the river which flows along its eastern and southern slopes. Its waters flow to Ichuña southwest of the mountain.
