= Qullpani (Peru) =

Mountain in Peru

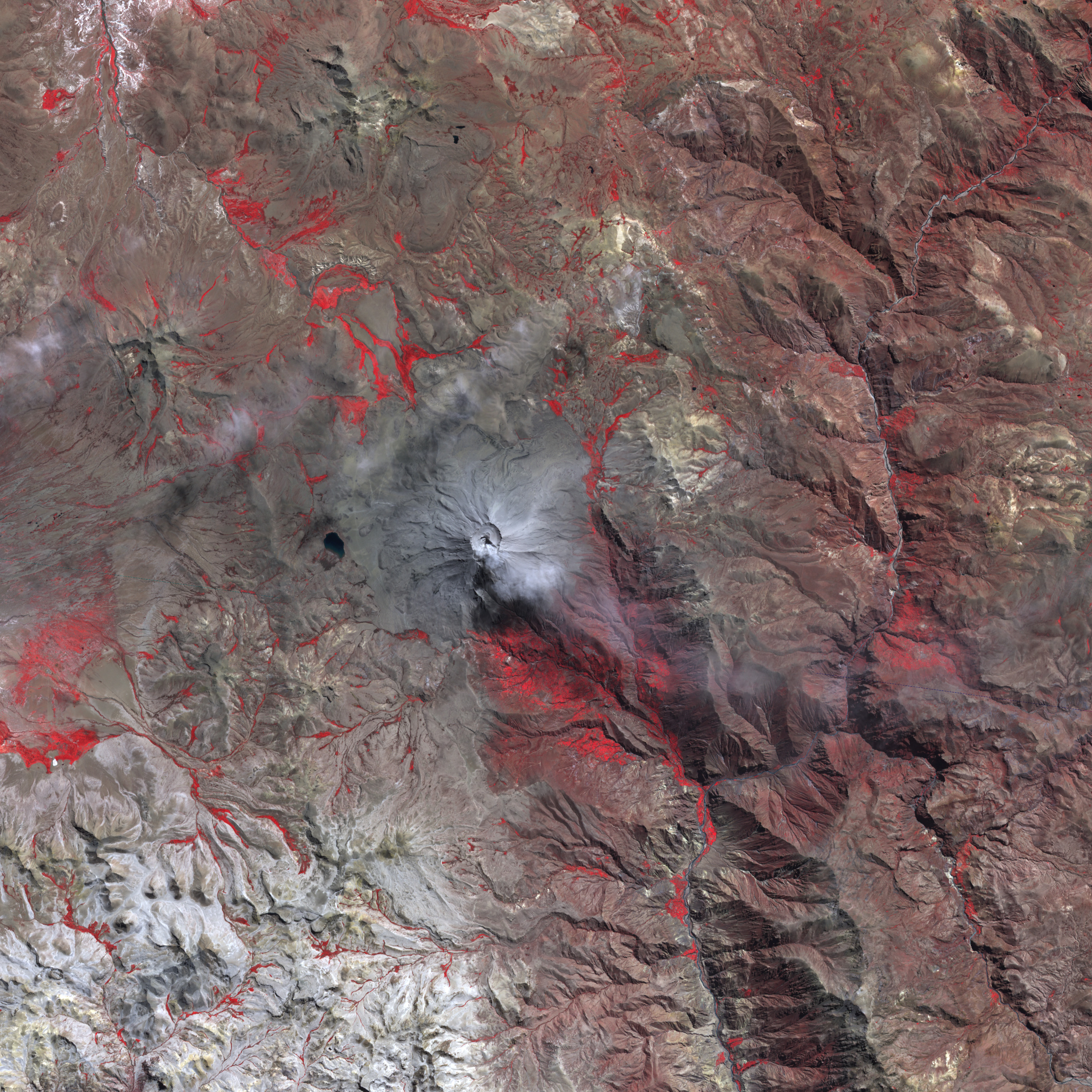
- The Ubinas volcano and Qullpani southwest of it as seen from above (NASA, 2006)

Highest point
- Elevation: 4,800 m (15,700 ft)
- Coordinates: 16°24′27″S 70°58′03″W

Geography
- Location within Peru
- Location: Peru, Arequipa Region, Moquegua Region
- Parent range: Andes

Qullpani (Aymara qullpa saltpeter, -ni a suffix, "the one with saltpeter", also spelled Cullpane) is a mountain in the Andes of Peru which reaches a height of approximately 4,800 m (15,700 ft). It is located in the Arequipa Region, Arequipa Province, Tarucani District, and in the Moquegua Region, General Sánchez Cerro Province, Matalaque District. Qullpani lies southwest of the Ubinas volcano.
