= Iskay Rumi =

Mountain in Bolivia

- Location within Bolivia

Highest point
- Elevation: 4,782 m (15,689 ft)
- Coordinates: 20°54′36″S 66°03′54″W

Geography
- Location: Bolivia; Potosí Department
- Parent range: Andes

Iskay Rumi (Quechua iskay two, rumi stone, "two stones", also spelled Iskhay Rumi) is a 4,782-metre-high (15,689 ft) mountain in the Andes of Bolivia. It is located in the Potosí Department, Nor Chichas Province, Cotagaita Municipality. Iskay Rumi lies northwest of the mining town of Santa Bárbara.
