= Qayqu (Moquegua) =

Mountain in Peru

- Location within Peru

Highest point
- Elevation: 5,223 m (17,136 ft)
- Coordinates: 16°15′33″S 70°21′22″W

Geography
- Location: Peru, Moquegua Region
- Parent range: Andes

Qayqu (Quechua for a type of hunt, also spelled Ccaycco, Ocaycco) is a 5,223-metre-high (17,136 ft) mountain in the Andes of southern Peru. It is located in the Moquegua Region, General Sánchez Cerro Province, Ichuña District. It lies northwest of Ch'iyar Jaqhi.
