= Lake Paracota (Puno) =

Lake in Puno, Peru

- Location within Peru
- Location: Peru; Puno Region
- Coordinates: 16°25′0.7″S 70°17′02″W
- Surface elevation: 4,512 m (14,803 ft)

Lake Paracota (possibly from Aymara phara dry, quta lake) is a lake in Peru located in the Puno Region, Puno Province, Pichacani District. It is situated at a height of about 4,512 metres (14,803 ft). Lake Paracota lies southeast of the larger Lake Jucumarini.
