= Millu (Moquegua-Puno) =

Mountain in Peru

- Location within Peru

Highest point
- Elevation: 5,225 m (17,142 ft)
- Coordinates: 16°12′33″S 70°21′29″W

Geography
- Location: Peru, Moquegua Region, Puno Region
- Parent range: Andes

Millu (Aymara for a kind of salpeter, Quechua for salty, Hispanicized spelling Millo) is a mountain in the Andes of southern Peru, about 5,225 metres (17,142 ft) high. It is located on the border of the Moquegua Region, General Sánchez Cerro Province, Ichuña District, and the Puno Region, Puno Province, San Antonio District. It lies southwest of the mountain Chuqipata.
