= Chuqipata =

Mountain in Peru

- Location within Peru

Highest point
- Elevation: 5,050 m (16,570 ft)
- Coordinates: 16°12′10″S 70°19′54″W

Geography
- Location: Peru, Moquegua Region, Puno Region
- Parent range: Andes

Chuqipata (Aymara chuqi gold, pata step, "gold step", Hispanicized spelling Choquepata) is a mountain in the Andes of southern Peru, about 5,050 metres (16,568 ft) high. It is situated on the border of the Moquegua Region, General Sánchez Cerro Province, Ichuña District, and the Puno Region, Puno Province, in the districts Pichacani and San Antonio. It lies northwest of the mountain Churi Wiqu, northeast of Millu and southeast of Tankani.
