= Larama Quta =

Mountain in Peru

- Location within Peru

Highest point
- Elevation: 5,098 m (16,726 ft)
- Coordinates: 16°19′37″S 70°21′46″W

Geography
- Location: Peru, Moquegua Region
- Parent range: Andes

Larama Quta (Aymara larama blue, quta lake, "blue lake", Hispanicized spelling Laramacota) is a 5,098-metre-high (16,726 ft) mountain in the Andes of southern Peru. It is situated in the Moquegua Region, General Sánchez Cerro Province, Ichuña District, northeast of Jukumarini Lake. Larama Quta lies at a river of the same name which originates northeast of the mountain. It flows to the south.
