= Wankarani (Puno) =

Mountain in Peru

- Location within Peru

Highest point
- Elevation: 5,181 m (16,998 ft)
- Coordinates: 16°06′30″S 70°15′24″W

Geography
- Location: Peru, Puno Region, Puno Province
- Parent range: Andes

Wankarani (Aymara wankanra a kind of drum, -ni a suffix to indicate ownership, "the one with a wankara", Hispanicized spelling Huancarani) is a 5,181-metre-high (16,998 ft) mountain in the Andes of southern Peru. It is situated in the Puno Region, Puno Province, on the border of the districts Pichacani and San Antonio.

Wankarani (Huancarani) is also the name of a river which originates north of the mountain. Along the village of Wankarani (Huancarane) it flows to the north as a tributary of the Uturunqani River.
