= Lake Jucumarini =

Lake in Peru

- Location within Peru
- Location: Moquegua Region
- Coordinates: 16°23′10.5″S 70°24′12.5″W
- Basin countries: Peru
- Surface elevation: 4,390 m (14,400 ft)

Lake Jucumarini, Lake Jacumarini or Lake Ucumarini (possibly from Aymara jukumari bear) is a lake in Peru at 4390 m of elevation. It is located in the Moquegua Region, General Sánchez Cerro Province, Ichuña District.

== See also ==
- Pharaquta
- List of lakes in Peru
