= Huaynaputina =

Volcano in southern Peru

- Location within Peru

Highest point
- Elevation: ≈4,850 m (15,910 ft)
- Listing: List of volcanoes in Peru
- Coordinates: 16°36′56″S 70°50′59″W

Naming
- Language of name: Quechua

Geography
- Location: Peru
- Parent range: Andes

Geology
- Mountain type: Stratovolcano
- Volcanic zone: Central Volcanic Zone
- Last eruption: February to March 1600

Huaynaputina (/ˌwaɪnəpʊˈtiːnə/ WY-nə-puu-TEE-nə; Spanish: [wajnapuˈtina]) is a volcano in a volcanic high plateau in southern Peru. Lying in the Central Volcanic Zone of the Andes, it was formed by the subduction of the oceanic Nazca Plate under the continental South American Plate. Huaynaputina is a large volcanic crater, which lacks an identifiable mountain profile, with an outer stratovolcano and three younger volcanic vents within an amphitheatre-shaped structure that is either a former caldera or a remnant of glacial erosion. The volcano has erupted dacitic magma.

Huaynaputina has erupted several times during the Holocene, (Note: The current geologic epoch, which began 11,700 years ago.) including on 19 February 1600 – the largest recorded eruption ever witnessed in South America – which continued with a series of events into March. Witnessed by people in the city of Arequipa, it killed perhaps 1,000–1,500 people in the region, wiped out vegetation, buried the surrounding area with 2 metres (7 ft) of volcanic rock, and damaged infrastructure and economic resources. The eruption had a significant impact on Earth's climate, causing a volcanic winter: temperatures in the Northern Hemisphere decreased; cold waves hit parts of Europe, Asia, and the Americas; and the climate disruption may have played a role in the onset of the Little Ice Age. Floods, famines, and social upheavals resulted, including a probable link with the Russian famine of 1601–1603 and Time of Troubles. This eruption has been computed to measure 6 on the Volcanic Explosivity Index (VEI).

The volcano has not erupted since 1600. There are fumaroles (Note: Vents which release volcanic gases.) in the amphitheatre-shaped structure, and hot springs occur in the region, some of which have been associated with Huaynaputina. The volcano lies in a remote region where there is little human activity, but about 30,000 people live in the immediately surrounding area, and another one million in the Arequipa metropolitan area. If an eruption similar to the 1600 event were to occur, it would quite likely lead to a high death toll and cause substantial socioeconomic disruption. The Peruvian Geophysical Institute announced in 2017 that Huaynaputina would be monitored by the Southern Volcanological Observatory, and seismic observation began in 2019.

== Name ==
The name Huaynaputina, also spelled Huayna Putina, was given to the volcano after the 1600 eruption. According to one translation cited by the Peruvian Ministry of Foreign Trade and Tourism, Huayna means 'new', and Putina means 'fire-throwing mountain'; the full name is meant to suggest the aggressiveness of its volcanic activity and refers to the 1600 eruption being its first one. Two other translations are 'young boiling one' – perhaps a reference to earlier eruptions – or 'where young were boiled', which may refer to human sacrifices. Other names for the volcano include Chequepuquina, (Note: "Volcano of the bad omen") Chiquimote, Guayta, Omate and Quinistaquillas. El Misti, another volcano, was sometimes mistakenly referred to as Huaynaputina due to confusion between the two volcanoes.

== Geography ==
The volcano is part of the Central Volcanic Zone of the Andes. Other volcanoes in this zone from northwest to southeast include Sara Sara, Solimana, Coropuna, Andagua volcanic field, Huambo volcanic field, Sabancaya, Chachani, El Misti, Ubinas, Ticsani, Tutupaca, Yucamane, Purupuruni and Casiri. Ubinas is currently the most active volcano in Peru; Huaynaputina, El Misti, Sabancaya, Ticsani, Tutupaca, Ubinas and Yucamane have been active in historical time, while Sara Sara, Coropuna, Ampato, Casiri and Chachani are considered to be dormant. Most volcanoes of the Central Volcanic Zone are large composite volcanoes that can remain active for several million years, but there are also conical stratovolcanoes with shorter lifespans. In the Central Volcanic Zone, large explosive eruptions with Volcanic Explosivity Index of 6 and higher occur on average every 2,000 to 4,000 years.

Huaynaputina is in the Omate and Quinistaquillas Districts, which are part of the General Sánchez Cerro Province in the Moquegua Region of southern Peru. The town of Omate lies 16 kilometres (10 mi) southwest of Huaynaputina. The city of Moquegua is 65 kilometres (40 mi) south-southwest of the volcano and Arequipa is 80 km (50 mi) to its north-northwest.

The region is generally remote and the terrain extreme. The area around Huaynaputina is not easily accessible and human activity is low. Within 16 kilometres (9.9 mi) of Huaynaputina there are a number of small farms. A cattle-grazing footpath leads from Quinistaquillas to the volcano, and it is possible to approach the volcano over surrounding ash plains. The landscapes around the volcano have unique characteristics that make them an important geological heritage.

=== Structure ===
Huaynaputina lies at an elevation of about 4,850 m (15,910 ft). It consists of an outer composite volcano, or stratovolcano, and three younger volcanic vents nested within an amphitheatre that is 2.5 km (1.6 mi) wide and 400 m (1,300 ft) deep. This horseshoe-shaped structure opens eastwards and is set in the older volcano at an elevation of 4,400 m (14,400 ft). The amphitheatre lies at the margin of a rectangular high plateau that is covered by about 2 m (6.6 ft) thick ash, extending over an area of 50 km^{2} (19 sq mi). The volcano has generally modest dimensions and rises less than 600 m (2,000 ft) above the surrounding terrain, but the products of the volcano's 1600 eruption cover much of the region especially west, north and south from the amphitheatre. These include pyroclastic flow dunes that crop out from underneath the tephra. (Note: Fragmented volcanic rocks erupted by the vent.) Deposits from the 1600 eruption and previous events also crop out within the amphitheatre walls. Another southeastward-opening landslide scar lies just north of Huaynaputina.

One of these funnel-shaped vents is a 70 m (230 ft) trough that cuts into the amphitheatre. The trough appears to be a remnant of a fissure vent. A second vent appears to have been about 400 m (1,300 ft) wide before the development of a third vent, which has mostly obscured the first two. The third vent is steep-walled, with a depth of 80 m (260 ft); it contains a pit that is 200 m (660 ft) wide, set within a small mound that is in part nested within the second vent. This third vent is surrounded by concentric faults. At least one of the vents has been described as an ash cone. A fourth vent lies on the southern slope of the composite volcano outside of the amphitheatre and has been described as a maar. (Note: A maar is an explosion crater formed through the interaction of magma and groundwater.) It is about 70 m (230 ft) wide and 30 m (98 ft) deep and appears to have formed during a phreatomagmatic (Note: A volcanic process triggered by the interaction of magma and water.) eruption. These vents lie at an elevation of about 4,200 m (13,800 ft), making them among the highest vents of a Plinian eruption (Note: An intense volcanic eruption that ejects material as a high column of ash and pumice.) in the world.

Slumps have buried parts of the amphitheatre. Dacitic dykes (Note: A sheet-shaped intrusion of magma into already existing rock.) crop out within the amphitheatre and are aligned along a northwest–south trending lineament that the younger vents are also located on. These dykes and a dacitic lava dome of similar composition were formed before the 1600 eruption. Faults with recognizable scarps occur within the amphitheatre and have offset the younger vents; some of these faults existed before the 1600 eruption while others were activated during the event.

=== Surroundings ===
The terrain west of the volcano is a high plateau at an elevation of about 4,600 m (15,100 ft); north of Huaynaputina the volcano Ubinas and the depression of Laguna Salinas lie on the plateau, while the peaks Cerro El Volcán and Cerro Chen are situated south of it. The lava dome Cerro El Volcán and another small lava dome, Cerro Las Chilcas, lie 3 km (1.9 mi) south from Huaynaputina. Northeast-east of Huaynaputina, the terrain drops off steeply (2.3 km or 1.4 mi vertically and 6 km or 3.7 mi horizontally) into the Río Tambo valley, which rounds Huaynaputina east and south of the volcano. Some tributary valleys join the Río Tambo from Huaynaputina; clockwise from the east these are the Quebradas Huaynaputina, Quebrada Tortoral, Quebrada Aguas Blancas and Quebrada del Volcán. The Río Tambo eventually flows southwestward into the Pacific Ocean.

== Geology ==
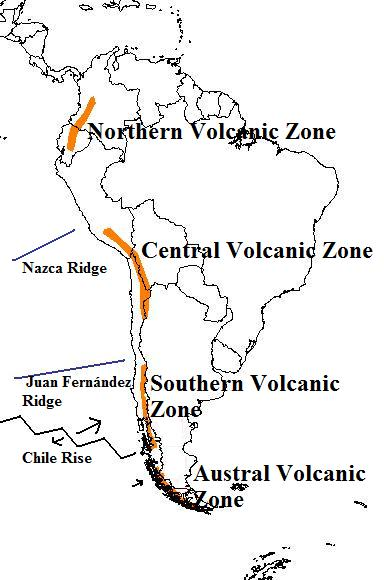
The volcanic zones of the Andes

The oceanic Nazca tectonic plate is subducting at a rate of 10.3 cm/year (4.1 in/year) beneath the continental part of the South American tectonic plate; this process is responsible for volcanic activity and the uplift of the Andes mountains and of the Altiplano plateau. The subduction is oblique, leading to strike-slip faulting. (Note: A strike-slip fault features two plates moving past each other horizontally.) Volcanic activity does not occur along the entire length of the Andes; where subduction is shallow, there are gaps with little volcanic activity. Between these gaps lie volcanic belts: the Northern Volcanic Zone, the Central Volcanic Zone, the Southern Volcanic Zone and the Austral Volcanic Zone.

There are about 400 Pliocene–Quaternary volcanoes in Peru, with Quaternary activity occurring only in the southern part of the country. Peruvian volcanoes are part of the Central Volcanic Zone. Volcanic activity in that zone has moved eastward since the Jurassic. Remnants of the older volcanism persist in the coastal Cordillera de la Costa but the present-day volcanic arc lies in the Andes, where it is defined by stratovolcanoes. Many Peruvian volcanoes are poorly studied because they are remote and difficult to access.

The basement underneath Huaynaputina is formed by almost 2-kilometre-thick (1.2 mi) sediments and volcanic intrusions of Paleozoic to Mesozoic age including the Yura Group, as well as the Cretaceous Matalaque Formation of volcanic origin – these are all units of rock that existed before the formation of Huaynaputina. During the Tertiary, these were overlaid by a total of 300–500-metre-thick (980–1,640 ft) deposits from the ignimbritic (Note: Ignimbrites are fluids consisting of gas and fragmented rocks that are expelled from volcanoes and form ignimbritic rocks when they solidify.) Capillune, Llallahui and Sencca Formations – all older rock units. Cretaceous sediments and Paleogene–Neogene volcanic rocks form the high plateau around Huaynaputina. The emplacement of the Capillune Formation continued into the earliest Pliocene; subsequently the Plio-Pleistocene Barroso Group was deposited. It includes the composite volcano that hosts Huaynaputina as well as ignimbrites that appear to come from calderas. One such caldera is located just south of Huaynaputina. The late Pleistocene to Holocene volcanoes have been classified as the Arequipa Volcanics.

=== Local ===
The vents of Huaynaputina trend from the north-northwest to the south-southeast, and this trend encompasses the neighbouring volcanoes Ubinas and Ticsani. Ubinas is a typical stratovolcano while Ticsani has a similar structure to Huaynaputina. These volcanoes constitute a volcanic field located behind the major volcanic arc, associated with faults at the margin of the Río Tambo graben (Note: A graben is a rectangular depression, which forms when the crust spreads and a block of it sags.) and regional strike-slip faults. The faults associated with the volcanic complex have influenced the evolution of the constituent volcanoes including Huaynaputina by acting as conduits for ascending magma especially at fault intersections. The volcanic rocks produced by these volcanoes have similar compositions, and historical seismic and volcanic activity at Ubinas and Ticsani indicate that they share a magma reservoir. A 40 km × 60 km (25 mi × 37 mi) magma reservoir may underpin this volcanic system.

=== Composition ===
The eruption products of the 1600 eruption are dacites, which define a calc-alkaline, potassium-rich suite sometimes described as adakitic. The 1600 rocks also contain rhyolite inclusions and a rhyolite matrix. Andesite has also been found at Huaynaputina. Phenocrysts include biotite, chalcopyrite, hornblende, ilmenite, magnetite and plagioclase; amphibole, apatite and pyroxene have been reported as well. Aside from newly formed volcanic rocks, Huaynaputina in 1600 also erupted material that is derived from rocks underlying the volcano, including sediments and older volcanic rocks, both of which were hydrothermally altered. Pumices from Huaynaputina are white.

The amount of volatiles (Note: Volatiles are compounds such as water and carbon dioxide that are gaseous at magmatic temperatures but are mixed in the magma.) in the magma appears to have decreased during the 1600 eruption, indicating that it originated either in two separate magma chambers or from one zoned chamber. This may explain changes in the eruption phenomena during the 1600 activity as the "Dacite 1" rocks erupted early during the 1600 event were more buoyant and contained more gas and thus drove a Plinian eruption, while the latter "Dacite 2" rocks were more viscous and only generated Vulcanian eruptions. (Note: Vulcanian eruptions have bursts of explosions, while Plinian eruptions are ongoing stable explosive eruptions.) Interactions with the crust and crystal fractionation (Note: changes in magma composition caused by crystals settling out under their weight.) processes were involved in the genesis of the magmas as well, with the so-called "Dacite 1" geochemical suite forming deep in the crust, while the "Dacite 2" geochemical suite appears to have interacted with the upper crust.

The rocks had a temperature of about 780–815 °C (1,436–1,499 °F) when they were erupted, with the "Dacite 1" being hotter than the "Dacite 2". Their formation may have been stimulated by the entry of mafic (Note: A volcanic rock relatively rich in iron and magnesium, relative to silicium.) magmas into the magmatic system; such an entry of new magma in a volcanic system is often the trigger for explosive eruptions. The magmas erupted early during the 1600 event (in the first stage of the eruption) appear to have originated from depths of more than 20 km (12 mi); petrological analysis indicates that some magmas came from depths greater than 15–25 km (9–16 mi) and others from about 4–6 km (2.5–3.7 mi). An older hypothesis by de Silva and Francis held that the entry of water into the magmatic system may have triggered the eruption. A 2006 study argues that the entry of new dacitic magma into an already existing dacitic magma system triggered the 1600 eruption; furthermore movement of deep andesitic magmas that had generated the new dacite produced movements within the volcano.

== Eruption history ==
The ancestral composite volcano that holds Huaynaputina is part of the Pastillo volcanic complex, which developed in the form of 500 m (1,600 ft) thick andesitic rocks after the Miocene, and appears to be of Miocene to Pleistocene age. It underwent sector collapses and glacial erosion, which altered its appearance and its flanks. The amphitheatre which contains the Huaynaputina vents formed probably not as a caldera but either a glacial cirque, a sector collapse scar or another kind of structure that was altered by fluvial and glacial erosion. Other extinct volcanoes in the area have similar amphitheatre structures. It is likely that the development of the later Huaynaputina volcano within the composite volcano is coincidental, although a similar tectonic stress field controlled the younger vents.

Recently emplaced, postglacial dacite bodies occur in the Huaynaputina area, some of which probably formed shortly before the 1600 eruption. Cerro Las Chilcas also predates the 1600 eruption and appears to be the earliest volcanic centre in the area. The Cerro El Volcán dome formed during the Quaternary and may be the remnant of a cluster of lava domes south of Huaynaputina.

=== Holocene ===
Tephra and block-and-ash flow deposits from Holocene eruptions can be found within the amphitheatre. Some tephra layers that are 7,000 to 1,000 years old and close to Ubinas volcano have been attributed to activity at Huaynaputina. Three eruptions of the volcano have been dated to 9,700 ± 190, less than 7,480 ± 40 years ago and 5,750 years Before Present, respectively. The first two eruptions produced pumice falls and pyroclastic flows. The first of these, a Plinian eruption, also deposited tephra in Laguna Salinas, north of Huaynaputina, and produced a block-and-ash flow to its south. A debris avalanche deposit crops out on the eastern side of the Río Tambo, opposite to the amphitheatre; it may have been formed not long before the 1600 eruption.

The existence of a volcano at Huaynaputina was not recognized before the 1600 eruption, with no known previous eruptions other than fumarolic activity. As a result, the 1600 eruption has been referred to as an instance of monogenetic volcanism. The pre-1600 topography of the volcano was described as "a low ridge in the center of a Sierra", and it is possible that a cluster of lava domes existed at the summit before the 1600 eruption which was blown away during the event.

The last eruption before 1600 may have preceded that year by several centuries, based on the presence of volcanic eruption products buried under soil. Native people reportedly offered sacrifices and offerings to the mountain such as birds, personal clothing and sheep, although it is known that non-volcanic mountains in southern Peru received offerings as well. There have been no eruptions since 1600; a report of an eruption in 1667 is unsubstantiated and unclear owing to the sparse historical information. It probably reflects an eruption at Ubinas instead.

=== Fumaroles and hot springs ===
Fumaroles occur in the amphitheatre close to the three vents, on the third vent, and in association with dykes that crop out in the amphitheatre. In 1962, there were reportedly no fumaroles within the amphitheatre. These fumaroles produce white fumes and smell of rotten eggs. The fumarolic gas composition is dominated by water vapour, with smaller quantities of carbon dioxide and sulfur gases. Investigations in 2010 recorded temperatures of 51.8–78.7 °C (125.2–173.7 °F) for the gases, with seasonal variations. Vegetation has grown at their vents.

Hot springs occur in the region and some of these have been associated with Huaynaputina; these include Candagua and Palcamayo northeast, Agua Blanca and Cerro Reventado southeast from the volcano on the Río Tambo and Ullucan almost due west. The springs have temperatures ranging from 22.8–75.4 °C (73.0–167.7 °F) and contain large amounts of dissolved salts. Cerro Reventado and Ullucan appear to be fed from magmatic water and a deep reservoir, while Agua Blanca is influenced by surface waters.

== 1600 eruption ==
1600 eruption of Huaynaputina
- Start date: 19 February 1600
- End date: 6 March 1600
- Type: Plinian, Vulcanian
- VEI: 6

Based on historical records, Huaynaputina's eruption commenced on 19 February 1600 (following earthquakes that began four days prior), with the earliest signs of the impending eruption perhaps in December 1599. The duration of the eruption is not well constrained but may have lasted up to 12–19 hours. The event continued with earthquakes and ash fall for about two weeks and ended on 6 March; the air was clear of ash from the eruption on 2 April 1600. Some reports of late ash falls may be due to wind-transported ash, and there are no deposits from a supposed eruption in August 1600; such reports may refer to mudflows or explosions in pyroclastic flows.

The eruption of 1600 was initially attributed to Ubinas volcano and sometimes to El Misti. Priests observed and recorded the eruption from Arequipa, and the friar Antonio Vázquez de Espinosa wrote a second-hand account of the eruption based on a witness's report from the city. The scale of the eruption and its impact on climate have been determined from historical records, tree ring data, the position of glaciers, the thickness of speleothems (Note: chemically formed deposits in caves.) and ice, plant flowering times, wine harvests and coral growth. Stratigraphically, the eruption deposits have been subdivided into five formations.

=== Prelude and sequence of events ===
The eruption may have been triggered when new, "Dacite 1" magma entered into a magmatic system containing "Dacite 2" magma and pressurized the system, causing magma to begin ascending to the surface. In the prelude to the eruption, magma moving upwards to the future vents caused earthquakes beginning at a shallow reservoir at a depth of 6 km (3.7 mi); according to the accounts of priests, people in Arequipa fled their houses out of fear that they would collapse. The rising magma appears to have intercepted an older hydrothermal system that existed as much as 3 km (1.9 mi) below the vents; parts of the system were expelled during the eruption. Once the magma reached the surface, the eruption quickly became intense.

A first Plinian stage took place on 19 and 20 February, accompanied by an increase of earthquake activity. The first Plinian event lasted for about 20 hours and formed pumice deposits close to the vent that were 18–23 m (59–75 ft) thick. The pumice was buried by the ash erupted during this stage, which has been recorded as far as Antarctica. This stage of the eruption produced at least 26 km^{3} (6.2 cu mi) of rocks, comprising the bulk of the output from the 1600 eruption. A sustained eruption column about 34–46 km (21–29 mi) high likely created a mushroom cloud that darkened the sky, obscuring the sun and the stars. Afterwards, collapses in the amphitheatre and within the vent enlarged both features; they also decreased the intensity of the eruption. A first pyroclastic flow was deposited already during this time when the column became unstable.

The Plinian stage was channelled by a fracture and had the characteristics of a fissure-fed eruption. Possibly, the second vent formed during this stage, but another interpretation is that the second vent is actually a collapse structure that formed late during the eruption. Much of the excavation of the conduit took place during this stage.

After a hiatus the volcano began erupting pyroclastic flows; these were mostly constrained by the topography and were erupted in stages, intercalated by ash fall that extended to larger distances. Most of these pyroclastic flows accumulated in valleys radiating away from Huaynaputina, reaching distances of 13 km (8 mi) from the vents. Winds blew ash from the pyroclastic flows, and rain eroded freshly deposited pyroclastic deposits. Ash fall and pyroclastic flows alternated during this stage, probably caused by brief obstructions of the vent; at this time a lava dome formed within the second vent. A change in the composition of the erupted rocks occurred, the "Dacite 1" geochemical suite being increasingly modified by the "Dacite 2" geochemical suite that became dominant during the third stage.

Pyroclastic flows ran down the slopes of the volcano, entered the Río Tambo valley and formed dams on the river, probably mainly at the mouth of the Quebrada Aguas Blancas; one of the two dammed lakes was about 28 km (17 mi) long. When the dams failed, the lakes released hot water with floating pumice and debris down the Río Tambo. The deposits permanently altered the course of the river. The volume of the ignimbrites has been estimated to be about 2 km^{3} (0.48 cu mi), excluding the ash that was erupted during this stage. The pyroclastic flows along with pumice falls covered an area of about 950 km^{2} (370 sq mi).

In the third stage, Vulcanian eruptions took place at Huaynaputina and deposited another ash layer; it is thinner than the layer produced by the first stage eruption and appears to be partly of phreatomagmatic origin. During this stage the volcano also emitted lava bombs; the total volume of erupted tephra is about 1.5 km^{3} (0.36 cu mi). This third stage destroyed the lava dome and formed the third vent, which then began to settle along the faults as the underlying magma was exhausted. The fourth vent formed late during the eruption, outside of the amphitheatre.

=== Witness observations ===
The eruption was accompanied by intense earthquakes, deafening explosions and noises that could be heard beyond Lima and as far away as 1,000 km (620 mi). In Arequipa, the sky was illuminated by lightning, and ash fell so thick that houses collapsed. The noise of the eruption was perceived as resembling artillery fire. There and in Copacabana the sky became dark. The blasts of the eruption could be heard (anecdotally) as far as Argentina and in the coastal localities of Lima, Chiquiabo and Arica. In these coastal localities it was thought that the sound came from naval engagements, likely with English corsairs. In view of this, the Viceroy of Peru sent reinforcement troops to El Callao. Closer to the vents, inhabitants of the village of Puquina saw large tongues of fire rising into the sky from Huaynaputina before they were enveloped by raining pumice and ash.

=== Caldera collapse ===
It was initially assumed that caldera collapse took place during the 1600 event, as accounts of the eruption stated that the volcano was obliterated to its foundation; later investigation suggested otherwise. Normally very large volcanic eruptions are accompanied by the formation of a caldera, but exceptions do exist. This might reflect either the regional tectonics or the absence of a shallow magma chamber, which prevented the collapse of the chamber from reaching the surface; most of the magma erupted in 1600 originated at a depth of 20 km (12 mi). Some collapse structures did nevertheless develop at Huaynaputina, in the form of two not readily recognizable circular areas within the amphitheatre and around the three vents, probably when the magmatic system depressurized during the eruption. Also, part of the northern flank of the amphitheatre collapsed during the eruption, and some of the debris fell into the Río Tambo canyon.

=== Volume and products ===
The 1600 eruption had a Volcanic Explosivity Index of 6 and is considered to be the only major explosive eruption of the Andes in historical time. It is the largest volcanic eruption throughout South America in historical time, (Note: The prehistoric eruption of Cerro Blanco in Argentina about 2,300 ± 60 BCE exceeded the size of Huaynaputina's.) as well as one of the largest in the last millennium and the largest historical eruption in the Western Hemisphere. It was larger than the 1883 eruption of Krakatoa in Indonesia and the 1991 eruption of Pinatubo in the Philippines. Huaynaputina's eruption column was high enough to penetrate the tropopause and influence the climate of Earth.

The total volume of volcanic rocks erupted by Huaynaputina was about 30 km^{3} (7.2 cu mi), in the form of dacitic tephra, pyroclastic flows and pyroclastic surges, although smaller estimates have been proposed. It appears that the bulk of the fallout originated during the first stage of the eruption, the second and third stage contributing a relatively small portion. For comparison, another large Holocene eruption in the Central Andes—the eruption of Cerro Blanco in Argentina about 2,300 ± 60 BCE—produced a bulk volume of 110 km^{3} (26 cu mi) of rock, equivalent to a Volcanic Explosivity Index of 7. Estimates have been made for the dense-rock equivalent of the Huaynaputina eruption, ranging between 4.6 and 11 km^{3} (1.1 and 2.6 cu mi), with a 2019 estimate, that accounts for far-flung tephra, of 13–14 km^{3} (3.1–3.4 cu mi).

==== Tephra fallout ====
Map of the tephra fallout

Ash fall from Huaynaputina reached a thickness of 1 cm (0.39 in) within a 95,000 km^{2} (37,000 sq mi) area of southern Peru, Bolivia and Chile, and of over 1 m (3 ft 3 in) closer to the volcano. The tephra was deposited in a major westerly lobe and a minor northerly lobe; this is an unusual distribution, as tephra from volcanoes in the Central Andes is usually carried eastward by winds. The deposition of the tephra was influenced by topography and wind changes during the eruption, which led to changes in the fallout pattern. The ash deposits from the eruption are visible to this day, and several archeological sites are preserved under them.

Some tephra was deposited on the volcanoes El Misti and Ubinas, into lakes of southern Peru such as Laguna Salinas, possibly into a peat bog close to Sabancaya volcano where it reached thicknesses of 5–10 cm (2.0–3.9 in), as far south as in the Peruvian Atacama Desert where it forms discontinuous layers, and possibly to the Cordillera Vilcabamba in the north. Ash layers about 8–12 cm (3.1–4.7 in) thick were noted in the ice caps of Quelccaya in Peru and Sajama in Bolivia, although the deposits in Sajama may instead have originated from Ticsani volcano. Reports of Huaynaputina-related ashfall in Nicaragua are implausible, as Nicaragua is far from Huaynaputina and has several local volcanoes that could generate tephra fallout.

The Huaynaputina ash layer has been used as a tephrochronological marker for the region, for example in archeology and in geology, where it was used to date an eruption in the Andagua volcanic field and fault movements that could have produced destructive earthquakes. The ash layer, which may have reached as far as East Rongbuk Glacier at Mount Everest in the Himalaya, has also been used as a tephrochronological marker in Greenland and Antarctic ice cores. It has been proposed as a marker for the onset of the Anthropocene.

=== Local impact ===
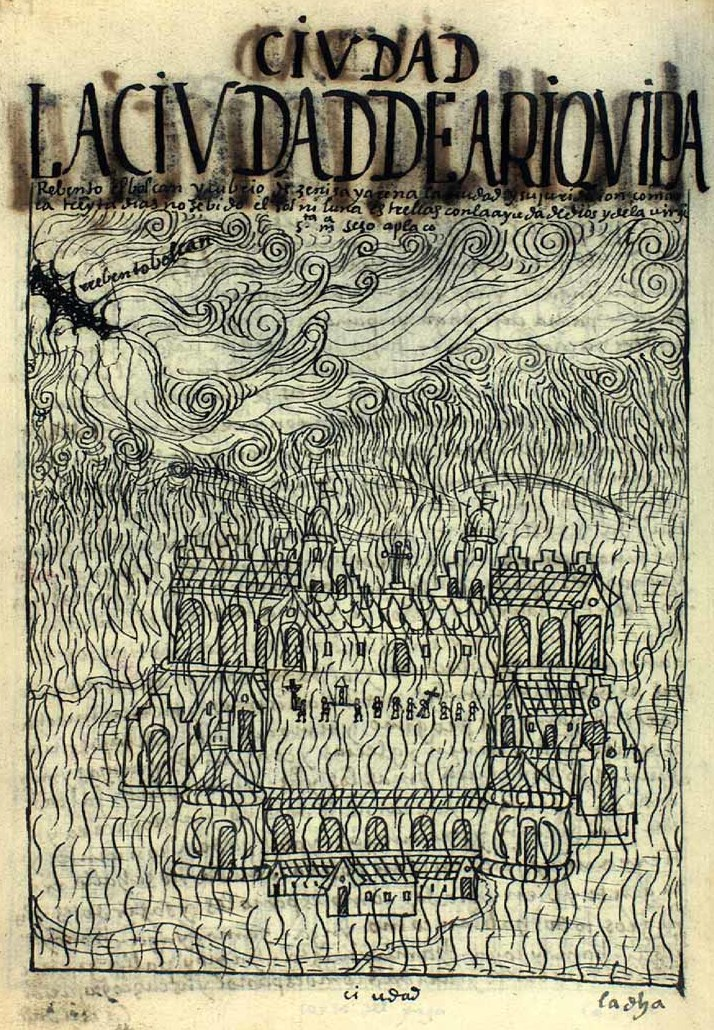
1615 illustration of the ashfall on Arequipa

The eruption had a devastating impact on the region. Ash falls and pumice falls buried the surroundings beneath more than 2 m (6 ft 7 in) of rocks, while pyroclastic flows incinerated everything within their path, wiping out vegetation over a large area. Of the volcanic phenomena, the ash and pumice falls were the most destructive. These and the debris and pyroclastic flows devastated an area of about 40 km × 70 km (25 mi × 43 mi) around Huaynaputina, and both crops and livestock sustained severe damage.

Between 11 and 17 villages within 20 km (12 mi) from the volcano were buried by the ash, including Calicanto, Chimpapampa, Cojraque, Estagagache, Moro Moro and San Juan de Dios south and southwest of Huaynaputina. The Huayruro Project began in 2015 and aims to rediscover these towns, and Calicanto was christened one of the 100 International Union of Geological Sciences heritage sites in 2021. The death toll in villages from toxic gases and ash fall was severe; reportedly, some villages lost their entire populations to the eruption and a priest visiting Omate after the eruption claimed to have "found its inhabitants dead and cooked with the fire of the burning stones". Estagagache has been deemed the "Pompeii of Peru", and the Peruvian Geological, Mining and Metallurgy Institute has published reports detailing geotourism (Note: Geotourism is a type of tourism to sites with geologic features, like active volcanoes.) locations around the volcano.

The impact was noticeable in Arequipa, where up to 1 m (3.3 ft) of ash fell causing roofs to collapse under its weight. Ash fall was reported in an area of 300,000 km^{2} (120,000 sq mi) across Peru, Chile and Bolivia, mostly west and south from the volcano, including in La Paz, Cuzco, Camaná, where it was thick enough to cause palm trees to collapse, Potosi, Arica as well as in Lima where it was accompanied by sounds of explosions. Ships observed ash fall from as far as 1,000 km (620 mi) west of the coast.

The surviving local population fled during the eruption and wild animals sought refuge in the city of Arequipa. The site of Torata Alta, a former Inka administrative centre, was destroyed during the Huaynaputina eruption and after a brief reoccupation abandoned in favour of Torata. Likewise, the occupation of the site of Pillistay close to Camana ended shortly after the eruption. Together with earthquakes unrelated to the eruption and El Niño-related flooding, the Huaynaputina eruption led to the abandonment of some irrigated land in Carrizal, Peru.

The eruption claimed 1,000–1,500 fatalities, not counting these from earthquakes or flooding on the Río Tambo. In Arequipa, houses and the cathedral collapsed during mass after an earthquake on 27 February, concomitant with the beginning of the second stage of the eruption. Tsunamis were reported during the eruption as well. Flooding ensued when volcanic dams in the Río Tambo broke, and debris and lahars reached the Pacific Ocean 120–130 km (75–81 mi) away. Occasionally the flows that reached the Pacific Ocean have been described as pyroclastic flows. Reportedly, fish were killed by the flood in the Pacific Ocean at the mouth of the river.

Damage to infrastructure and economic resources of the southern then-Viceroyalty of Peru was severe. The colonial wine industry in southern Peru was wiped out; chroniclers tell how all wines were lost during the eruption and the tsunamis that accompanied it. Before the eruption the Moquegua region had been a source of wine, and afterwards the focus of viticulture shifted to Pisco, Ica and Nazca; later sugarcane became an important crop in Moquegua valley. Tephra fallout fertilized the soil and may have allowed increased agriculture in certain areas. Cattle ranching also was severely impacted by the 1600 eruption. The Arequipa and Moquegua areas were depopulated by epidemics and famine; recovery only began towards the end of the 17th century. Indigenous people from the Quinistacas valley moved to Moquegua because the valley was covered with ash; population movements resulting from the Huaynaputina eruption and a 1604 earthquake may have occurred as far away as Bolivia. The then-Viceroy of Peru, Luis de Velasco, 1st Marquess of Salinas del Río Pisuerga, arrived weeks later in Arequipa. After returning to Lima, he sent dispatches to king Philip III of Spain and the Council of the Indies to request economic assistance. Religious and political authorities mobilized to respond to the eruption and its effects. Taxes were suspended for years, and indigenous workers were recruited from as far as Lake Titicaca and Cuzco to aid in the reconstruction. Arequipa went from being a relatively wealthy city to be a place of famine and disease in the years after the eruption, and its port of Chule was abandoned. Despite the damage, recovery was fast in Arequipa. The population declined in the region, although some of the decline may be due to earthquakes and epidemics before 1600. New administrative surveys – called revisitas – had to be carried out in the Colca Valley in 1604 after population losses and the effects of the Huaynaputina eruption had reduced the ability of the local population to pay the tributes.

==== Religious responses ====
Historians' writings about conditions in Arequipa tell of religious processions seeking to soothe the divine anger, people praying all day and those who had lost faith in the church resorting to magic spells as the eruption was underway, while in Moquegua children were reportedly running around, women screaming and numerous anecdotes of people who survived eruption or did not exist. In the city of Arequipa church authorities organized a series of processions, requiem masses and exorcisms in response to the eruption. In Copacabana and La Paz, there were religious processions, the churches opened their doors and people prayed. Some indigenous people organized their own rituals which included feasting on whatever food and drink they had and battering dogs that were hanged alive. The apparent effectiveness of the Christian rituals led many previously hesitant indigenous inhabitants to embrace Christianity and abandon their clandestine native religion.

News of the event was propagated throughout the American colonies and to Europe. Both Christians and native people of Peru interpreted the eruption in religious context. The Spaniards interpreted the event as a divine punishment, while native people interpreted it as a deity fighting against the Spanish invaders; one myth states that Omate volcano (Huaynaputina) wanted the assistance of Arequipa volcano (probably El Misti) to destroy the Spaniards but the latter could not, claiming that he was Christian now, and so Huaynaputina proceeded alone. Another states that instead, Huaynaputina asked Machuputina (Misti) to deal with the Catholic Arequipa; when the latter refused as it too had become Catholic Huaynaputina exploded from anger. El Misti had erupted less than two centuries before, and local populations were further concerned that after Huaynaputina, El Misti might erupt next. As a result, natives and Franciscan friars threw sacrifices such as relics of saints into its crater. Shamans in the Tambo valley urged a return to old customs, and processions and sacrifices to Huaynaputina took place. In Arequipa, a new patron saint, San Genaro, (Note: San Genaro had been called due to his responses to eruptions of the Vesuvius volcano in the Kingdom of Naples.) was named following the eruption and veneration of Martha – who was believed to have power over earthquakes – increased; she became the city's sole patron saint in 1693.

Reportedly, in November 1599 a Jesuit named Alonzo Ruiz had announced in Arequipa that divine punishment would strike the natives for continuing to worship their gods and the Spaniards for promiscuity. Mythology held that before the 1600 eruption the lack of sacrifices had upset the devil. It sent a large snake (Note: In Andean mythology, earth motions are often associated with snakes.) named chipiroque or pichiniqui to announce "horrifying storms" which eventually ended up killing the natives. Jesuits interpreted this as a deception attempt by the devil. Such prophecies may reflect prior knowledge about the volcanic nature of Huaynaputina. There are reports that a sacrificial offering was underway at the volcano a few days before the eruption.

=== Global atmospheric impacts of the 1600 eruption ===
After the eruption, anomalies in the appearance of the sun were described in Europe and China as a "dimming" or "reddening" "haze" that reduced the sun's luminosity in a cloudless sky and reduced the visibility of shadows. Vivid sunsets and sunrises were noted. A darkened lunar eclipse described by observers in Graz, Austria, in 1601 may have been the consequence of the Huaynaputina aerosols.

Acid layers in ice cores from Antarctica and Greenland have been attributed to Huaynaputina, and their discovery led to initial discussion about whether the 1600 eruption had major effects on Earth's climate. In Antarctica these ice cores include both acid layers and volcanic tephra. The total amount of sulfuric acid erupted by Huaynaputina has been estimated at several values:

List of estimates of sulfuric acid yield of the 1600 eruption
Estimate of sulfuric acid erupted	Location (if mentioned)	Ref.
100 million tons	Southern Hemisphere	
42 million tons	Northern Hemisphere	
56.59 million tons	Global	
34.5 (Note: 46 million tons according to Arfeuille et al. 2014 which refers to sulfate aerosols consisting of 75% sulfuric acid, thus corrected by a factor 3/4.) million tons	Northern Hemisphere	

Other estimates are 50–100 million tons for the sulfur dioxide yield and 23 or 26–55 million tons for the sulfur. In Antarctica the sulfur yield was estimated to be about one-third that of the 1815 Tambora eruption, although the climate impact in the Northern Hemisphere might have been aggravated by the distribution of the aerosols and the occurrence of another volcanic eruption in the Northern Hemisphere in winter 1599/1600; at one Antarctic site the Huaynaputina sulfate layer is thicker than the one from Tambora. Inferences from rock composition usually yield a higher sulfur output than ice core data; this may reflect either ice cores underestimating the amount of sulfur erupted as ice cores only record stratospheric sulfur, ice cores underestimating the amount of sulfur for other reasons or overestimating the amount of sulfur contained within magma-associated fluids. The Huaynaputina eruption was probably unusually rich in sulfur compared to its volume. A large amount of sulfur appears to have been carried in a volatile phase associated with the magma rather than in the magma proper. An even larger amount of sulfur may have originated from a relic hydrothermal system that underpins the volcano, and whose accumulated sulfur would have been mobilized by the 1600 eruption; some contradictions between the sulfur yield inferred from ice core data and these inferred from the magma composition can be resolved this way.

Atmospheric carbon dioxide concentrations in 1610 decreased for reasons unknown; the depopulation of Europe during the 14th century and high mortality in the Americas after the European arrival may be the reason, but this decrease could have been at least in part the consequence of the Huaynaputina eruption. The vast tephra fallout of the eruption fell in part over the sea; the fertilizing effect of the tephra may have induced a draw-down of carbon dioxide from the atmosphere.

==== Climate impacts ====
Volcanic eruptions alter worldwide climate by injecting ash and gases into the atmosphere, which reduce the amount of sunlight reaching the Earth, often causing cold weather and crop failures. The Huaynaputina eruption decreased the amount on solar energy reaching Earth by about 1.9 W/m^{2}. (Note: For comparison, the solar constant regarding Earth is about 1367 W/m^{2}.) The summer of 1601 was among the coldest in the Northern Hemisphere during the last six centuries, and the impact may have been comparable to that of the 1815 Tambora, 1452/1453 mystery eruption, 1257 Samalas and 536 mystery eruptions. Other volcanoes may have erupted alongside Huaynaputina and also contributed to the weather anomalies; several large volcanic eruptions took place in the decades preceding and following the Huaynaputina eruption.

The eruption had a noticeable impact on growth conditions in the Northern Hemisphere, which were the worst of the last 600 years, with summers being on average 0.8 °C (1.4 °F) colder than the mean. The climate impact has been noted in the growth rings of a centuries-old ocean quahog (a mollusc) individual that was found in Iceland, as well as in tree rings from Taiwan, eastern Tibet, (Note: Although other reconstructions have been interpreted as signalling a warm period at that time.) Siberia, the Urals and Yamal Peninsula in Russia, Canada, the Sierra Nevada and White Mountains in the United States, Lake Zaysan in Kazakhstan and in Mexico. Notably, the climate impacts became manifest only in 1601; in the preceding year, they may have been suppressed by a strong El Niño event.

Other climate effects attributed to the Huaynaputina eruption include:

- In climate simulations, after the 1600 eruption a strengthening of the Atlantic meridional overturning circulation is observed along with sea ice growth, followed after a delay by a phase of decreased strength.
- An extraordinarily strong El Niño event in 1607–1608 and a concomitant northward shift of the Southern Hemisphere storm tracks have been attributed to the Huaynaputina eruption.
- Intense winds were reported from the present-day Philippines. Manila galleons reportedly were faster when crossing the Pacific Ocean after 1600, perhaps owing to volcanically induced wind changes.
- A change in the Atlantic Multidecadal Variability around 1600 has been attributed to the Huaynaputina eruption.

==== Long-term climate effects ====
Temperatures decreased for a long time after the Huaynaputina eruption in the extratropical Northern Hemisphere. Together with the 1257 Samalas eruption and the 1452/1453 mystery eruption, the Huaynaputina eruption may have led to the Little Ice Age, or to the coldest period of the Little Ice Age in Europe during the "Grindelwald Fluctuation" between 1560 and 1630. Glacier growth, Arctic sea ice expansion and climatic cooling has been noted after these eruptions, and a cooling peak occurred around the time of the Huaynaputina eruption. In general, volcanic sulfate aerosol production was higher during the Little Ice Age than before or after it. In the Andes, the Little Ice Age had already begun before the 1600 eruption, although a major expansion of glaciers in the Peruvian Cordillera Blanca occurred at the time.

The 1600 eruption of Huaynaputina occurred at the tail end of a cluster of mid-sized volcanic eruptions, which in a climate simulation had a noticeable impact on Earth's energy balance and were accompanied by a 10% growth of Northern Hemisphere sea ice and a weakening of the subpolar gyre which may have begun already before the eruption. Such a change in the ocean currents has been described as being characteristic for the Little Ice Age and mediates numerous effects of the Little Ice Age, such as colder winters.

=== Distant consequences ===
==== North America ====
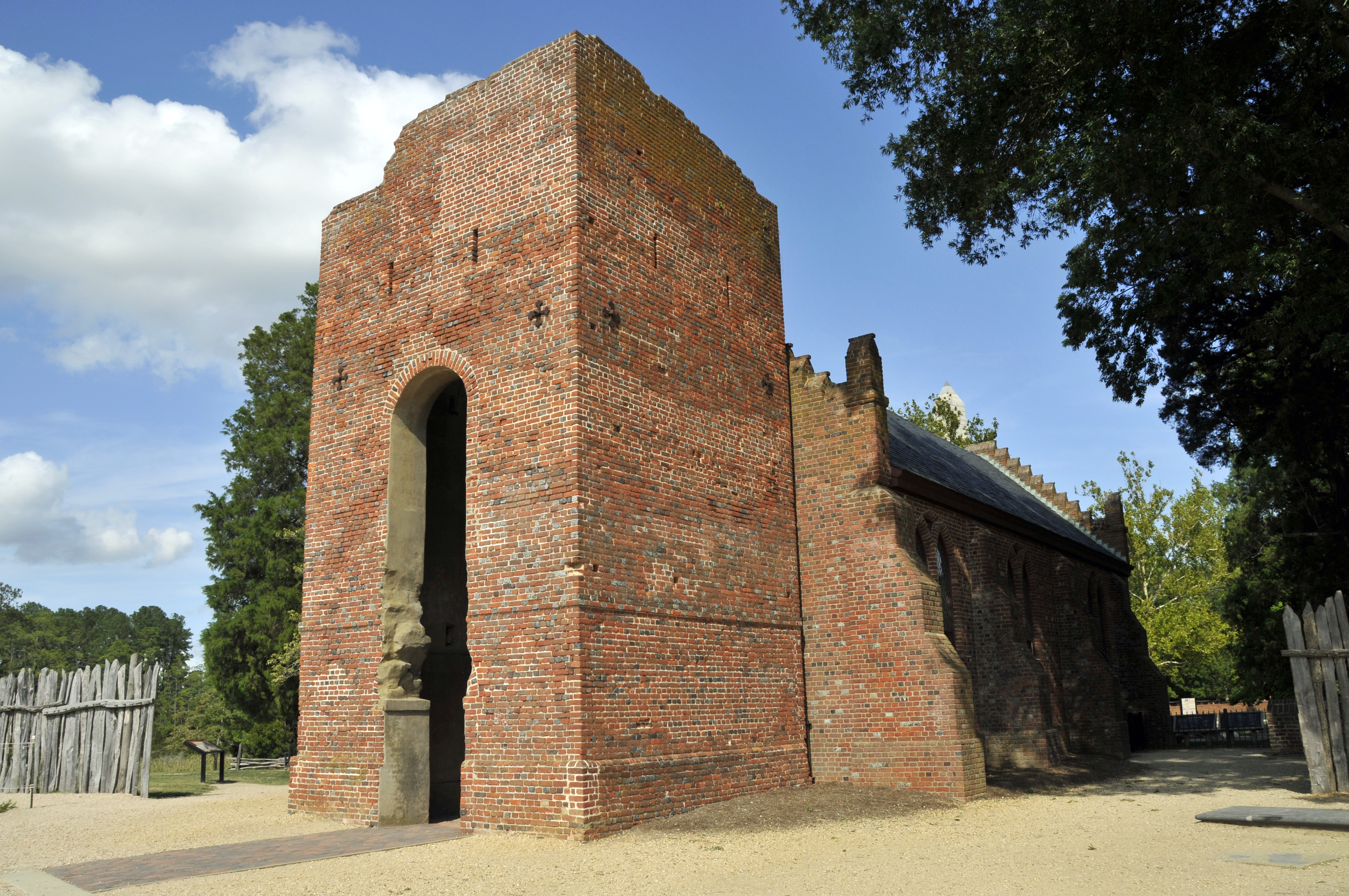
The church of the Jamestown colony, where the eruption appears to have caused a drought and high mortality

Thin tree rings and frost rings (Note: Frost rings are anomalous tree rings that form when frost occurs during the growing season.) potentially correlated to the Huaynaputina eruption have been found in trees of what today are the Northeastern and Western United States such as in Montana. Tree rings dating to 1601 and 1603 found close to the tree line in Quebec indicate cold temperatures, and anomalous tree rings and cooling in Idaho have been linked to the eruption as well. In 1601, the coldest temperature of the last 600 years was recorded in Seward Peninsula, Alaska, as well as in other places of northwestern and southeastern Alaska. Noticeable cooling has been inferred for the Western US from tree ring data. Weather in the Arctic Archipelago of Canada was unusually wet.

The Huaynaputina eruption was followed by a drought in what today are the Eastern U.S. and may have hindered the establishment of the colony in Jamestown, Virginia, where mortality from malnutrition was high. The eruption may also have contributed to the disappearance of the Monongahela culture from North America, along with other climate phenomena linked to the El Niño–Southern Oscillation.

===== California =====
A major flooding episode in 1605 ± 5 recorded from sediments of the Santa Barbara Basin has been attributed to the Huaynaputina eruption. A global cooling period associated with the Huaynaputina eruption as well as eruptions of Mount Etna and Quilotoa may have forced storm tracks and the jet stream south, causing floods in the Southwestern United States. At that time, flooding also took place in Silver Lake in the Mojave Desert, and Mono Lake rose to the highest level of the past millennium. There were also wet spells between 1599 and 1606 in the Sacramento River system, according to analysis of tree rings. Colder temperatures may have contributed to the flooding in Silver Lake, as they would have reduced evaporation.

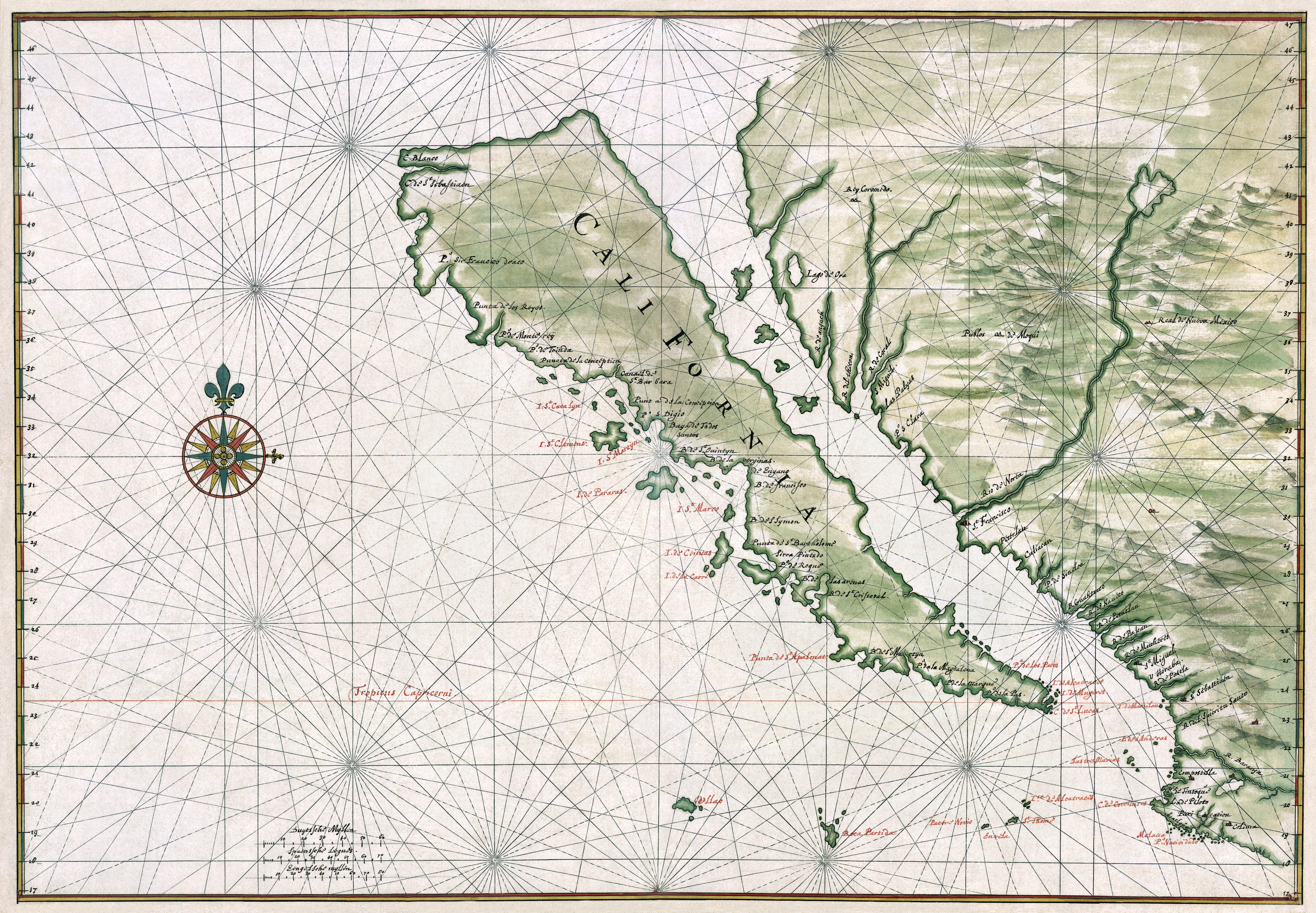
A 1650 map of California. The belief that it was an island may have been promoted by the flooding caused by the Huaynaputina eruption.

The Spanish explorers Sebastián Vizcaíno and Juan de Oñate visited the US west coast and the Colorado River Delta in the years following the Huaynaputina eruption. The effects of this eruption and the activity of other volcanoes – namely, large scale flooding – might have induced them to believe that California was an island; this later became one of the most well known cartographic misconceptions of history.

==== Western Europe ====
Tree rings indicate unusually cold weather in the Austrian Alps and Estonia, where the 1601–1602 winter became coldest in half a millennium. The summers in Quebec and Scandinavia after the eruption were the coldest of the past 420 years. Tree ring analysis suggested cooling in Greece, Lapland (Finland), the Pyrenees and central Spain, the Swiss Alps and Switzerland (in 1600) more generally, where reconstructed winter temperatures were the lowest of 1525–1860. Anomalous weather conditions relating to the 1600 eruption, possibly under additional influence from reduced solar activity, have been noted in sediment cores from peat bogs in England and Denmark. In Norway, cooling coinciding with the eruption was probably the reason for the development of palsas (Note: A palsa is a dome of peat with a frozen core that forms through ice dynamics.) in Færdesmyra that for the most part disappeared only in the 20th century. Sea ice expanded around Iceland.

The winter of 1601 was extremely cold in Estonia, Ireland, Latvia and Switzerland, and the ice in the harbour of Riga broke up late. Climate impacts were also reported from Croatia. The 1601 wine harvest was delayed in France, and in Germany it was drastically lower in 1602. Frost continued into summer in Italy and England. A further cold winter occurred in 1602–1603 in Ireland. In Estonia, high mortality and crop failures from 1601 to 1603 led to an at least temporary abandonment of three quarters of all farms. Scotland saw the failure of barley and oat crops in 1602 and a plague outbreak during the preceding year, and in Italy silk prices rose due to a decline in silk production in the peninsula.

In Fennoscandia, the summer of 1601 was one of the coldest in the last four centuries. In Sweden, harvest failures are recorded between 1601 and 1603, with a rainy spring in 1601 reportedly leading to famine. Famine ensued there and in Denmark and Norway during 1602–1603. Finland saw one of the worst barley and rye harvests, and crop yields continued to be poor for some years to follow, accompanied by a colder climate there. The year 1601 was called a "green year" in Sweden and a "straw year" or "year of extensive frosts" in Finland, and it is likely that the 1601 crop failure was among the worst in Finland's history. The Huaynaputina eruption together with other factors led to changes in the social structure of Ostrobothnia, where a number of land holdings were deserted after the eruption and peasants with wider social networks had higher chances to cope with crises than these without.

==== Russia ====
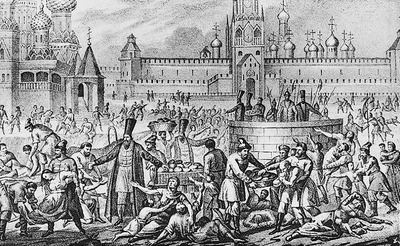
A 19th century engraving showing the 1601 famine in Russia

Ice cores in the Russian Altai Mountains noted a strong cooling around 1601, with tree ring data also recording a cooling of 3.5 °C (6.3 °F). Cooling was also noted in tree rings of the Kola Peninsula and ice cores on Novaya Zemlya, where glacier melting rates declined.

The summer 1601 was wet, and the winter 1601–1602 was severe. The eruption led to the Russian famine of 1601–1603 after crops failed during these years; it is considered to be the worst famine of Russian history and claimed about two million lives, a third of the country's population. The events initiated the time of social unrest known as the Time of Troubles, and the tzar Boris Godunov was overthrown in part owing to the social impacts of the famine. This social unrest eventually led to a change in the ruling dynasty and interventions from Sweden and Poland.

==== Balkans and Ottoman Empire ====
Before the Huaynaputina eruption, severe droughts in Anatolia during 1591–1596 caused harvest failures. Intense snowfall and cold affected the countries of the Balkans and the Aegean Sea during the winters after the Huaynaputina eruption, forcing countries to acquire grain from abroad. The Ottoman-Bosnian chronicler İbrahim Peçevi reported that in 1601 the Danube froze and travel was hindered by snow. The extremely cold winters that followed, associated with Huaynaputina's eruption and an eruption of Nevado del Ruiz in 1595, caused epizootics that killed large numbers of livestock in Anatolia, Crimea and the Balkans. This weakened the Ottoman Empire just as it was conducting the Long Turkish War and appears to have contributed to the onset of the Celali rebellions in Anatolia.

==== China ====
Chronicles during the reign of Emperor Wanli from northern China mention severe frosts in 1601 and frequently cold weather, including snowfall in Huai'an County and Hebei and severe frost in Gansu, Shanxi and Hebei during summer. The frosts destroyed crops, causing famines severe enough that cannibalism took place. Epidemics in Shanxi and Shaanxi have also been linked to Huaynaputina. The cold snap was apparently limited to 1601, as there are no reports of extremely cold weather in the subsequent years.

Weather was anomalous in southern China as well, 1601 seeing a hot autumn and a cold summer and abrupt snowfall. Disease outbreaks occurred afterwards. Reports of snowfall and unusual cold also came from the Yangtze River valley, and summer in the Anhui, Shanghai and Zhejiang provinces began unusually with cold and snowy weather and then became hot.

==== Asia outside of China ====
Unusually narrow or entirely missing tree rings formed in 1601 in trees close to Khövsgöl Nuur lake, and tree ring records show decreased temperatures in Taiwan. Severe droughts recorded over the Tibetan Plateau in 1602 may have been caused by the Huaynaputina eruption. The eruption would have decreased the atmospheric water content and thus the strength of the monsoonal moisture transport towards the plateau. Likewise, droughts recorded in cave deposits of southern Thailand have been related to the Huaynaputina eruption and may reflect a typical response of tropical rainfall to volcanic events.

In Japan, Lake Suwa froze up considerably earlier than normal in 1601, and flooding and continuous rains were accompanied by harvest failures. Korea in 1601 saw an unusually cold spring and summer, followed by a humid and hot mid-summer. Epidemics ensued, although the epidemics in East Asia erupted under different weather conditions and linking them to the Huaynaputina eruption may not be straightforward. On the other hand, temperatures were not unusually cold in Nepal.

== Hazards and volcanological research ==
About 30,000 people live in the immediate area of Huaynaputina today, and over 69,000 and 1,000,000 live in the nearby cities of Moquegua and Arequipa, respectively. The towns of Calacoa, Omate, Puquina and Quinistaquillas and others would be threatened in case of renewed eruptions. A repeat of the 1600 eruption would likely cause a considerably greater death toll owing to population growth since 1600, as well as causing substantial socioeconomic disruption in the Andes. Evacuation of the area directly around the volcano would be difficult owing to the poor state of the roads, and the tephra fallout would impact much of Peru's economy. The 1600 eruption is often used as a worst-case scenario model for eruptions at Peruvian volcanoes. Huaynaputina is classified as a "high-risk volcano". In 2017, the Peruvian Geophysical Institute announced that Huaynaputina would be monitored by the future Southern Volcanological Observatory, and in 2019 seismic monitoring of the volcano began. As of 2021, there are three seismometers and one device measuring volcano deformation on Huaynaputina.

During the wet season, mudflows often descend from Huaynaputina. In 2010, earthquake activity and noises from the volcano alerted the local population and led to a volcanological investigation. As part of this investigation, seismic activity was recorded around the amphitheatre; there were no earthquakes within it and appeared to be associated mainly with the faults and lineaments in the region. The researchers recommended more extensive seismometer coverage of the area and regular sampling of fumaroles, as well as reconnaissance with georadar and of the electrical potential of the volcano.

== Climate and vegetation ==
Between 4,000–5,000 m (13,000–16,000 ft) in elevation average temperatures are about 6 °C (43 °F) with cold nights, while at Omate, mean temperatures reach 15 °C (59 °F) with little seasonal variation. Precipitation averages 154.8 mm/a (6.09 in/year), falling mainly during a summer wet season between December and March. This results in an arid climate, where little erosion occurs and volcanic products are well preserved. Vegetation in the area of Huaynaputina is scarce; (Note: A groundsel, Senecio huaynaputinaensis, was discovered on Huaynaputina's deposits and named after the volcano.) only during the wet season do plants grow on the pumice deposits from the 1600 eruption. Cacti can be found on rocky outcrops and valley bottoms.

== See also ==
- Corral de Coquena
- Timeline of volcanism on Earth
