= Pucasaya (Moquegua) =

Mountain in Peru

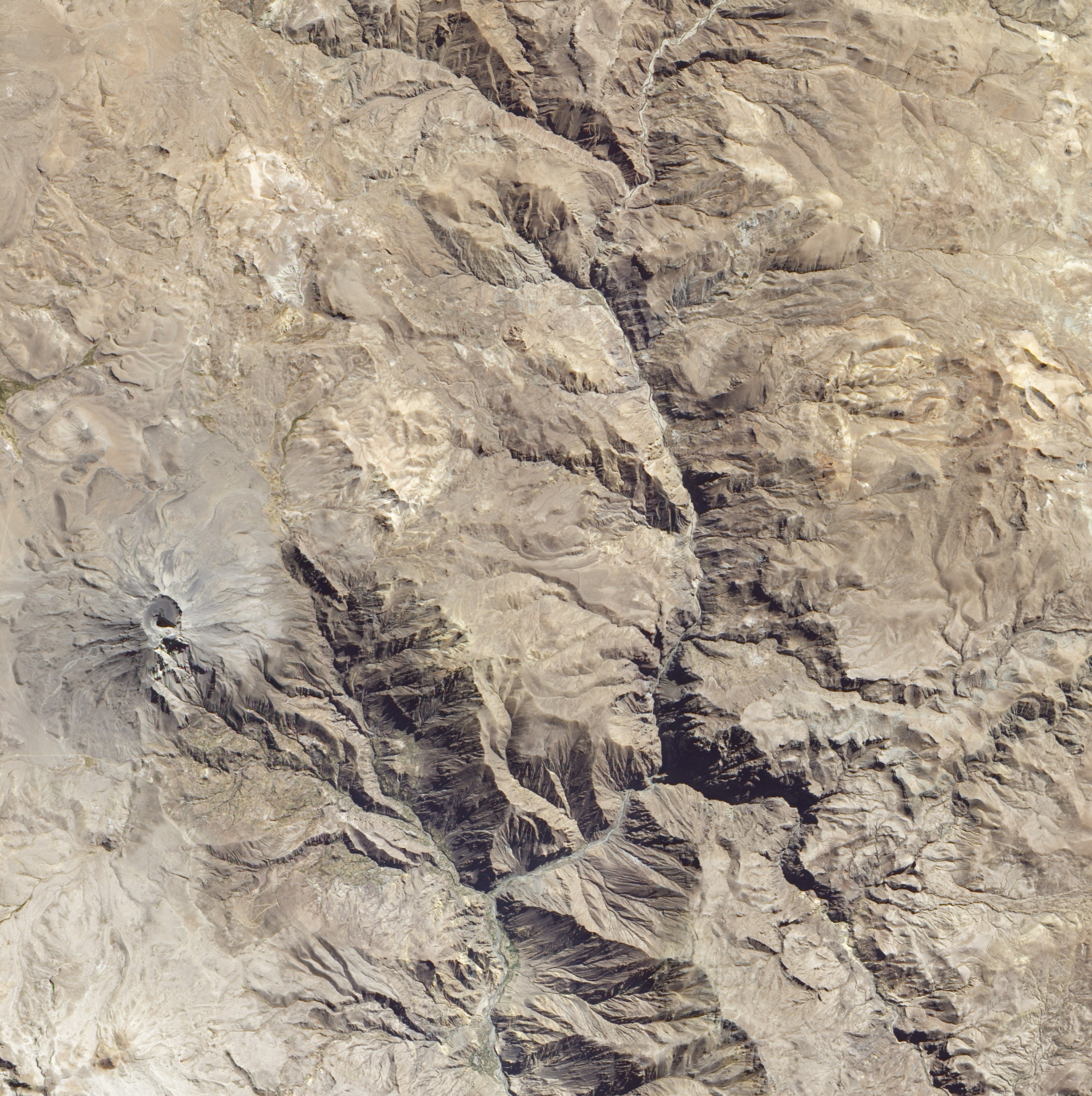
- Satellite image of the volcano Ubinas (on the left) and Pucasaya (lower left)

Highest point
- Elevation: 5,320 m (17,450 ft)
- Coordinates: 16°27′33″S 70°56′10″W

Geography
- Location within Peru
- Location: Peru, Moquegua Region, General Sanchez Cerro Province
- Parent range: Andes

Pucasaya (possibly from Quechua puka red, saya slope, "red slope") is a 5,320-metre-high (17,454 ft) mountain in the Andes of Peru. It is situated southeast of the salt lake named Salinas. The mountain is located in the Moquegua Region, General Sánchez Cerro Province, Matalaque District, southwest of the active Ubinas volcano. Pucasaya lies on the southern border of the buffer zone of the Salinas and Aguada Blanca National Reservation.

== See also ==
- Pachakutiq
- Qillqata
