= Pachakutiq (Arequipa-Moquegua) =

Mountain in Peru

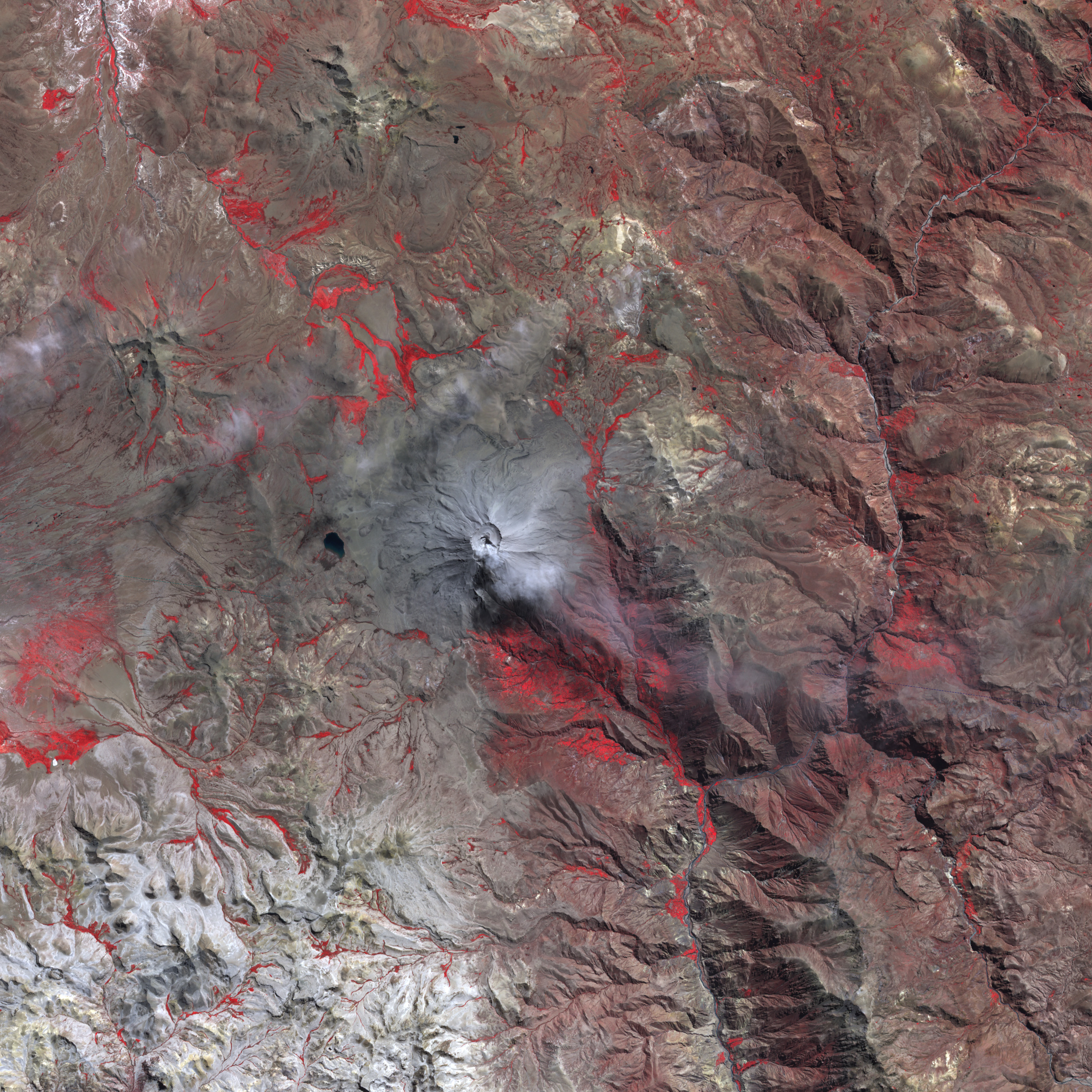
- The Ubinas volcano and Pachakutiq southwest of it (lower left) as seen from above (NASA, 2006)

Highest point
- Elevation: 5,173 m (16,972 ft)
- Coordinates: 16°27′18″S 71°2′47″W

Geography
- Location within Peru
- Location: Peru, Arequipa Region, Arequipa Province, Moquegua Region, General Sánchez Cerro Province
- Parent range: Andes

Pachakutiq (Quechua pacha time, space, kuti return, "return of time", "change of time", pacha kuti "great change or disturbance in the social or political order", -q a suffix, Pachakutiq an Inca emperor, Hispanicized spelling Pachacutec) is a 5,173-metre-high (16,972 ft) mountain in the Andes of Peru. It is located southeast of Lake Salinas in the Arequipa Region, Arequipa Province, Tarucani District, and in the Moquegua Region, General Sánchez Cerro Province, Coalaque District. Pachakutiq lies northwest of Q'uwa Laki and Qillqata.

== See also ==
- Takuni
