= Coalaque District =

Coordinates: 16.6490°S 71.0209°W

Coalaque
- District
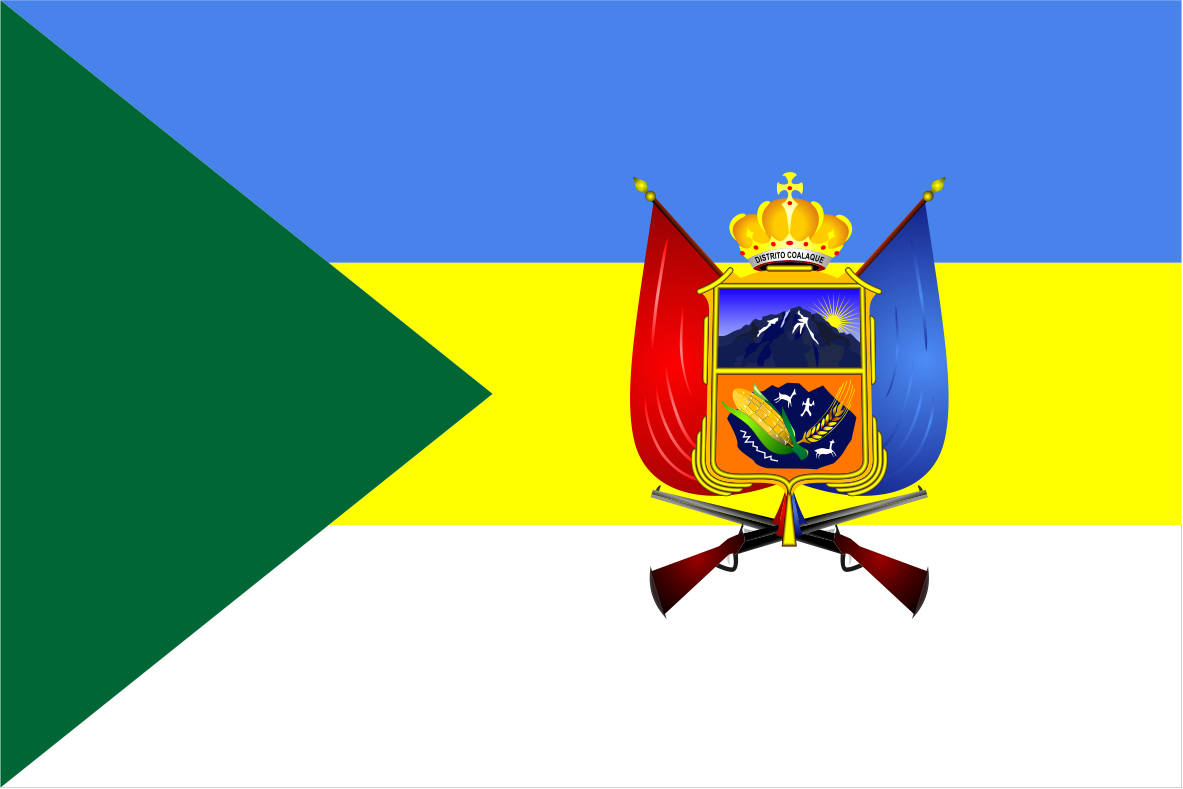
- Flag of Coalaque
- Interactive map of Coalaque
- Country: Peru
- Region: Moquegua
- Province: General Sánchez Cerro
- Founded: January 26, 1956
- Capital: Coalaque

Government
  - Mayor: Raul Rey Arambulo Alvarez

Area
  - Total: 247.58 km^{2} (95.59 sq mi)
- Elevation: 2,283 m (7,490 ft)

Population (2005 census)
  - Total: 1,595
  - Density: 6.442/km^{2} (16.69/sq mi)
- Time zone: UTC-5 (PET)
- UBIGEO: 180203

Coalaque District is one of eleven districts of the General Sánchez Cerro Province in Peru.

== Geography ==
One of the highest peaks of the district is Qillqata at approximately 5,200 m (17,100 ft). Other mountains are listed below:

- Apachita
- Japu Pata
- Misani
- Pachakutiq
- Paqu Urqu
- Q'uwa Laki
- Wawayuq
- Wilani
