= Qillqata (Arequipa-Moquegua) =

Mountain in Peru

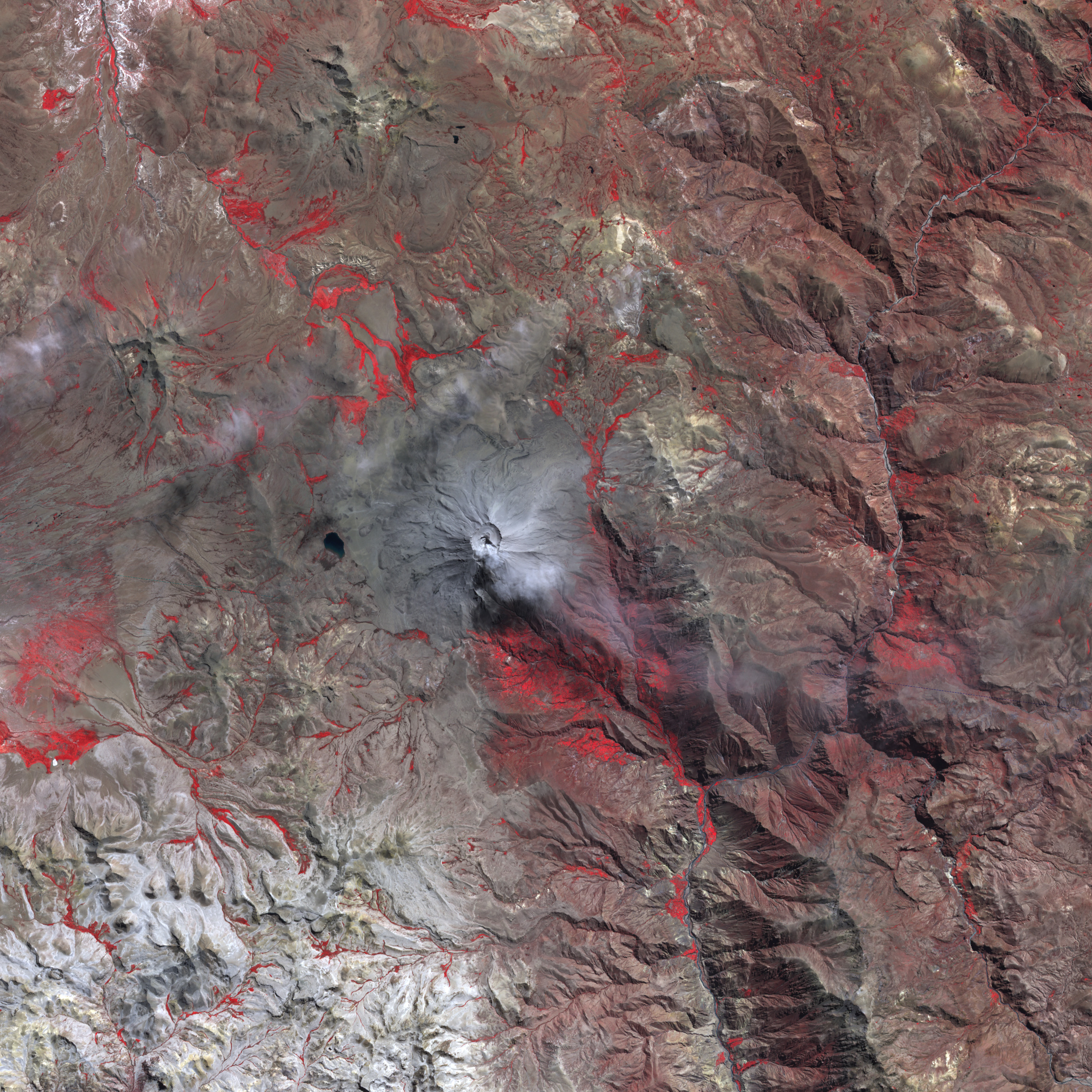
- The Ubinas volcano and Qillqata southwest of it (lower left) as seen from above (NASA, 2006)

Highest point
- Elevation: 5,200 m (17,100 ft)
- Coordinates: 16°29′55″S 71°00′46.5″W

Geography
- Location within Peru
- Location: Peru, Arequipa Region, Arequipa Province, Moquegua Region, General Sanchez Cerro Province
- Parent range: Andes

Qillqata (Aymara qillqaña to write, -ta a suffix to indicate the participle, "written" or "something written", Hispanicized Quelcata) is a mountain in the Andes of Peru, about 5,200 metres (17,060 ft) high. It is located southeast of Lake Salinas in the Arequipa Region, Arequipa Province, Tarucani District, and in the Moquegua Region, General Sánchez Cerro Province, Coalaque District. Some of the highest mountains near Qillqata are Wilani in the northeast, Q'uwa Laki in the southeast and Pachakutiq.

== See also ==
- Takuni
