= Wilani =

Mountain in Peru

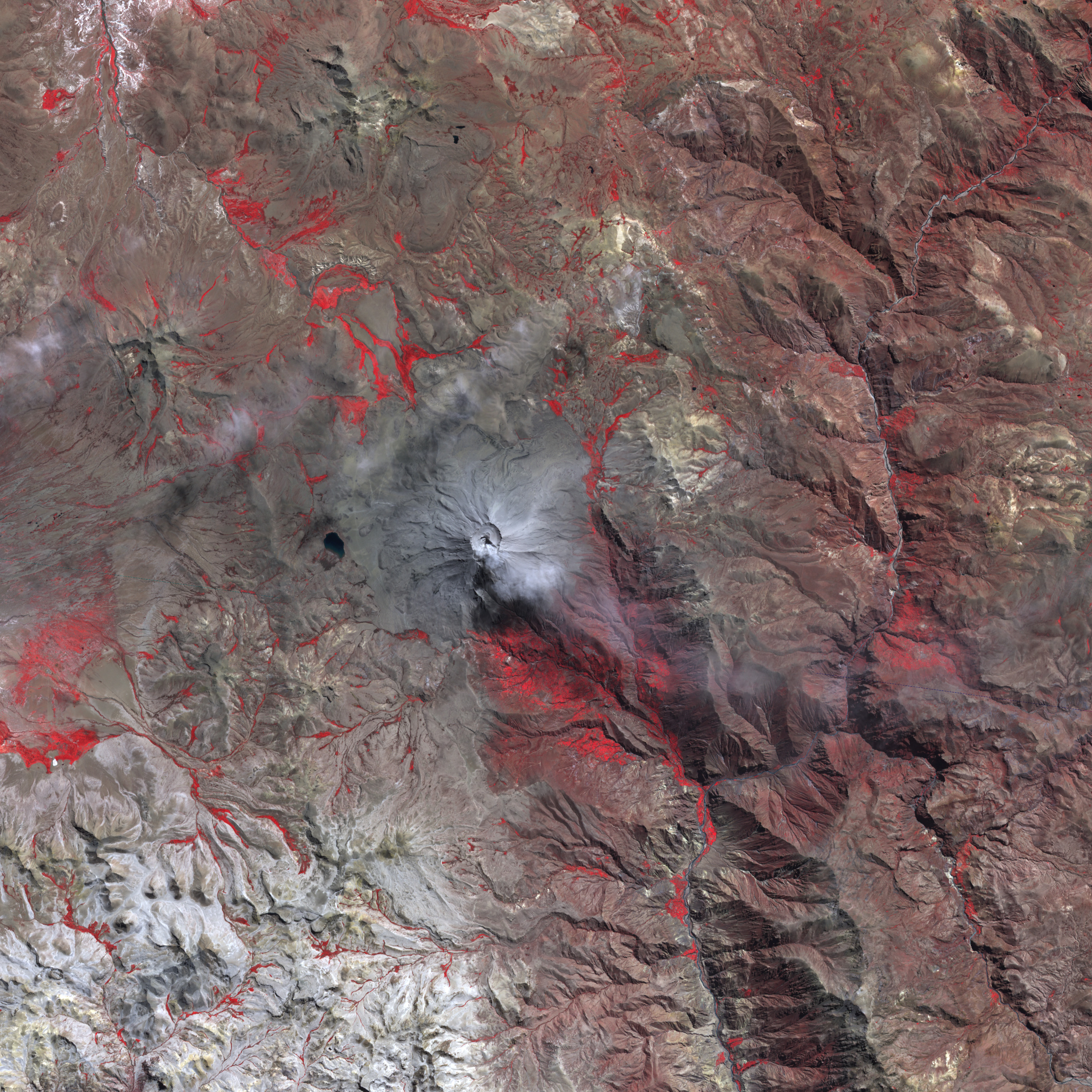
- The Ubinas volcano and Wilani southwest of it (lower left) as seen from above (NASA, 2006)

Highest point
- Elevation: 5,200 m (17,100 ft)
- Coordinates: 16°28′50″S 70°58′45″W

Geography
- Location within Peru
- Location: Peru, Arequipa Region, Moquegua Region
- Parent range: Andes

Wilani (Aymara wila blood, blood-red, -ni a suffix to indicate ownership, "the one with red color", Hispanicized spelling Huilane) is a mountain in the Andes of Peru, about 5,200 metres (17,060 ft) high . It is located in the Arequipa Region, Arequipa Province, Tarucani District, and in the Moquegua Region, General Sánchez Cerro Province, on the border of the districts Coalaque and Matalaque. Wilani lies southwest of Pukasaya, northwest of Ch'awarani and northeast of Qillqata.
