= Q'uwa Laki =

Mountain in Peru

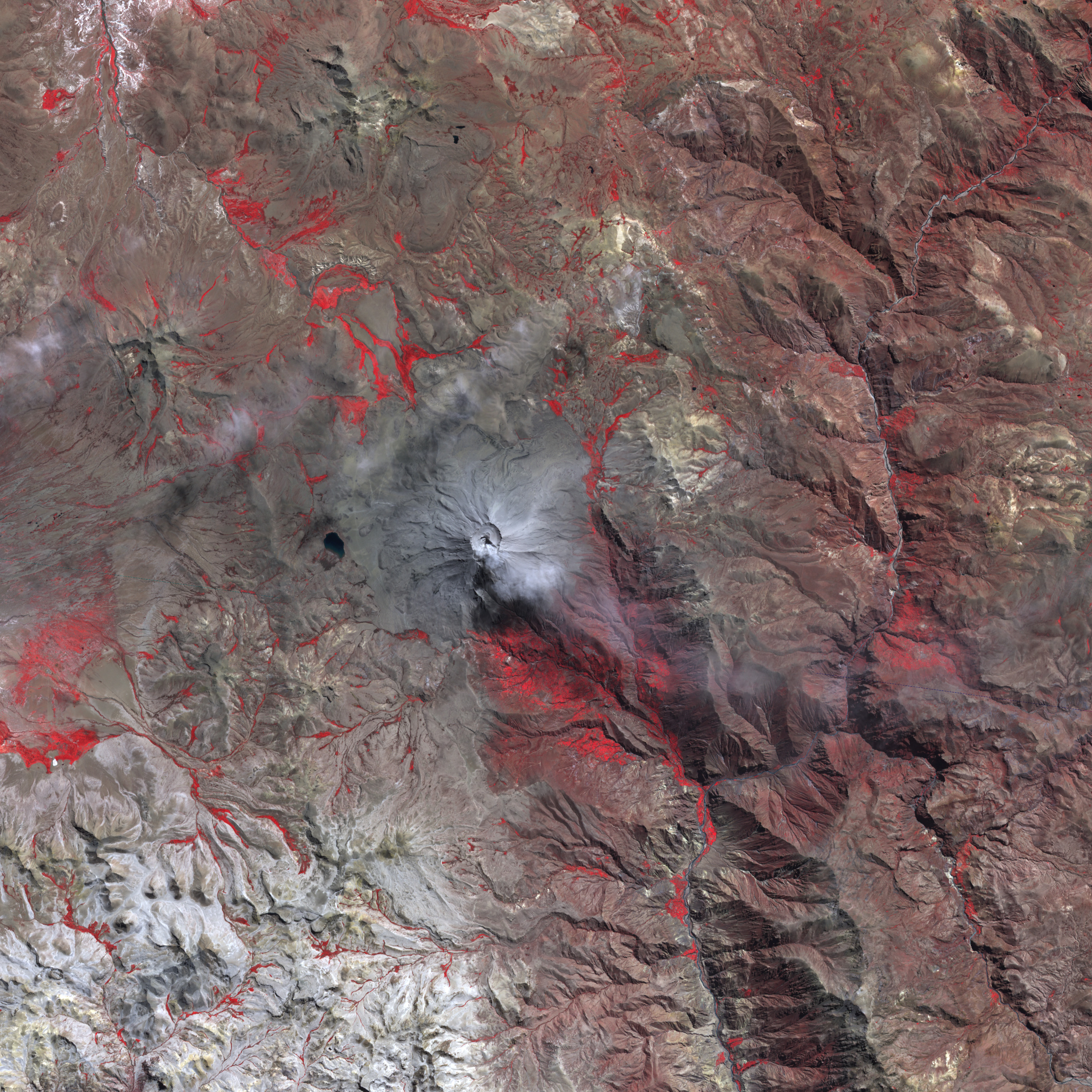
- The Ubinas volcano and Q'uwa Laki southwest of it (lower left) as seen from above (NASA, 2006)

Highest point
- Elevation: 5,200 m (17,100 ft)
- Coordinates: 16°30′47″S 70°58′07″W

Geography
- Location within Peru
- Location: Peru, Moquegua Region
- Parent range: Andes

Q'uwa Laki (Aymara q'uwa a medical plant, laki distribution; a wise person specialized in healing diseases, Hispanicized spelling Coalaque) is a mountain in the Andes of Peru, about 5,200 metres (17,060 ft) high . It is located in the Moquegua Region, General Sánchez Cerro Province, on the border of the districts Coalaque, Matalaque and Omate. Q'uwa Laki lies southeast of the peaks of Qillqata and Wilani.
