= Grindelwald Fluctuation =

Cold period during the Little Ice Age

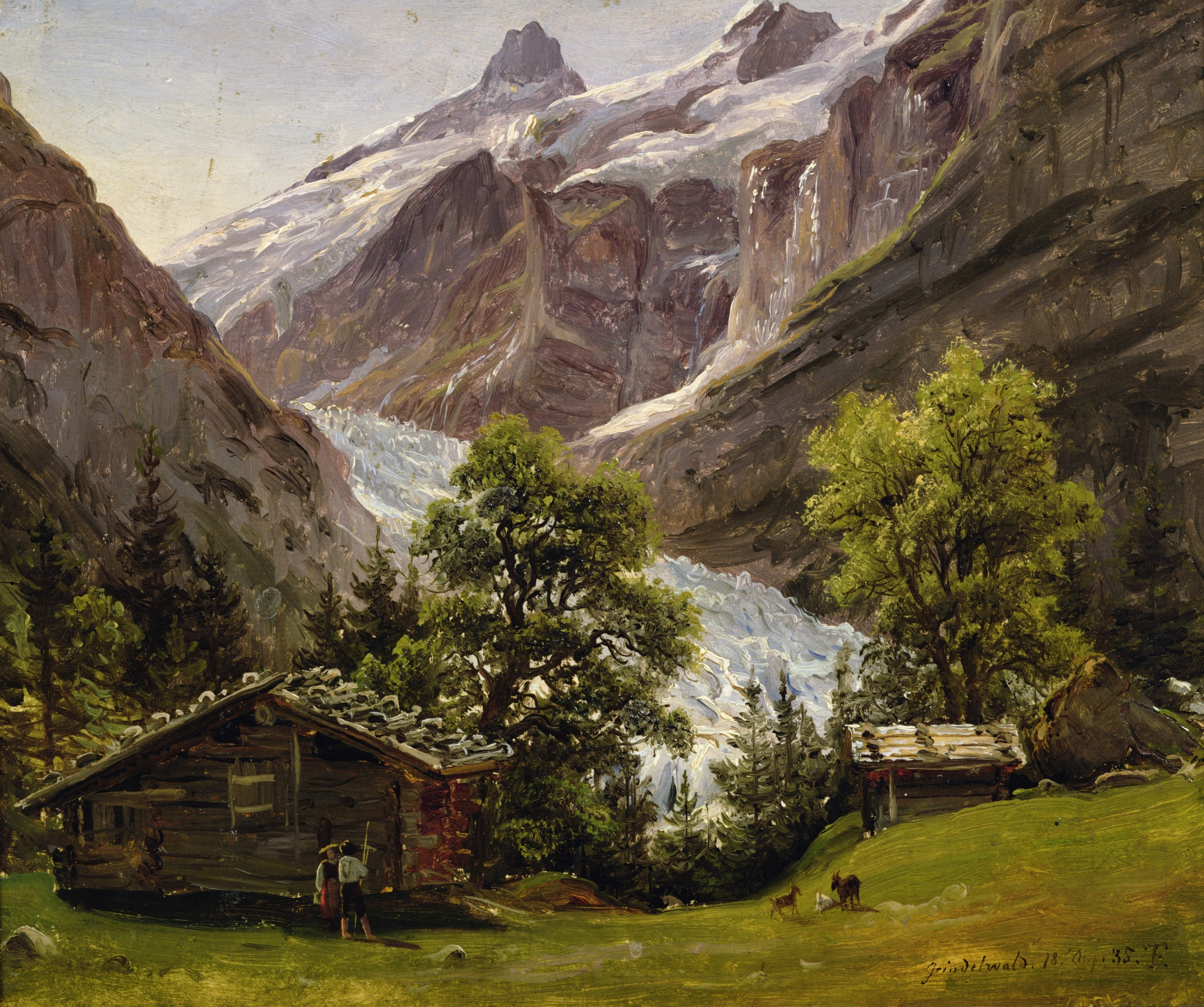
Grindelwald, Switzerland (1835) depicting Upper Grindelwald Glacier

The Grindelwald Fluctuation is a period (in a wider cooling phenomenon) when glaciers in Grindelwald, Switzerland, expanded significantly. Temperatures were 1-2 degrees Celsius lower than twentieth-century averages during this period, which is thought to have lasted from the 1560s to the 1630s.

The Grindelwald Fluctuation occurred during the Little Ice Age, a period of cooling that occurred from the 13th to the mid 19th century; characterised by the expansion of glaciers in many parts of the world, including the Alps in Europe. It produced some of the lowest temperatures known to this holocene.

== Causes ==
The expansion of the Swiss Grindelwald glaciers during this period was likely due to a combination of factors, including volcanic activity and the sudden decrease in population numbers.

=== Volcanic Events ===
The Grindelwald Fluctuation is believed to have been partially caused by a slew of volcanic eruptions.

A succession of volcanic eruptions can create a cooling effect. When a volcano erupts it releases sulphur dioxide and other aerosols into the stratosphere, which can block some of the sun's radiation from reaching the Earth's surface. Depending on the size and frequency of these eruptions, the cooling effects can last anywhere from a few years to a few decades.

In 1585, the Colima volcano in Mexico erupted. 10 years later in 1595, Nevado del Ruiz erupted. Then in 1600, five years later, the Huaynaputina volcano erupted in what is known as one of the most powerful explosions to occur in the last 2500 years. These back to back major volcanic explosions can cause long-term cooling by activating “positive feedback” in different parts of the Earth's climate system.

However it is believed that the Grindelwald Fluctuation began some 15 years prior to the first volcanic eruption.

=== Decreased Population ===
Human activities such as deforestation and land use changes are known to negatively affect local climate patterns. William Ruddiman, a palaeoclimatologist, proposed the hypothesis that human activity has been affecting the Earth's climate for much longer than previously thought. In particular, Ruddiman has argued that the early adoption of agriculture and land-use practices by human societies, beginning around 8,000 years ago, led to the release of significant amounts of greenhouse gases into the atmosphere, which may have contributed to the warming of the Earth's climate.

It is difficult to accurately assess the extent of depopulation that occurred during both the 1500s and 1600s, as reliable population data from this period is limited. However it is known that this period was one of significant upheaval and change, with many regions experiencing significant population drops due to wars, plagues, famines, and natural disasters. The bubonic plague, for instance, killed between 75 and 200 million people in Europe alone. It is also believed that an onset of disease during the Little Ice Age may have led to further depopulation. The massacre and death of indigenous populations in the Americas following the Spanish conquests may have been a major contributor, as agricultural land fell out of use and reforested.

This decline in population meant that cultivated lands became unkempt, allowing for the regrowth of wild plants. This is thought to have caused the drop in atmospheric carbon dioxide in the sixteenth century that exacerbated the extreme cooling period. However, depopulation is the least significant of the causes of the Grindelwald Fluctuation.

== Historical records ==
In historical records, the Grindelwald Fluctuation is characterised by a further drop in temperatures and more frequent cold spells throughout many parts of the world. Some of the more notable records—written by a Jacobean weather enthusiast in Bristol—chronicle the effects these changes had on Bristol and the surrounding region, including crop failures and famines, freezes and floods, and unseasonal blizzards and tempests, as well as droughts.

== See also ==
- List of glaciers in Switzerland
