= Omate District =

Coordinates: 16.6739°S 70.9701°W

Omate Umati
- District
- Interactive map of Omate
- Country: Peru
- Region: Moquegua
- Province: General Sánchez Cerro
- Capital: Omate

Government
  - Mayor: Angel Quispitupac

Area
  - Total: 250.64 km^{2} (96.77 sq mi)
- Elevation: 2,160 m (7,090 ft)

Population (2007 census)
  - Total: 3,900
  - Density: 16/km^{2} (40/sq mi)
- Time zone: UTC-5 (PET)
- UBIGEO: 180201

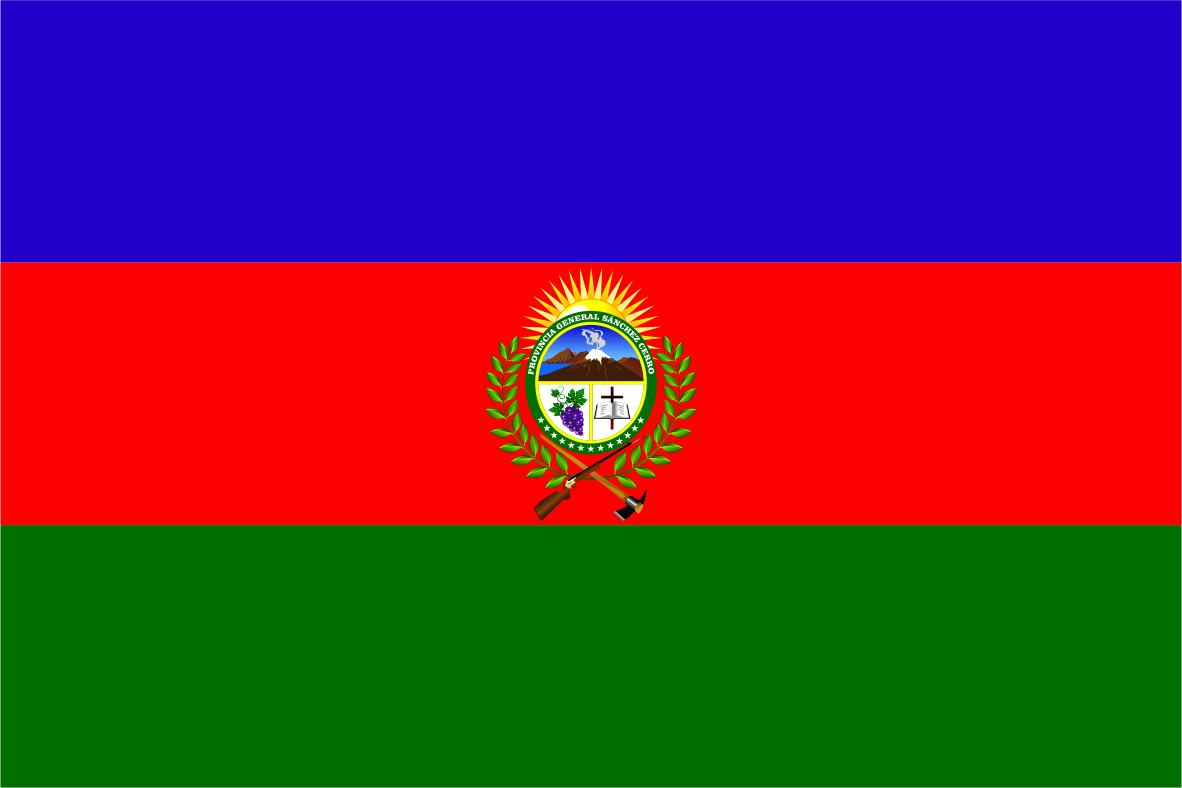
Flag of the Omate District

Omate District is one of eleven districts of the province General Sánchez Cerro in Peru.

== Climate ==
Climate data for Omate, elevation 2,130 m (6,990 ft), (1991–2020)
Month	Jan	Feb	Mar	Apr	May	Jun	Jul	Aug	Sep	Oct	Nov	Dec	Year
Mean daily maximum °C (°F)	25.1 (77.2)	24.7 (76.5)	24.9 (76.8)	25.1 (77.2)	25.1 (77.2)	24.9 (76.8)	24.8 (76.6)	25.6 (78.1)	26.2 (79.2)	26.4 (79.5)	26.6 (79.9)	26.1 (79.0)	25.5 (77.8)
Mean daily minimum °C (°F)	10.9 (51.6)	11.3 (52.3)	10.6 (51.1)	9.5 (49.1)	8.2 (46.8)	7.1 (44.8)	6.4 (43.5)	6.7 (44.1)	7.8 (46.0)	8.5 (47.3)	9.2 (48.6)	9.9 (49.8)	8.8 (47.9)
Average precipitation mm (inches)	48.5 (1.91)	63.5 (2.50)	25.8 (1.02)	3.3 (0.13)	0.4 (0.02)	0.3 (0.01)	0.5 (0.02)	0.9 (0.04)	1.0 (0.04)	0.2 (0.01)	0.5 (0.02)	8.1 (0.32)	153 (6.04)
Source: National Meteorology and Hydrology Service of Peru

== Authorities ==
=== Mayors ===
- 2011-2014: Angel Américo Quispitupac Soto, Somos Peru Party.
- 2007-2010: Mauricio José Nina Juárez.

== See also ==
- Administrative divisions of Peru
- Luis Miguel Sánchez Cerro
- Q'uwa Laki
