= Omate =

- Village
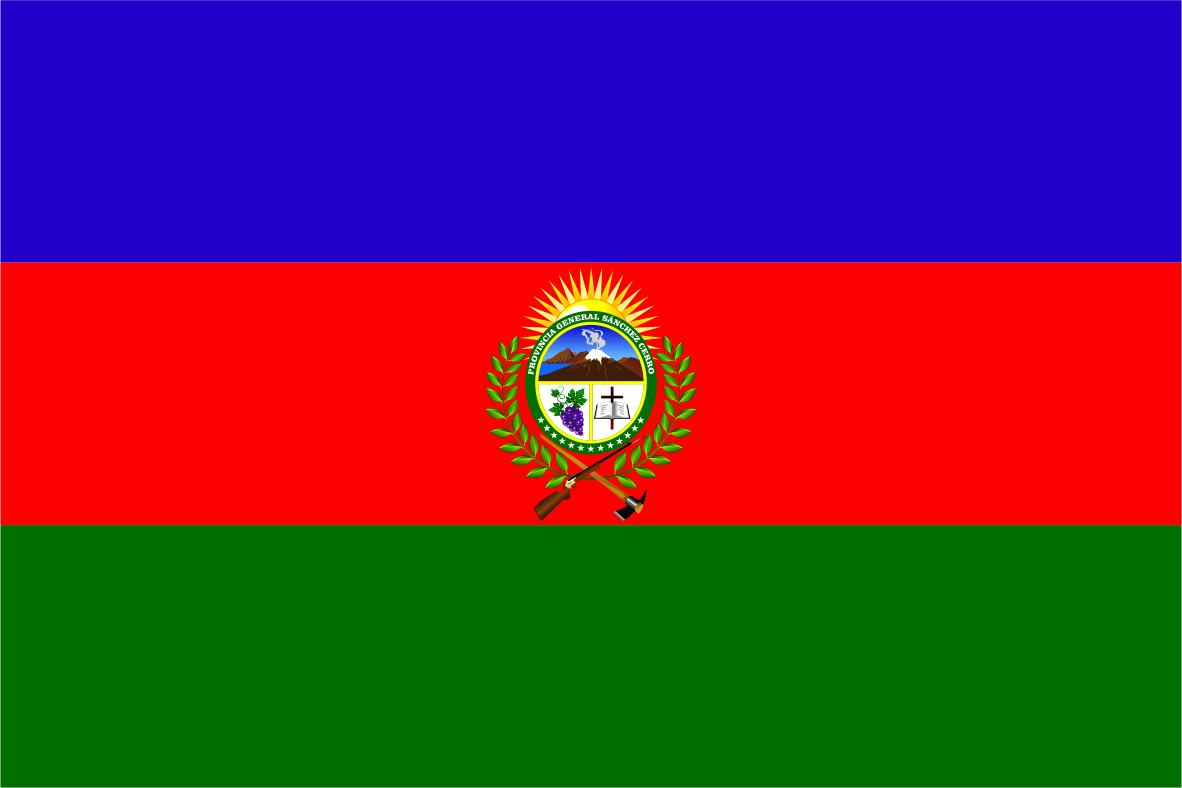
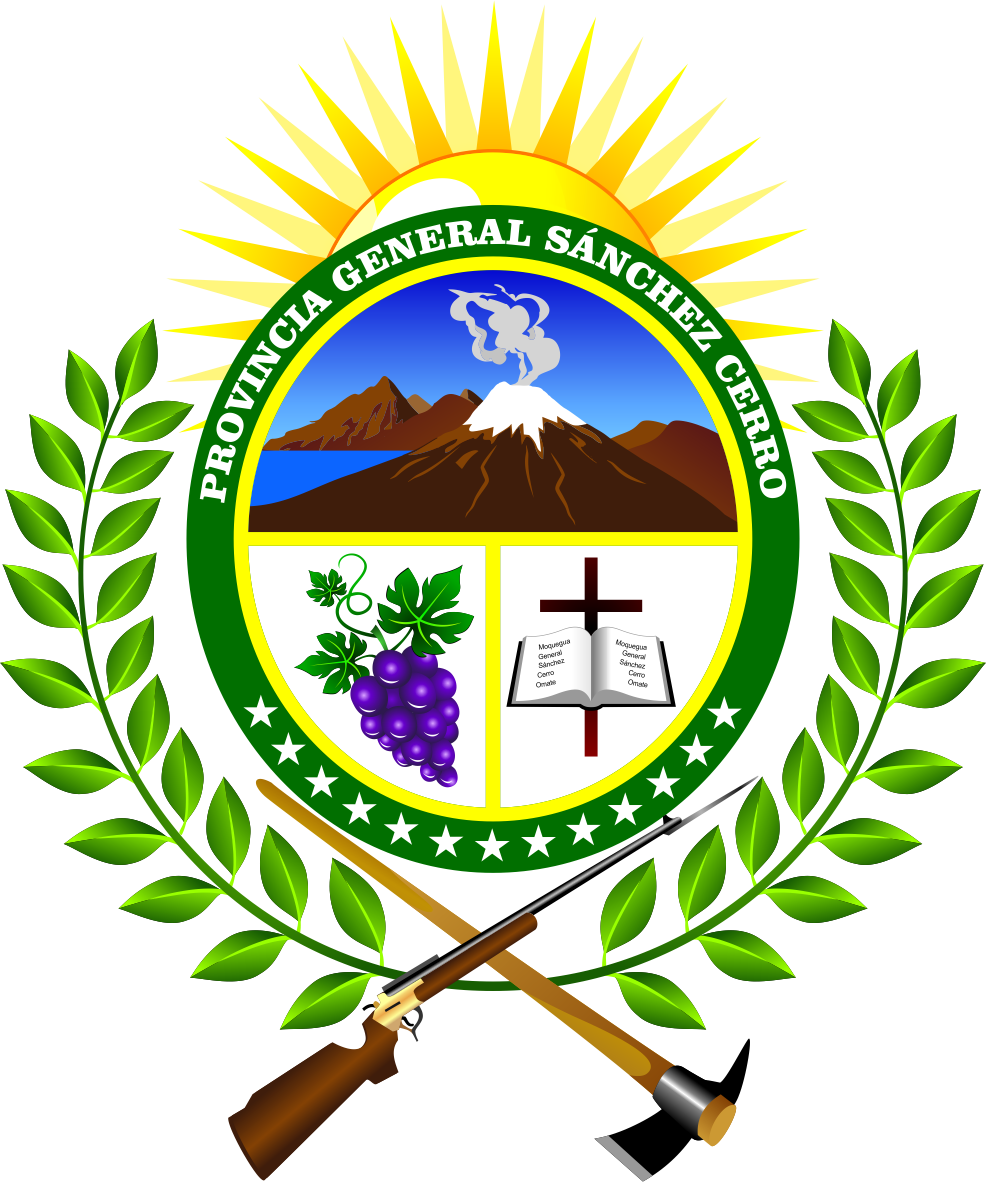
- Flag Seal

- Location within Peru
- Coordinates: 16°40′27″S 70°58′13″W
- Country: Peru
- Region: Moquegua
- Province: General Sánchez Cerro
- District: Omate

Government
  - Mayor: Mauricio Jose Nina Juarez
- Elevation: 2,166 m (7,106 ft)
- Time zone: UTC-5 (PET)

Omate is a town in Southern Peru, capital of the province General Sánchez Cerro in the region Moquegua.

== Geography ==
=== Climate ===
Climate data for Omate, elevation 2,130 m (6,990 ft), (1991–2020)
Month	Jan	Feb	Mar	Apr	May	Jun	Jul	Aug	Sep	Oct	Nov	Dec	Year
Mean daily maximum °C (°F)	25.1 (77.2)	24.7 (76.5)	24.9 (76.8)	25.1 (77.2)	25.1 (77.2)	24.9 (76.8)	24.8 (76.6)	25.6 (78.1)	26.2 (79.2)	26.4 (79.5)	26.6 (79.9)	26.1 (79.0)	25.5 (77.8)
Mean daily minimum °C (°F)	10.9 (51.6)	11.3 (52.3)	10.6 (51.1)	9.5 (49.1)	8.2 (46.8)	7.1 (44.8)	6.4 (43.5)	6.7 (44.1)	7.8 (46.0)	8.5 (47.3)	9.2 (48.6)	9.9 (49.8)	8.8 (47.9)
Average precipitation mm (inches)	48.5 (1.91)	63.5 (2.50)	25.8 (1.02)	3.3 (0.13)	0.4 (0.02)	0.3 (0.01)	0.5 (0.02)	0.9 (0.04)	1.0 (0.04)	0.2 (0.01)	0.5 (0.02)	8.1 (0.32)	153 (6.04)
Source: National Meteorology and Hydrology Service of Peru
