= Lake Salinas =

Salt lake in Peru

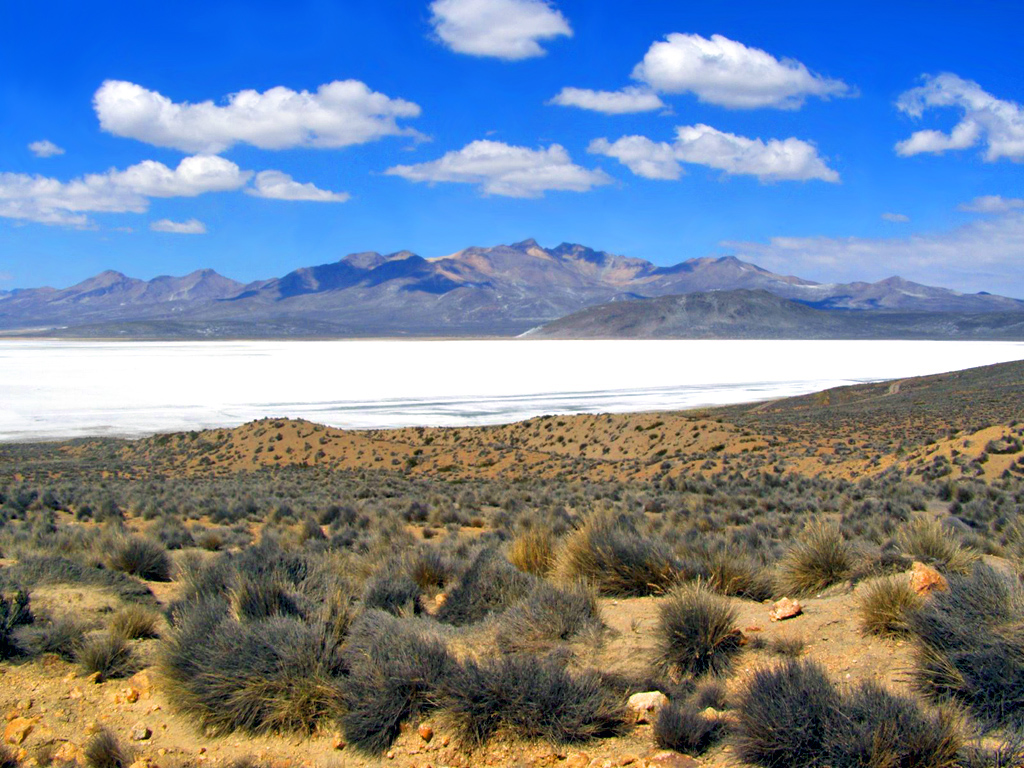

- Location within Peru
- Location: Arequipa Region, Arequipa Province
- Coordinates: 16.368056°S 71.135833°W
- Basin countries: Peru

Ramsar Wetland
- Official name: Bofedales y Laguna de Salinas
- Designated: 28 October 2003
- Reference no.: 1317

Lake Salinas is a salt lake in the Arequipa Region in Peru. It is situated in the Arequipa Province, Tarucani District.

== See also ==
- List of lakes in Peru
- Pichu Pichu
- Tacune
