= Puno province =

Coordinates: 15°50′36″S 70°01′25″W

Puno
- Province
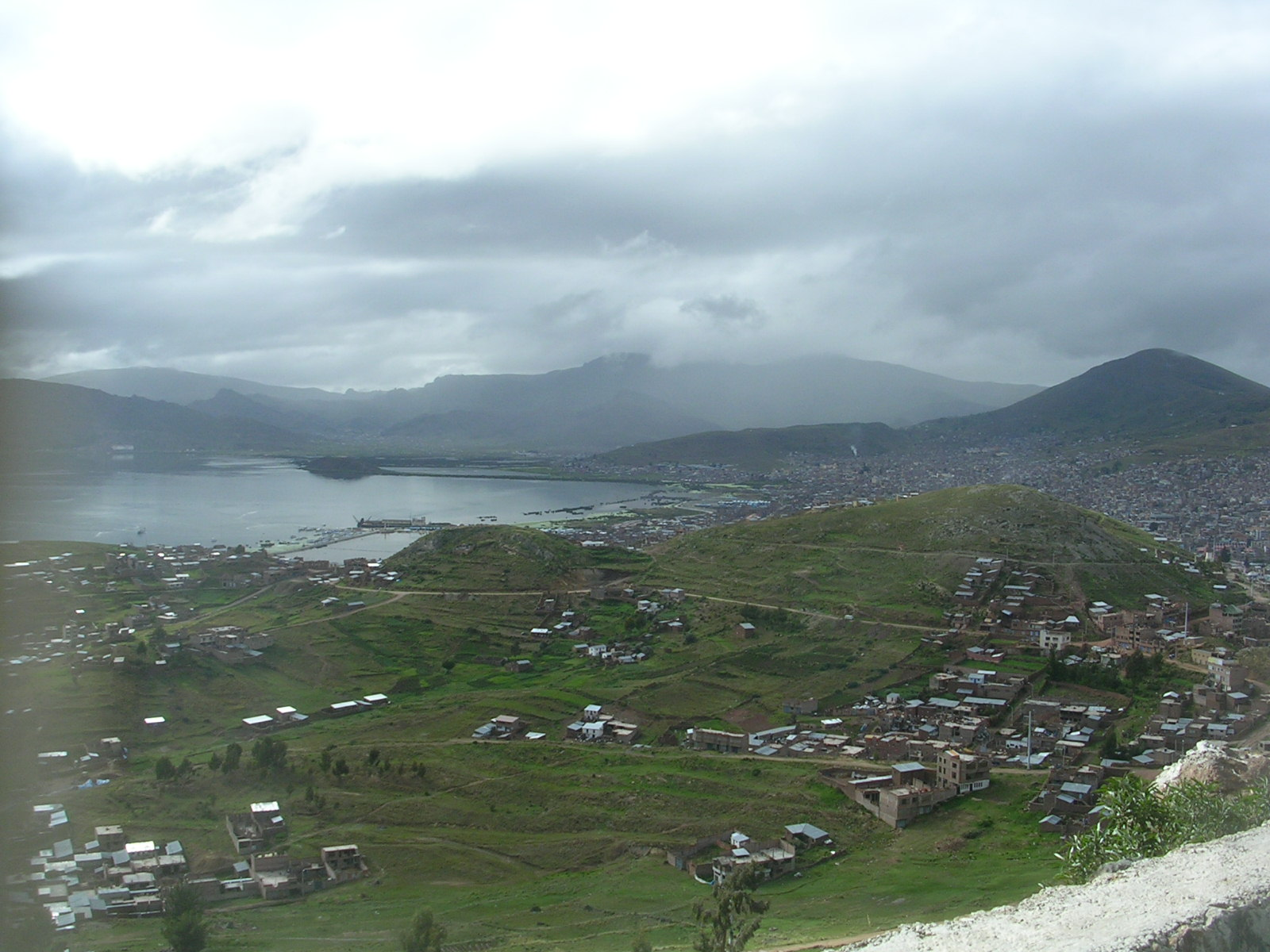
- Puno, the capital of the region, and Lake Titicaca as seen from Puma Uta viewpoint

- Flag Coat of arms

- Location of Puno in the Puno Region
- Country: Peru
- Region: Puno
- Founded: March 16, 1956
- Capital: Puno

Government
  - Mayor: Javier Ponce Roque

Area
  - Total: 6,494.76 km^{2} (2,507.64 sq mi)
- Elevation: 3,827 m (12,556 ft)

Population
  - Total: 219,494
  - Density: 33.7956/km^{2} (87.5301/sq mi)
- UBIGEO: 2101
- Website: www.munipuno.gob.pe

Puno is a province in the Puno Region, in southeastern Peru. It borders the provinces of Huancane, San Román, El Collao and the Moquegua Region's province of General Sánchez Cerro. Its capital is the city of Puno, which is located at the edge of Lake Titicaca, the world's highest navigable lake. It is the economic powerhouse of the region.

== Geography ==
Some of the highest mountains of the province are listed below:

- Allpaqani
- Anta Qayqu
- Arichuwa
- Asiruni
- Challwani
- Chuqi Liwa
- Chuqipata
- Churi Wiqu
- Chuwallani
- Ch'iyar Jaqhi
- Ch'iyar Jaqhi (Puno)
- Inka Laya
- Jach'a Phaq'u Q'awa
- Jach'a Qullu
- Janq'u Jaqhi
- Janq'u Qalani
- Janq'u Saxa
- Janq'u Saywani
- Jat'u K'achi
- Jayu Jayuni
- Jichu Qullu
- Kuntur Ikiña
- Kuntur Ikiña (Pich.)
- Kunturini
- Kunturiri
- K'ara K'arani
- Laq'a Apachita
- Llallawa
- Millu
- Mulluq'u
- Muru Jaqhi
- Nasa Parqu
- Pinkilluni
- Puka Kancha Punta
- Puka Phuju
- Pukara
- Pumamarka
- Pura Purani
- Phaq'u Apachita
- Phaq'u Q'awa
- Qachi Qullu
- Qina Qinani
- Qutuni
- Q'ara Qullu
- Q'atawi
- Q'illu Chuta
- Q'isanani
- Q'iwiri
- Qurini
- Q'ulini
- Salla Qachi
- Sirka Sirka
- Supay Laya
- Surichata
- Tankani
- Tankani (Pich.)
- Taypi Qullu
- Uturunqani
- Wallata
- Wallqani
- Wankarani
- Warawarani
- Wayllani
- Wila Kunkani
- Wila Qullu
- Wila Salla
- Wila Wila
- Wilantay
- Wilaquta
- Wiluyu (Mañ.-Tiqui.)
- Wiluyu (Tiqui.)
- Yaritani
- Yuraq Punta

== Political division ==
The province is divided into fifteen districts (Spanish: distritos, singular: distrito):

- Acora
- Amantani
- Atuncolla
- Capachica
- Chucuito
- Coata
- Huata
- Mañazo
- Paucarcolla
- Pichacani
- Plateria
- Puno
- San Antonio
- Tiquillaca
- Vilque

== Ethnic groups ==
The province is inhabited by indigenous citizens of Aymara and Quechua descent. Spanish is the language which the majority of the population (45.40%) learnt to speak in childhood, 27.67% of the residents started speaking using the Quechua language and 26.50% using Aymara (2007 Peru Census).

== See also ==
- Amantani
- Esteves (island)
- Hatunqucha
- Inka Tunuwiri
- Inka Uyu
- Jaravi
- Mayqu Amaya
- Q'axilu
- Q'inq'u
- Taquile Island
- Tikunata
- Uros
