= Amantaní District =

Coordinates: 15°39′51″S 69°42′36″W

Amantaní
- District
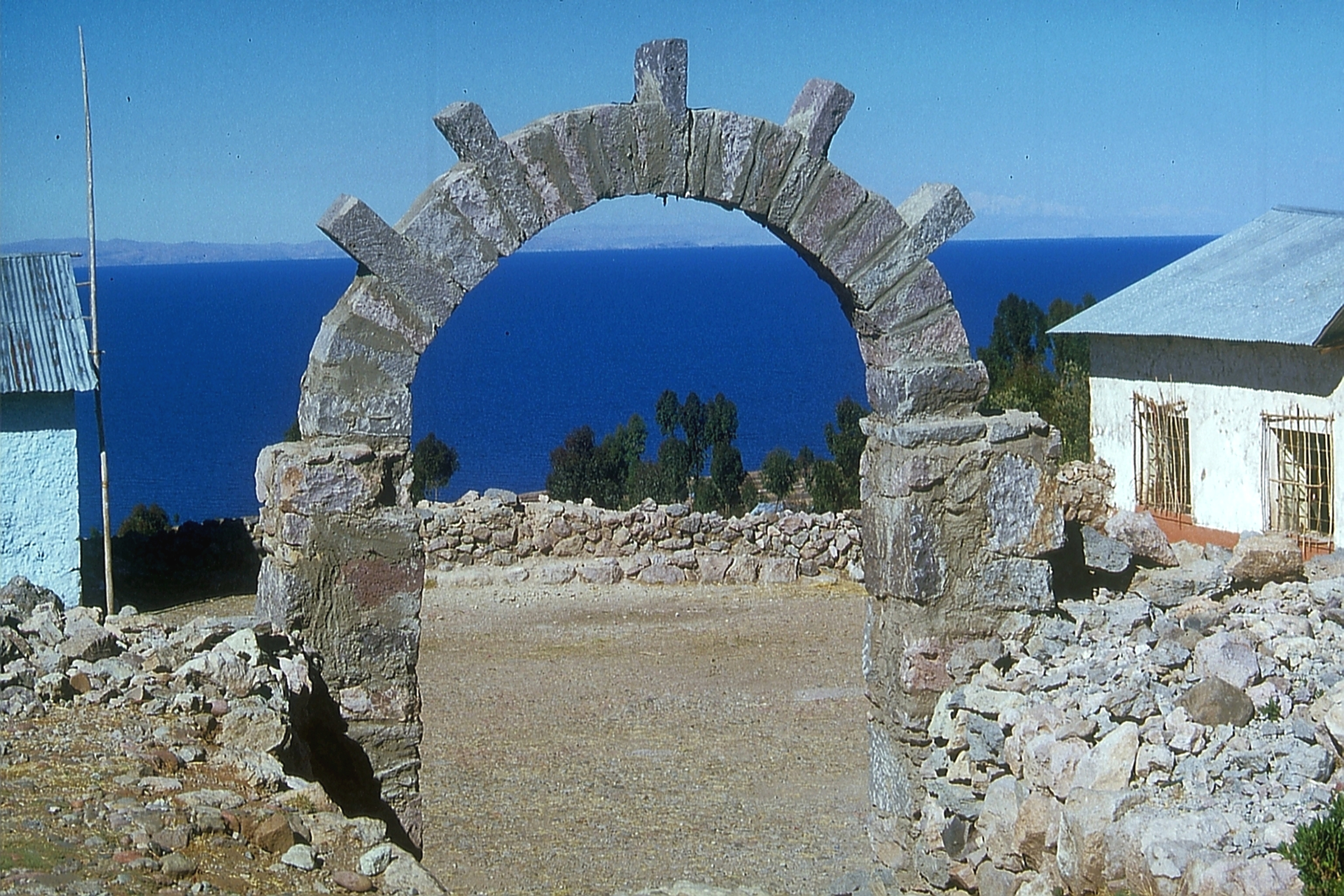
- Amantaní
- Interactive map of Amantaní
- Country: Peru
- Region: Puno
- Province: Puno
- Founded: April 9, 1965
- Capital: Amantaní

Government
  - Mayor: Marcelino Yucra

Area
  - Total: 15 km^{2} (5.8 sq mi)
- Elevation: 3,854 m (12,644 ft)

Population (2007 census)
  - Total: 4,255
  - Density: 280/km^{2} (730/sq mi)
- Time zone: UTC-5 (PET)
- UBIGEO: 210102
- Website: muniamantani.gob.pe

Amantaní is one of fifteen districts of the Puno Province in the Puno region, Peru.

== History ==
Amantaní District was created by law on April 9, 1965, in Fernando Belaúnde's term.

== Ethnic groups ==
The people in the district are mainly indigenous citizens of Quechua descent. Quechua is the language which the majority of the population (95.28%) learnt to speak in childhood, 1.50% of the residents started speaking using the Spanish language (2007 Peru Census).

== Climate ==
Climate data for Isla Taquile, elevation 3,837 m (12,589 ft), (1991–2020)
| Month | Jan | Feb | Mar | Apr | May | Jun | Jul | Aug | Sep | Oct | Nov | Dec | Year |
|---|---|---|---|---|---|---|---|---|---|---|---|---|---|
| Mean daily maximum °C (°F) | 15.9 (60.6) | 15.9 (60.6) | 15.6 (60.1) | 15.7 (60.3) | 15.2 (59.4) | 14.5 (58.1) | 14.2 (57.6) | 14.9 (58.8) | 15.8 (60.4) | 17.0 (62.6) | 17.7 (63.9) | 17.2 (63.0) | 15.8 (60.5) |
| Mean daily minimum °C (°F) | 6.3 (43.3) | 6.4 (43.5) | 6.4 (43.5) | 6.2 (43.2) | 5.1 (41.2) | 4.0 (39.2) | 3.4 (38.1) | 3.9 (39.0) | 5.0 (41.0) | 5.9 (42.6) | 6.7 (44.1) | 6.7 (44.1) | 5.5 (41.9) |
| Average precipitation mm (inches) | 215.9 (8.50) | 205.5 (8.09) | 174.3 (6.86) | 66.8 (2.63) | 12.8 (0.50) | 6.6 (0.26) | 10.2 (0.40) | 12.8 (0.50) | 33.9 (1.33) | 47.6 (1.87) | 54.6 (2.15) | 112.6 (4.43) | 953.6 (37.52) |
Source: National Meteorology and Hydrology Service of Peru

== Mayors ==
- 2011-2014: Marcelino Yucra Pacompia.
- 2007-2010: Adrián Severo Yanarico Cari.

== Festivities ==
- Our Lady of Candles.

== See also ==
- Amantani
