= Huata District, Puno =

Coordinates: 15.6226°S 70.0538°W

Huata District
- District
- Iglesia de Huata in Huata
- Interactive map of Huata District
- Country: Peru
- Region: Puno
- Province: Puno
- Founded: August 22, 1921
- Capital: Huata

Government
  - Mayor: Pedro Curo Huanca

Area
  - Total: 130.37 km^{2} (50.34 sq mi)
- Elevation: 3,848 m (12,625 ft)

Population (2005 census)
  - Total: 3,393
  - Density: 26.03/km^{2} (67.41/sq mi)
- Time zone: UTC-5 (PET)
- UBIGEO: 210108

Huata District is one of fifteen districts of the province Puno in Peru.

== Ethnic groups ==
The people in the district are mainly indigenous citizens of Quechua descent. Quechua is the language which the majority of the population (78.97%) learnt to speak in childhood, 15.10% of the residents started speaking using the Spanish language (2007 Peru Census).
