= Esteves (island) =

Island in Peru

Coordinates: 15.8272°S 70.0100°W

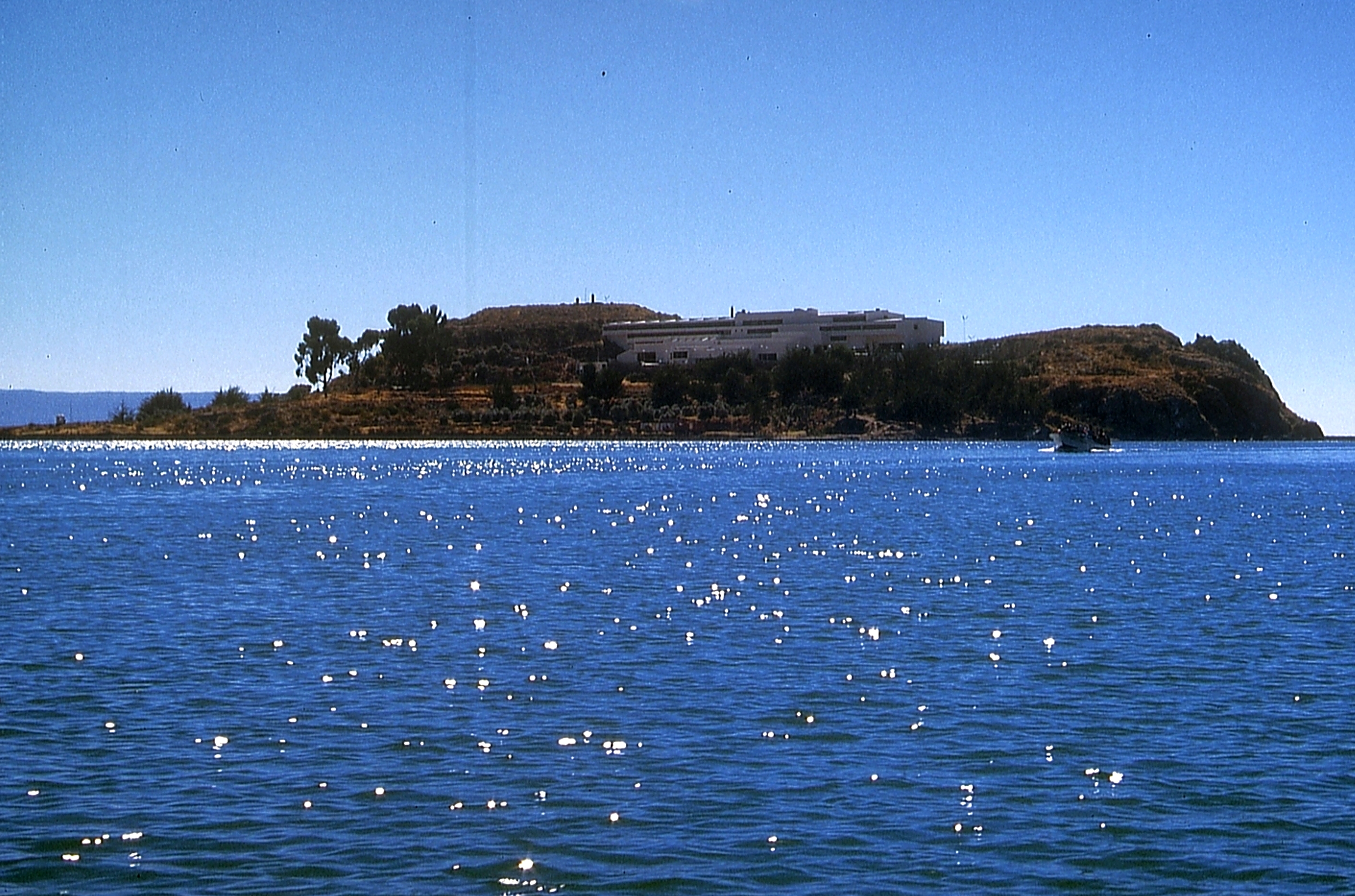
Esteves Island, Lake Titicaca, Peru

Esteves (Spanish: Isla Esteves) is an island in the Peruvian part of Lake Titicaca near the city of Puno in Puno Province, Puno Department. The Island has only one road, Sesquicentenario, but has a dirt road that encircles the island, as well as two helicopter landings.

Esteves Island also has a hotel, the Hotel Libertador Lake Titicaca Puno. The hotel has a private pier from which guests may travel to other Lake Titicaca islands.
