= Coata District =

Coordinates: 15.5773°S 70.0267°W

Coata
- District
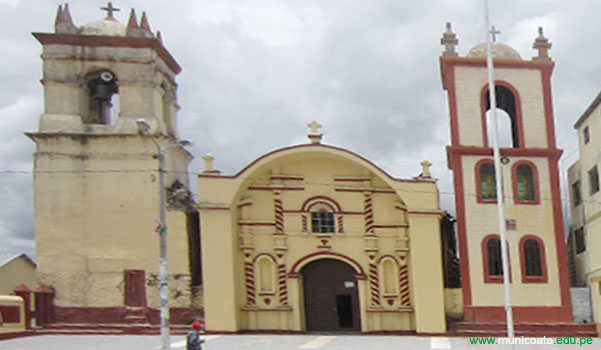
- Interactive map of Coata
- Country: Peru
- Region: Puno
- Province: Puno
- Capital: Coata

Government
  - Mayor: Escolastico Mamani Canaza

Area
  - Total: 104 km^{2} (40 sq mi)
- Elevation: 3,814 m (12,513 ft)

Population (2005 census)
  - Total: 6,994
  - Density: 67.2/km^{2} (174/sq mi)
- Time zone: UTC-5 (PET)
- UBIGEO: 210107

Coata District is one of fifteen districts of the province Puno in Peru.

== Ethnic groups ==
The people in the district are mainly indigenous citizens of Quechua descent. Quechua is the language which the majority of the population (96.12%) learnt to speak in childhood, 3.37% of the residents started speaking using the Spanish language (2007 Peru Census).
