= Wiluyu (Tiquillaca) =

Mountain in Peru

- Location within Peru

Highest point
- Elevation: 4,600 m (15,100 ft)
- Coordinates: 16°02′40″S 70°23′03″W

Geography
- Location: Peru, Puno Region
- Parent range: Andes

Wiluyu (Aymara wila blood, blood-red, uyu corral, "red corral", Hispanicized spelling Veluyo) is a mountain in the Andes of southern Peru, about 4,600 metres (15,092 ft) high. It is located in the Puno Region, Puno Province, Tiquillaca District. It lies between two rivers named Wanuni (Huanuni) and Uqi Jaqhi (Oqueaque), southwest of the mountain K'ara K'arani and southeast of Pura Purani.
