= Ticonata Island =

Island in Peru

Coordinates: 15°38′54.5″S 69°47′15.8″W

Ticonata
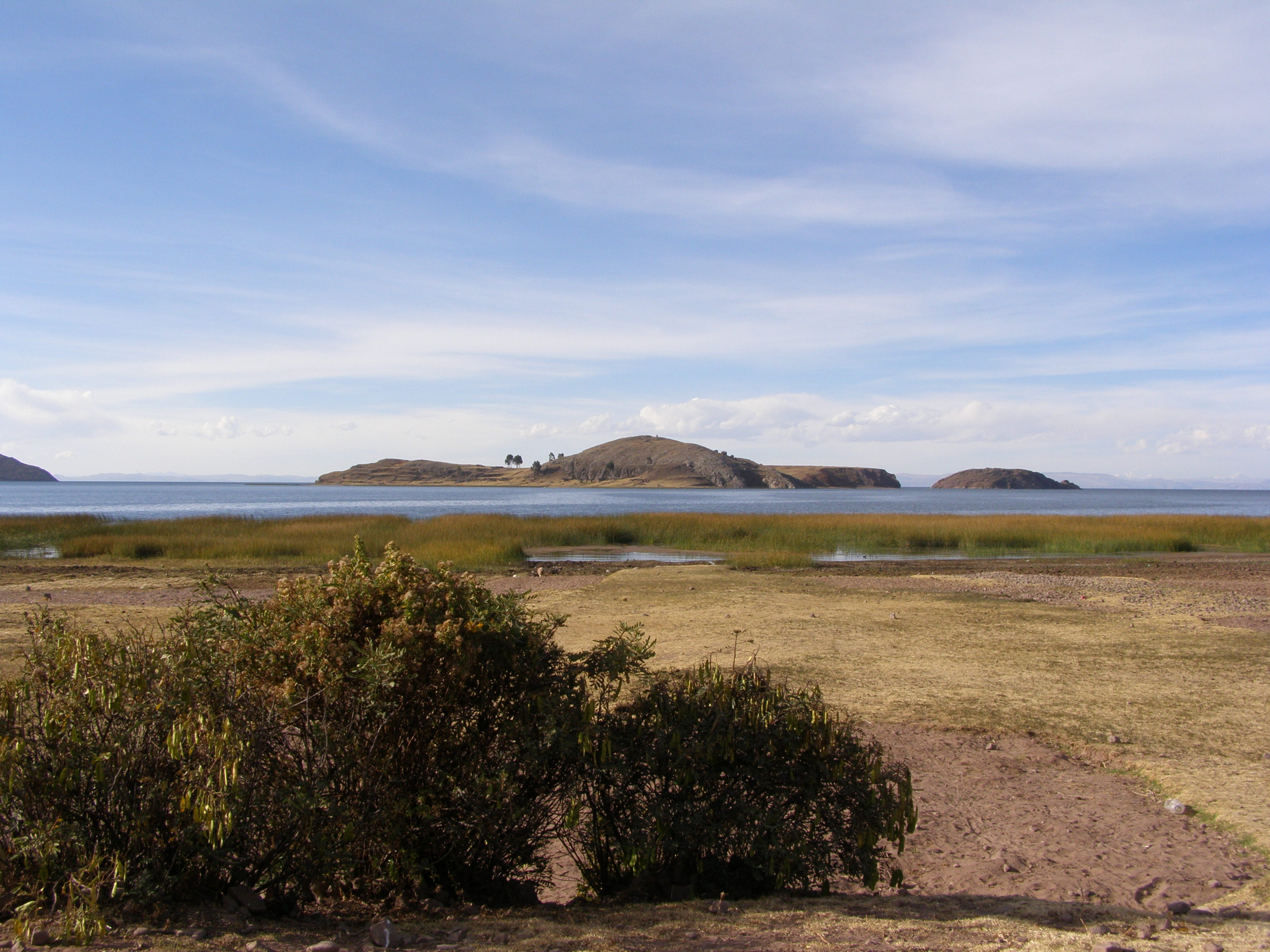
- The island Ticonata and Lake Titicaca as seen from Ccotos, Capachica
- Interactive map of Ticonata

Geography
- Location: Lake Titicaca, Puno Region

Administration
- Peru

Ticonata or Tikonata (possibly from Aymara tikuna a kind of worm or caterpillar, -ta a suffix, "from") is an island on the Peruvian side of Lake Titicaca. It is located in the Puno Region, Puno Province, Capachica District, between the peninsula Capachica in the east and the island Amantani in the west.
