= Wila Wila (Peru) =

Mountain in Peru

- Location within Peru

Highest point
- Elevation: 4,925 m (16,158 ft)
- Coordinates: 15°57′33″S 70°25′31″W

Geography
- Location: Peru, Puno Region, Puno Province
- Parent range: Andes

Wila Wila (Aymara wila blood, blood-red, the reduplication indicates that there is a group or a complex of something, "a complex of red color", Hispanicized spelling Vilavila) is a mountain in the Andes of Peru, about 4,925 metres (16,158 ft) high. It is situated in the Puno Region, Puno Province, on the border of the districts Mañazo and Tiquillaca. Wila Wila lies between the lake Mayasani in the west and the river Wanuni (Huanune) in the east.
