= Mañazo District =

Coordinates: 15.8010°S 70.3480°W

Mañazo Mañasu
- District
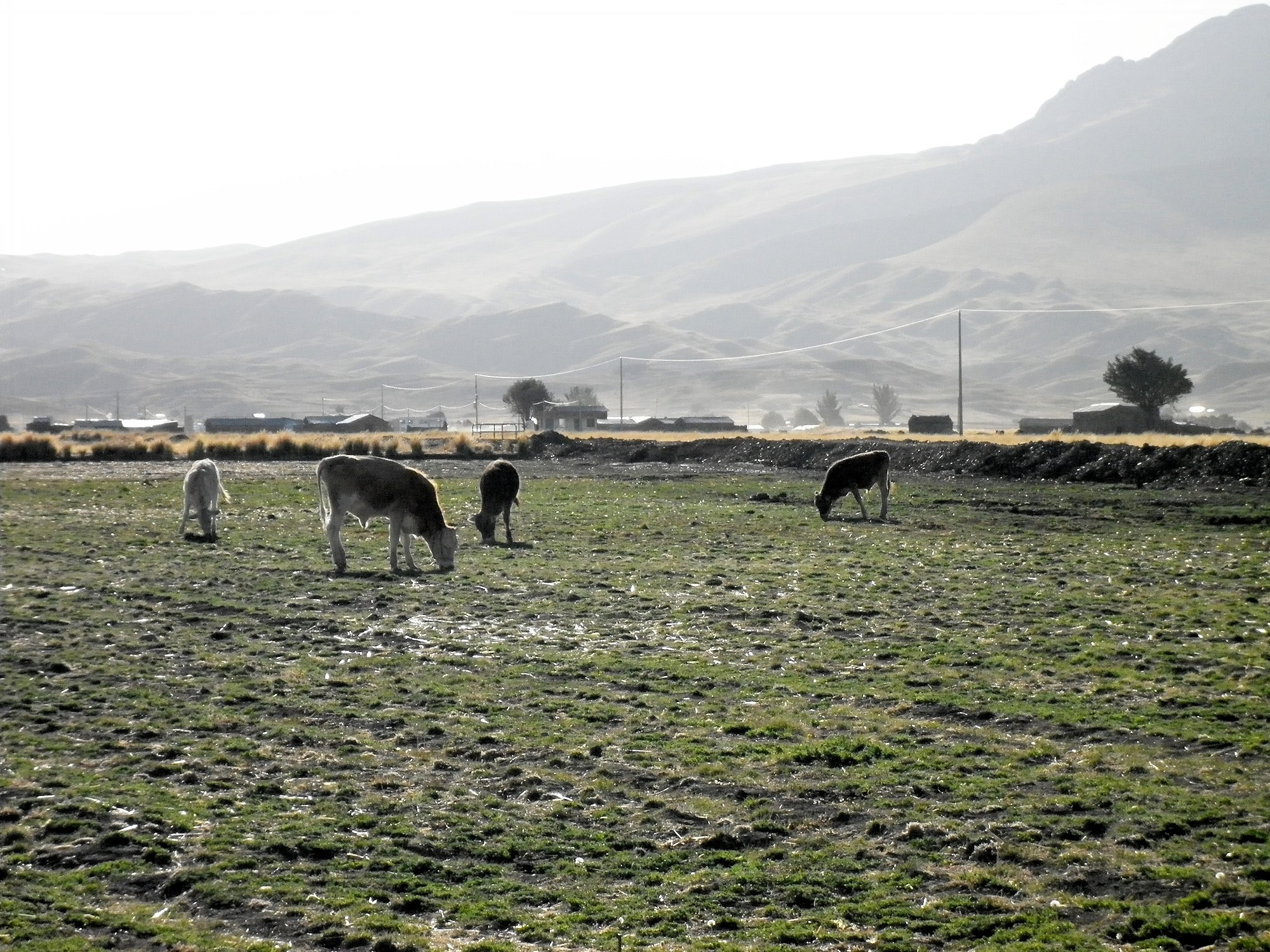
- Cows on a meadow in Mañazo District
- Interactive map of Mañazo
- Country: Peru
- Region: Puno
- Province: Puno
- Founded: January 30, 1953
- Capital: Mañazo

Government
  - Mayor: Miguel Gabriel Quispe Achata

Area
  - Total: 410.67 km^{2} (158.56 sq mi)
- Elevation: 3,926 m (12,881 ft)

Population (2005 census)
  - Total: 5,537
  - Density: 13.48/km^{2} (34.92/sq mi)
- Time zone: UTC-5 (PET)
- UBIGEO: 210109

Mañazo (Aymara Mañasu, meaning butcher) is one of fifteen districts of the province Puno in Peru.

== Ethnic groups ==
The people in the district are mainly indigenous citizens of Quechua descent. Quechua is the language which the majority of the population (63.59%) learnt to speak in childhood, 35.92% of the residents started speaking using the Spanish language (2007 Peru Census).

== Climate ==
Climate data for Mañazo, elevation 3,931 m (12,897 ft), (1991–2020)
Month	Jan	Feb	Mar	Apr	May	Jun	Jul	Aug	Sep	Oct	Nov	Dec	Year
Mean daily maximum °C (°F)	16.0 (60.8)	15.6 (60.1)	15.8 (60.4)	16.2 (61.2)	16.4 (61.5)	15.9 (60.6)	15.8 (60.4)	16.7 (62.1)	17.6 (63.7)	18.2 (64.8)	18.7 (65.7)	17.6 (63.7)	16.7 (62.1)
Mean daily minimum °C (°F)	4.3 (39.7)	4.4 (39.9)	3.6 (38.5)	1.8 (35.2)	−0.6 (30.9)	−2.4 (27.7)	−2.8 (27.0)	−1.8 (28.8)	0.1 (32.2)	1.9 (35.4)	2.9 (37.2)	3.9 (39.0)	1.3 (34.3)
Average precipitation mm (inches)	135.6 (5.34)	134.0 (5.28)	91.2 (3.59)	45.6 (1.80)	5.0 (0.20)	2.0 (0.08)	3.0 (0.12)	5.3 (0.21)	15.1 (0.59)	32.1 (1.26)	48.8 (1.92)	97.9 (3.85)	615.6 (24.24)
Source: National Meteorology and Hydrology Service of Peru

== See also ==
- Kuntur Ikiña
- Wila Wila
- Wiluyu
