= K'ara K'arani =

Mountain in Peru

- Location within Peru

Highest point
- Elevation: 4,600 m (15,100 ft)
- Coordinates: 16°01′25″S 70°22′34″W

Geography
- Location: Peru, Puno Region
- Parent range: Andes

K'ara K'arani (Aymara k'ara k'ara crest, -ni a suffix to indicate ownership, "the one with a crest", Hispanicized spelling Caracarane) is a mountain in the Andes of southern Peru, about 4,600 metres (15,092 ft) high. It is located in the Puno Region, Puno Province, Tiquillaca District. K'ara K'arani lies between two rivers named Wanuni (Huanuni) and Uqi Jaqhi (Oqueaque). It is situated northeast of the mountains Pura Purani and Wiluyu.
