= Kuntur Ikiña (Puno) =

Mountain in Peru

- Location within Peru

Highest point
- Elevation: 4,800.9 m (15,751 ft)
- Coordinates: 15°52′27″S 70°18′55″W

Geography
- Location: Peru, Puno Region, Puno Province
- Parent range: Andes

Kuntur Ikiña (Aymara kunturi condor, ikiña to sleep, bed or blanket, Hispanicized spelling Condoriquiña) is a mountain in the Andes of Peru, about 4,800.9 metres (15,751 ft) high. It is located in the Puno Region, Puno Province, on the border of the districts Mañazo and Tiquillaca.
