= Plateria District =

Coordinates: 15.9494°S 69.8371°W

Platería
- District
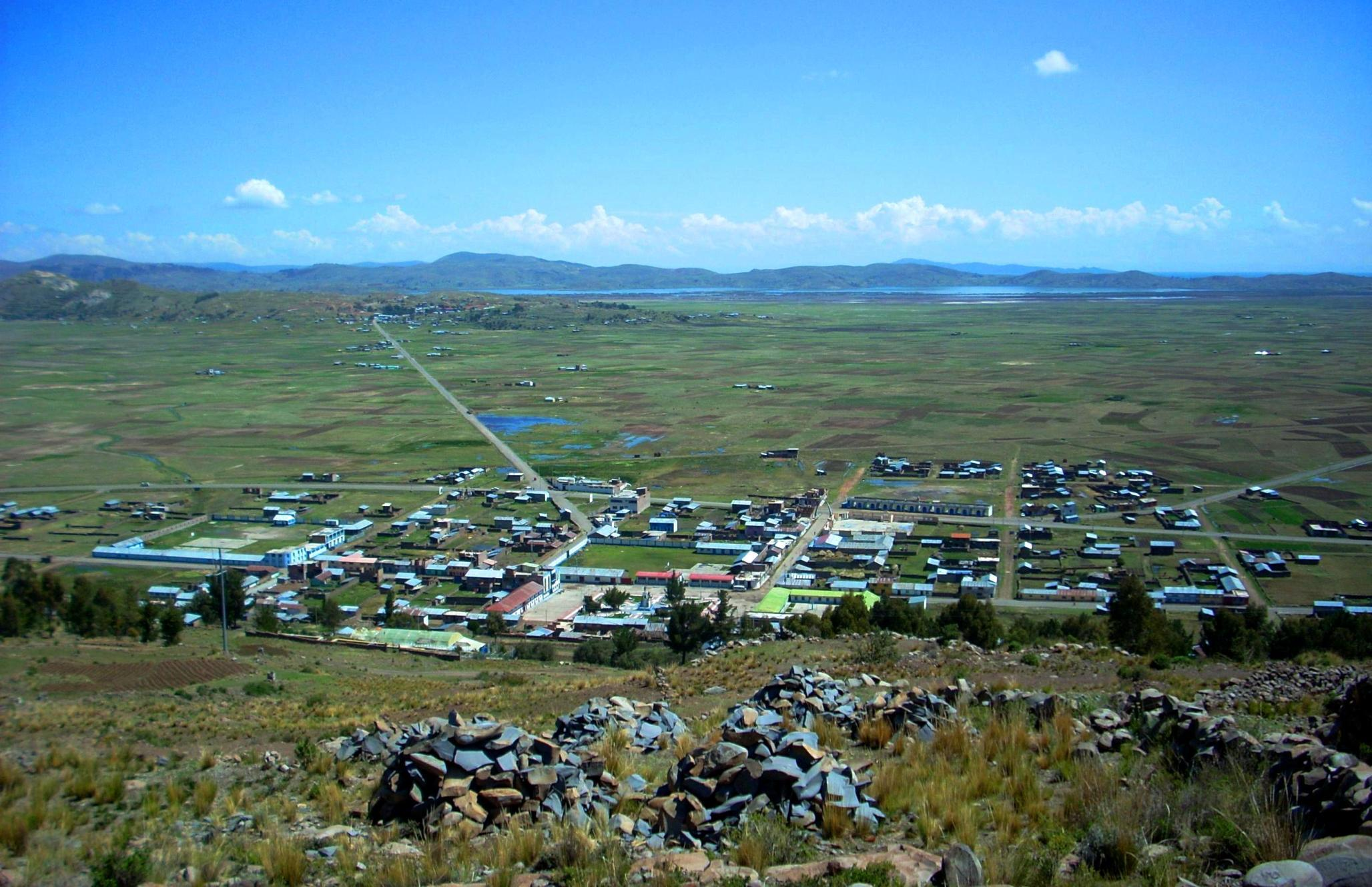
- Platería and Lake Titicaca
- Interactive map of Platería
- Country: Peru
- Region: Puno
- Province: Puno
- Founded: April 25, 1964
- Capital: Plateria

Government
  - Mayor: David Sosa Mamani

Area
  - Total: 240.63 km^{2} (92.91 sq mi)
- Elevation: 3,830 m (12,570 ft)

Population (2005 census)
  - Total: 8,835
  - Density: 36.72/km^{2} (95.09/sq mi)
- Time zone: UTC-5 (PET)
- UBIGEO: 210112

Platería District is one of fifteen districts of the province Puno in Peru.

== Ethnic groups ==
The people in the district are mainly indigenous citizens of Aymara descent. Aymara is the language which the majority of the population (79.17%) learnt to speak in childhood, 19.64% of the residents started speaking using the Spanish language (2007 Peru Census).
