= Jaravi =

Coordinates: 16°23′S 69°12′W

Jaravi is a city in Puno Province in southeastern Peru. Jaravi is close to Lake Titicaca. Jaravi is at an altitude of 12972 feet.
