= Capachica District =

Coordinates: 15.6394°S 69.9768°W

Capachica Qapachiqa
- District
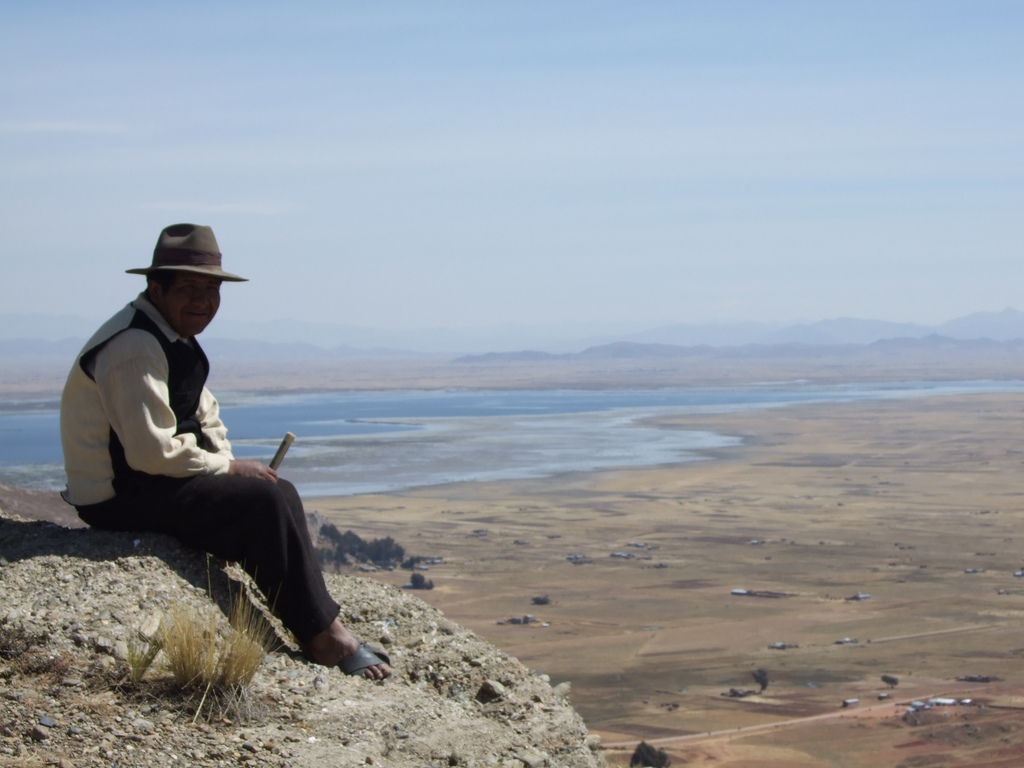
- Capachica peninsula
- Interactive map of Capachica
- Country: Peru
- Region: Puno
- Province: Puno
- Capital: Capachica

Government
  - Mayor: Ascencion Laquise Humpire

Area
  - Total: 117.06 km^{2} (45.20 sq mi)
- Elevation: 3,860 m (12,660 ft)

Population (2005 census)
  - Total: 10,320
  - Density: 88.16/km^{2} (228.3/sq mi)
- Time zone: UTC-5 (PET)
- UBIGEO: 210105

Capachica District is one of fifteen districts of the province Puno in Peru. Its seat is Capachica.

== Ethnic groups ==
The people in the district are mainly indigenous citizens of Quechua descent. Quechua is the language which the majority of the population (87.17%) learnt to speak in childhood, 12.37% of the residents started speaking using the Spanish language according to a 2007 Peru Census.

== Climate ==
Climate data for Capachica, elevation 3,822 m (12,539 ft), (1991–2020)
Month	Jan	Feb	Mar	Apr	May	Jun	Jul	Aug	Sep	Oct	Nov	Dec	Year
Mean daily maximum °C (°F)	14.6 (58.3)	14.5 (58.1)	14.7 (58.5)	14.9 (58.8)	14.7 (58.5)	14.1 (57.4)	14.0 (57.2)	14.6 (58.3)	15.3 (59.5)	15.8 (60.4)	16.2 (61.2)	15.6 (60.1)	14.9 (58.9)
Mean daily minimum °C (°F)	5.0 (41.0)	5.0 (41.0)	4.5 (40.1)	2.6 (36.7)	−1.0 (30.2)	−3.2 (26.2)	−3.3 (26.1)	−2.1 (28.2)	0.3 (32.5)	2.3 (36.1)	3.2 (37.8)	4.2 (39.6)	1.5 (34.6)
Average precipitation mm (inches)	170.6 (6.72)	162.7 (6.41)	134.0 (5.28)	47.1 (1.85)	6.6 (0.26)	3.5 (0.14)	4.5 (0.18)	12.5 (0.49)	25.9 (1.02)	44.5 (1.75)	47.9 (1.89)	105.1 (4.14)	764.9 (30.13)
Source: National Meteorology and Hydrology Service of Peru

== See also ==
- Tikunata
