= Tiquillaca District =

Coordinates: 15.7974°S 70.1895°W

Tiquillaca
- District
- Interactive map of Tiquillaca
- Country: Peru
- Region: Puno
- Province: Puno
- Capital: Tiquillaca

Government
  - Mayor: Yone Walter Villasante Apaza

Area
  - Total: 455.71 km^{2} (175.95 sq mi)
- Elevation: 3,885 m (12,746 ft)

Population (2005 census)
  - Total: 2,019
  - Density: 4.430/km^{2} (11.47/sq mi)
- Time zone: UTC-5 (PET)
- UBIGEO: 210114

Tiquillaca District is one of fifteen districts of the province Puno in Peru.

== Geography ==
Some of the highest mountains of the district are listed below:

- Allpaqani
- Asiruni
- Challwani
- Chuqi Liwa
- Chuwallani
- Inka Laya
- Jayu Jayuni
- Jichu Qullu
- Kuntur Ikiña
- K'ara K'arani
- Llallawa
- Puka Kancha Punta
- Puka Phuju
- Pukara
- Pura Purani
- Q'atawi
- Supay Laya
- Uturunqani
- Wila Salla
- Wila Wila
- Wilantay
- Wiluyu (Mañazo-Tiquillaca)
- Wiluyu (Tiquillaca)
- Yaritani
- Yuraq Punta

== Ethnic groups ==
The people in the district are mainly indigenous citizens of Quechua descent. Quechua is the language which the majority of the population (79.22%) learnt to speak in childhood, 18.42% of the residents started speaking using the Spanish language (2007 Peru Census).
