= Wiluyu (Mañazo-Tiquillaca) =

Mountain in Peru

- Location within Peru

Highest point
- Elevation: 4,800 m (15,700 ft)
- Coordinates: 15°55′09″S 70°21′52″W

Geography
- Location: Peru, Puno Region
- Parent range: Andes

Wiluyu (Aymara wila blood, blood-red, uyu corral, "red corral", Hispanicized spelling Viluyo) is a mountain in the Andes of southern Peru, about 4,800 metres (15,748 ft) high. It is located in the Puno Region, Puno Province, on the border of the districts Mañazo and Tiquillaca. It lies south of the mountain Chuqi Liwa (Choquelihua).

The Wanuni River originates near the mountain. It flows to the Uturunqani River in the south.
