= Taquile Island =

Island in Peru

Coordinates: 15°46′38″S 69°41′03″W

Taquile
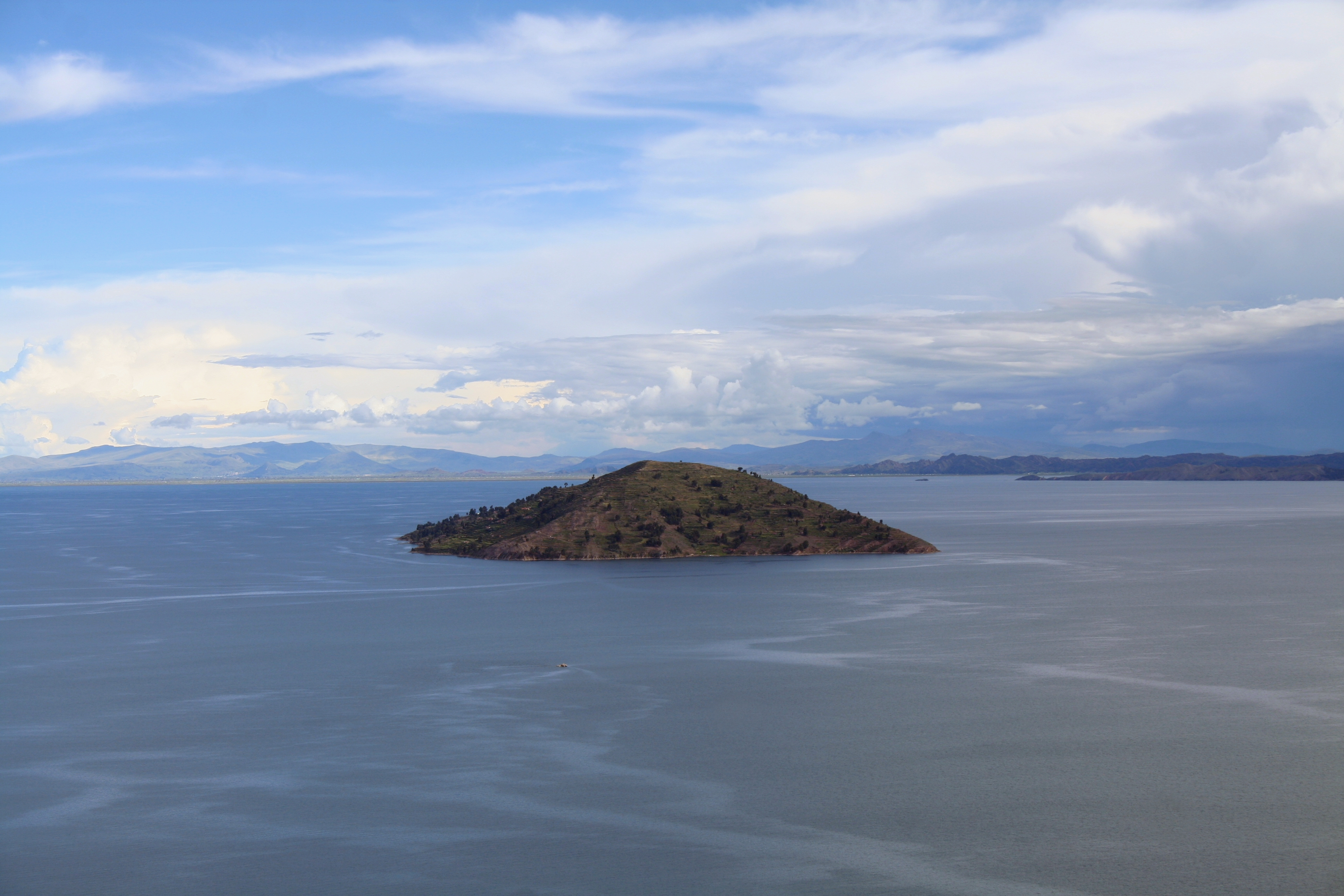
- Taquile from Amantaní island

- Location within Peru

Geography
- Location: Lake Titicaca
- Area: 5.72 km^{2} (2.21 sq mi)
- Highest point: 4.050

Administration
- Peru

Demographics
- Demonym: Taquileño
- Population: about 2200
- Ethnic groups: Quechua

Taquile (Spanish: Isla de Taquile, pronounced [ˈisla ðe taˈkile]; Quechua: Intika) is an island on the Peruvian side of Lake Titicaca 45 km offshore from the city of Puno. About 2,200 people live on the island, which is 5.5 by 1.6 kilometres (3.4 by 1.0 mile) in size (maximum measurements), with an area of 5.72 km^{2} (2.21 sq mi). The highest point of the island is 4,050 metres (13,287 feet) above sea level and the main village is at 3,950 metres (12,959 feet). The inhabitants, known as Taquileños, speak Puno Quechua.

In 2005, "Taquile and Its Textile Art" were honored by being proclaimed "Masterpieces of the Oral and Intangible Heritage of Humanity" by UNESCO.

== Textiles ==
Taquileños are known for their fine handwoven textiles and clothing, which are regarded as among the highest-quality handicrafts in Peru. Knitting is exclusively performed by males, beginning in early boyhood. Women spin wool and use vegetables and minerals to dye the wool to be used by the community. Women are also the weavers of the Chumpis, the wide belts with woven designs worn by everyone in the community of Taquile.

== Tourism ==
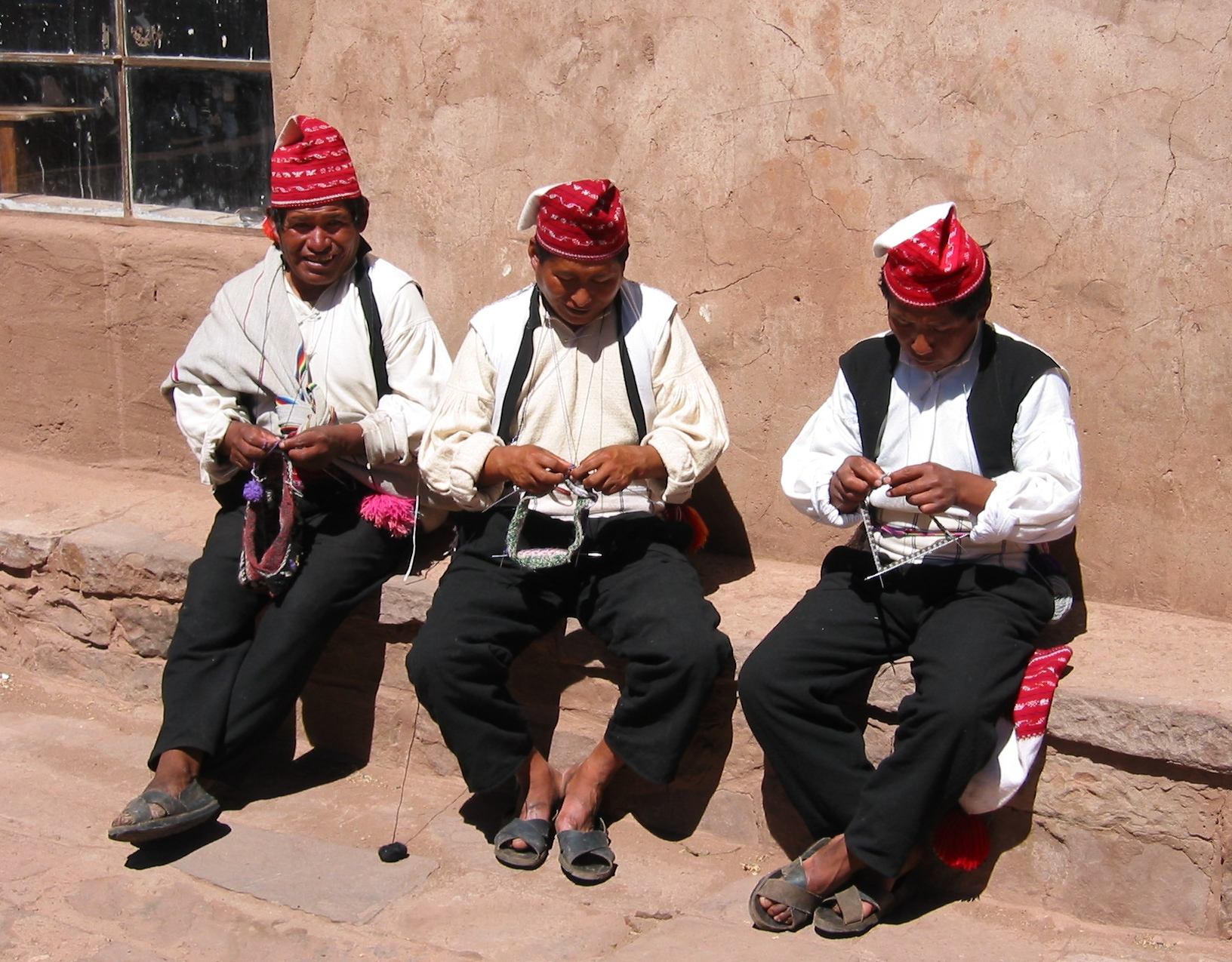
Taquileños knitting

Taquileans are known for having created an innovative, community-controlled sustainable tourism model, offering home stays, transportation, lodging for groups, cultural activities, local guides and restaurants. Ever since tourism started coming to Taquile in the 1970s, the Taquileans slowly lost control over the mass day-tourism operated by non-Taquileans. Taquile community have their own Travel Agency Munay Taquile has been established to regain local control over tourism.

== Climate ==
Climate data for Taquile Island, elevation 3,837 m (12,589 ft), (1991–2020)
Month	Jan	Feb	Mar	Apr	May	Jun	Jul	Aug	Sep	Oct	Nov	Dec	Year
Mean daily maximum °C (°F)	15.9 (60.6)	15.9 (60.6)	15.6 (60.1)	15.7 (60.3)	15.2 (59.4)	14.5 (58.1)	14.2 (57.6)	14.9 (58.8)	15.8 (60.4)	17.0 (62.6)	17.7 (63.9)	17.2 (63.0)	15.8 (60.5)
Mean daily minimum °C (°F)	6.3 (43.3)	6.4 (43.5)	6.4 (43.5)	6.2 (43.2)	5.1 (41.2)	4.0 (39.2)	3.4 (38.1)	3.9 (39.0)	5.0 (41.0)	5.9 (42.6)	6.7 (44.1)	6.7 (44.1)	5.5 (41.9)
Average precipitation mm (inches)	215.9 (8.50)	205.5 (8.09)	174.3 (6.86)	66.8 (2.63)	12.8 (0.50)	6.6 (0.26)	10.2 (0.40)	12.8 (0.50)	33.9 (1.33)	47.6 (1.87)	54.6 (2.15)	112.6 (4.43)	953.6 (37.52)
Source: National Meteorology and Hydrology Service of Peru

== Society and economy ==
Taquileños run their society based on community collectivism and on the Inca moral code ama sua, ama llulla, ama qhilla, (Quechua for "do not steal, do not lie, do not be lazy"). The island is divided into six sectors or suyus for crop rotation purposes. The economy is based on fishing, terraced farming horticulture based on potato cultivation and tourist-generated income from the approximately 40,000 tourists who visit each year. Taquile's families own rams, sheep, cows, chickens and sometimes guinea pigs.

== Cuisine ==
Taquile offers a wide range of typical dishes. Breakfast consists of two pancakes with sugar or bread with eggs, with a cup of tea made from either Muña or Coca. For lunch, dishes are a vegetable soup, fish with rice and a tomato and onion salad. For dinner, the Taquilean people serve vegetable soup with bread.

== Religion ==
The majority of the inhabitants of Taquile are Catholic. They adapted this religion, harmonizing Andean religion with the syncretic Christian culture. The mother earth (Pachamama), the principal Andean deity, directly controls harvesting and fertility; the island is home to four Apus, Andean mountaintop deities. People make several offerings to these deities each year, and they offer three coca leaves prior to each activity or trip. God is present throughout the year in the festivities. The two Catholic churches are in Centre and Huayllano; a Seventh-day Adventist church is located in Huayrapata.

== Infrastructure ==
Taquile has a radio station and is equipped with generators. Islanders have elected to use solar panels to generate energy.

== Flora ==
Flowers and trees on the Island include Kolle, the tree used to roof the houses and for firewood, the Cantuta flower (the national flower of Peru), the Chukjo (used as detergent) and Muña, used as natural medicines. Coca leaves are not cultivated in Taquile.

== Gallery ==
Pélérinage Iglesia de Nuestra Señora (Taquile).- Pérou

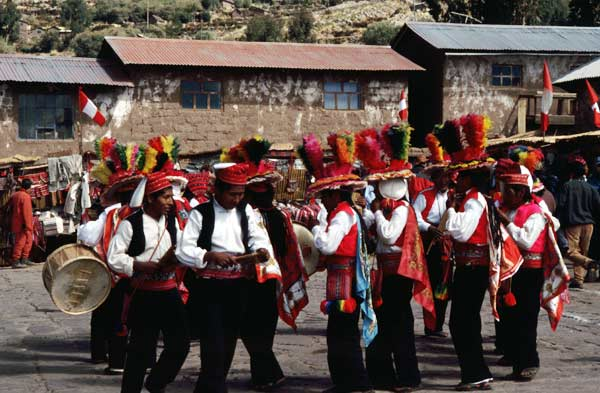
A festival on Taquile

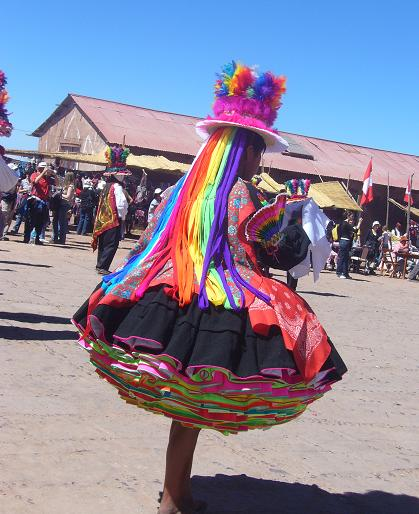
The annual Fiesta de Santiago

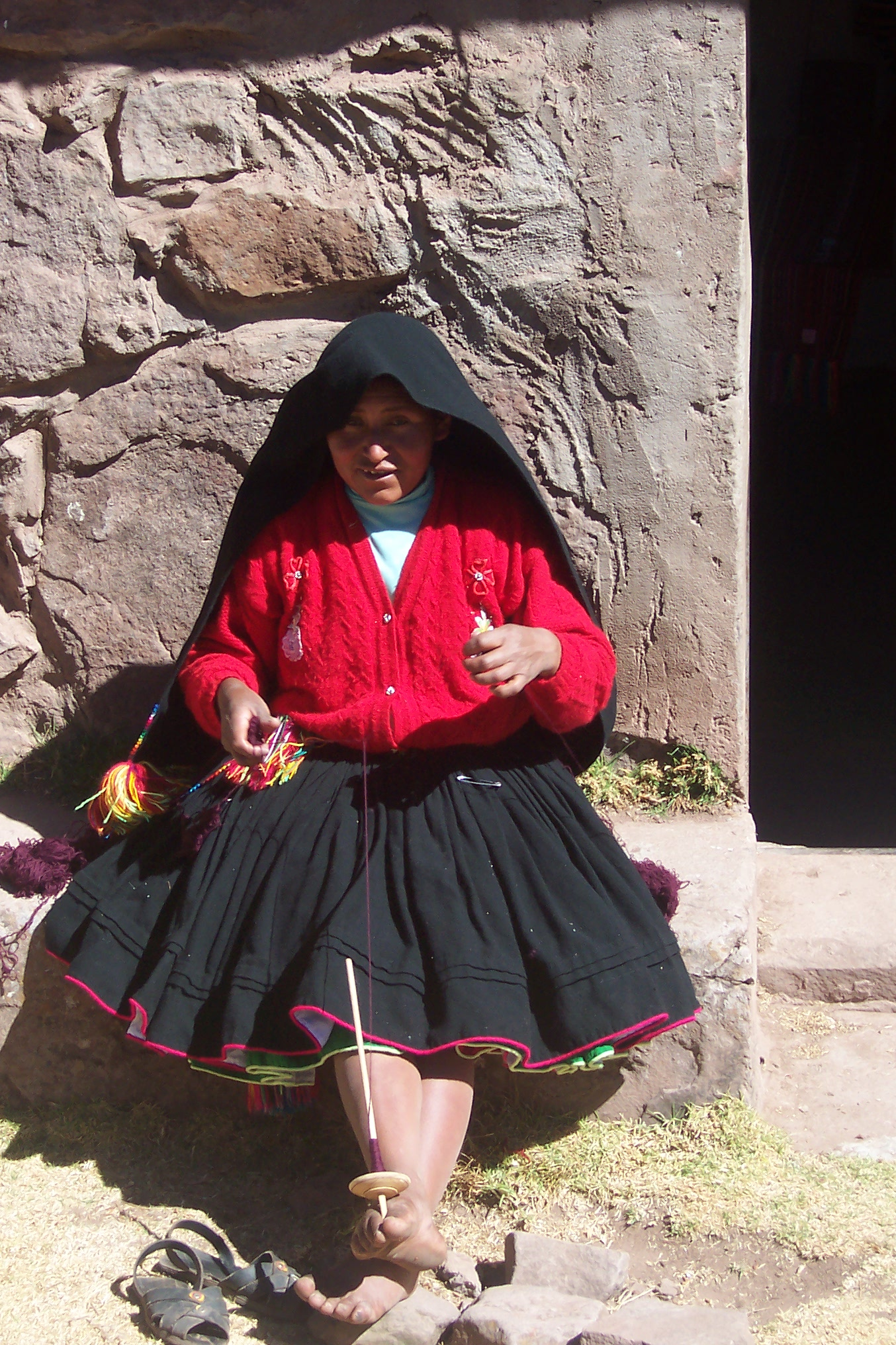
Taquile, Puno, Perú. Mujer hilando

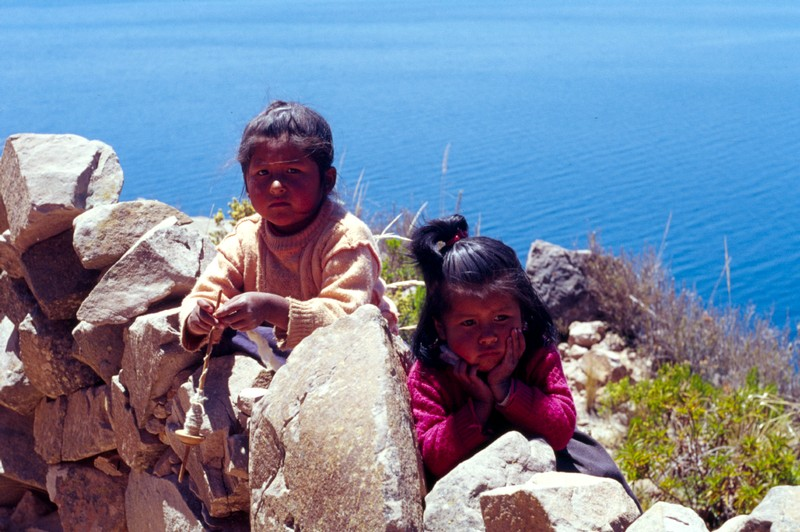
Taquile, Peru: Lake Titicaca Children of Taquile

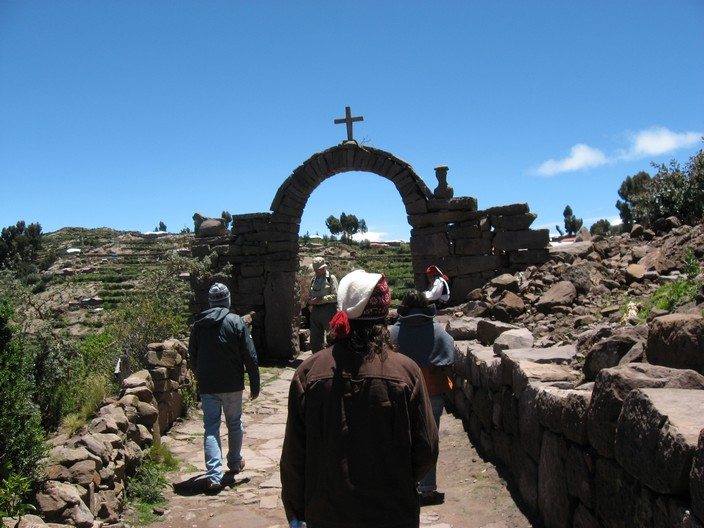
The Arch leading to the main square of the island

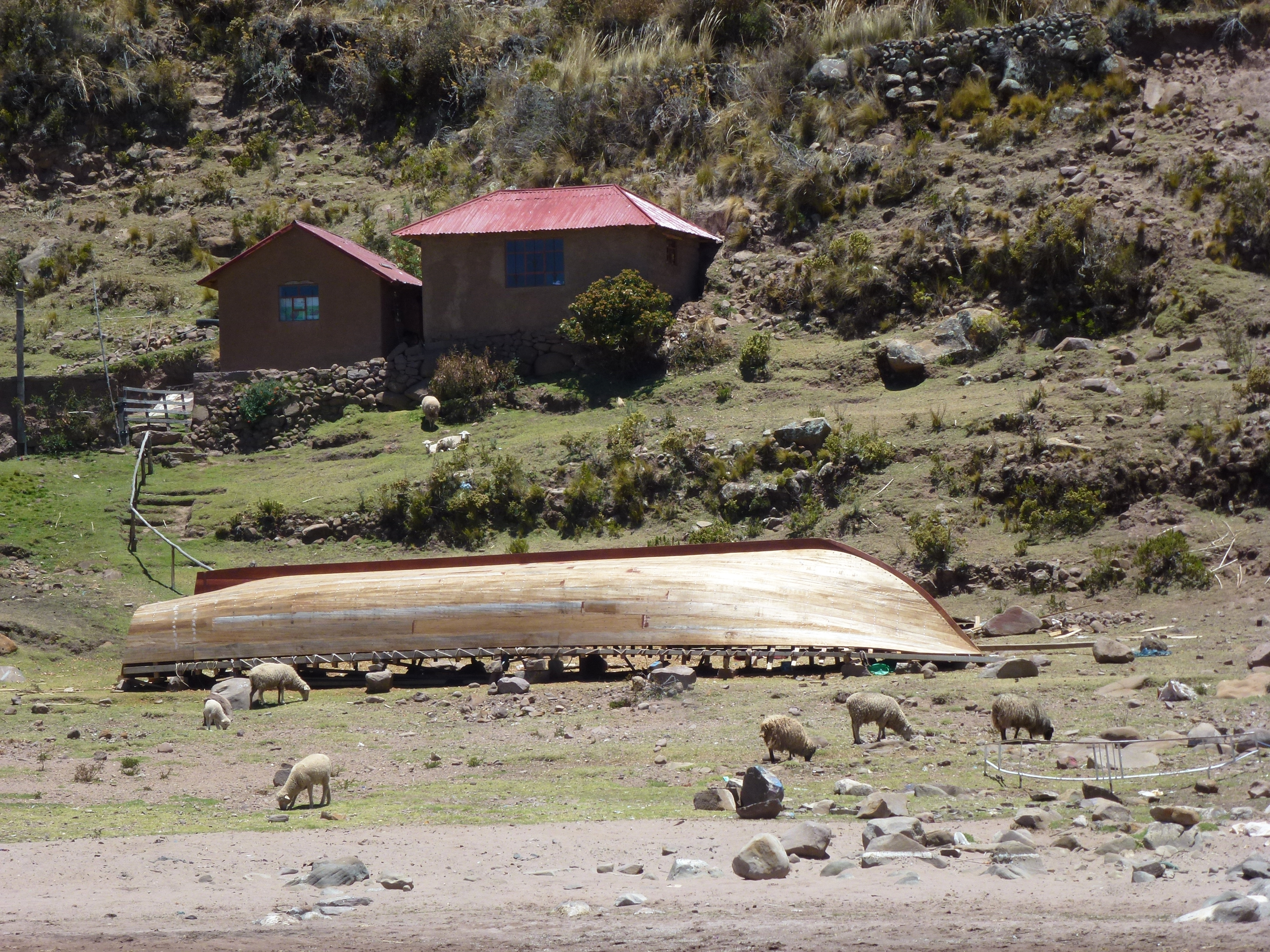
Banks of the lake Titicaca

== See also ==
- Iperu, tourist information and assistance
- Tourism in Peru

== Bibliography ==
- Kusikiy A Child from Taquile, Peru, 2010 ISBN 978-0-9844079-8-9
- Elayne Zorn, 2004. Weaving a Future: Tourism, Cloth and Culture on an Andean Island, Iowa City: University of Iowa Press. ISBN 0-87745-916-9
