= Vilque District =

Coordinates: 15.7662°S 70.2611°W

Vilque Willk'i
- District
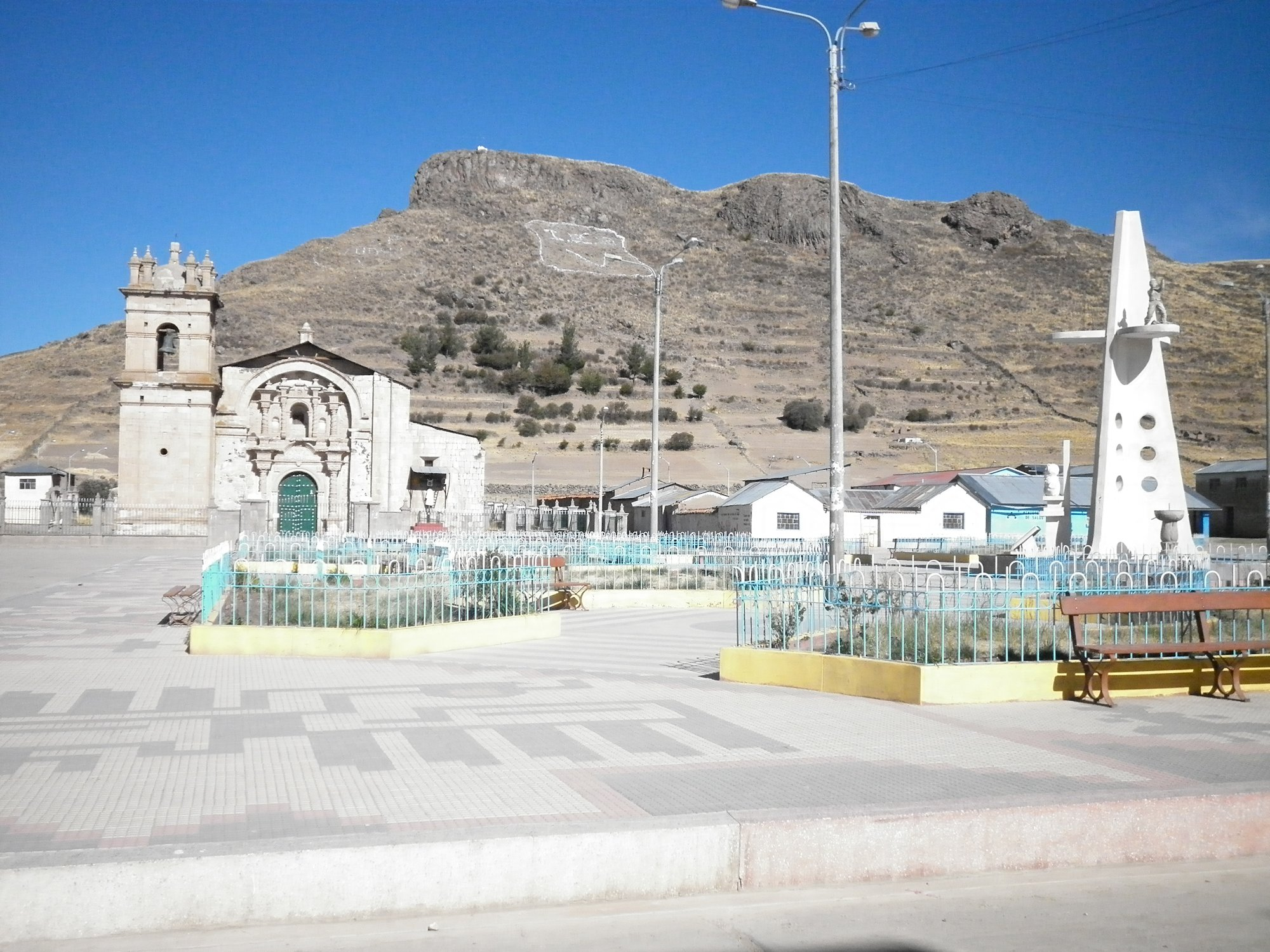
- Main square in Vilque
- Interactive map of Vilque
- Country: Peru
- Region: Puno
- Province: Puno
- Capital: Vilque

Government
  - Mayor: Juan Carlos Mendoza Castillo

Area
  - Total: 193.29 km^{2} (74.63 sq mi)
- Elevation: 3,860 m (12,660 ft)

Population (2005 census)
  - Total: 2,947
  - Density: 15.25/km^{2} (39.49/sq mi)
- Time zone: UTC-5 (PET)
- UBIGEO: 210115

Vilque District is one of fifteen districts of the province Puno in Peru. Vilque was the location of the major fair during the nineteenth century of goods from Bolivia and Argentina and especially for mules from Salta.

== Ethnic groups ==
The people in the district are mainly indigenous citizens of Quechua descent. Quechua is the language which the majority of the population (75.26%) learnt to speak in childhood, 24.12% of the residents started speaking using the Spanish language (2007 Peru Census).
