= Puno =

City in south-eastern Peru

Puno San Carlos de Puno
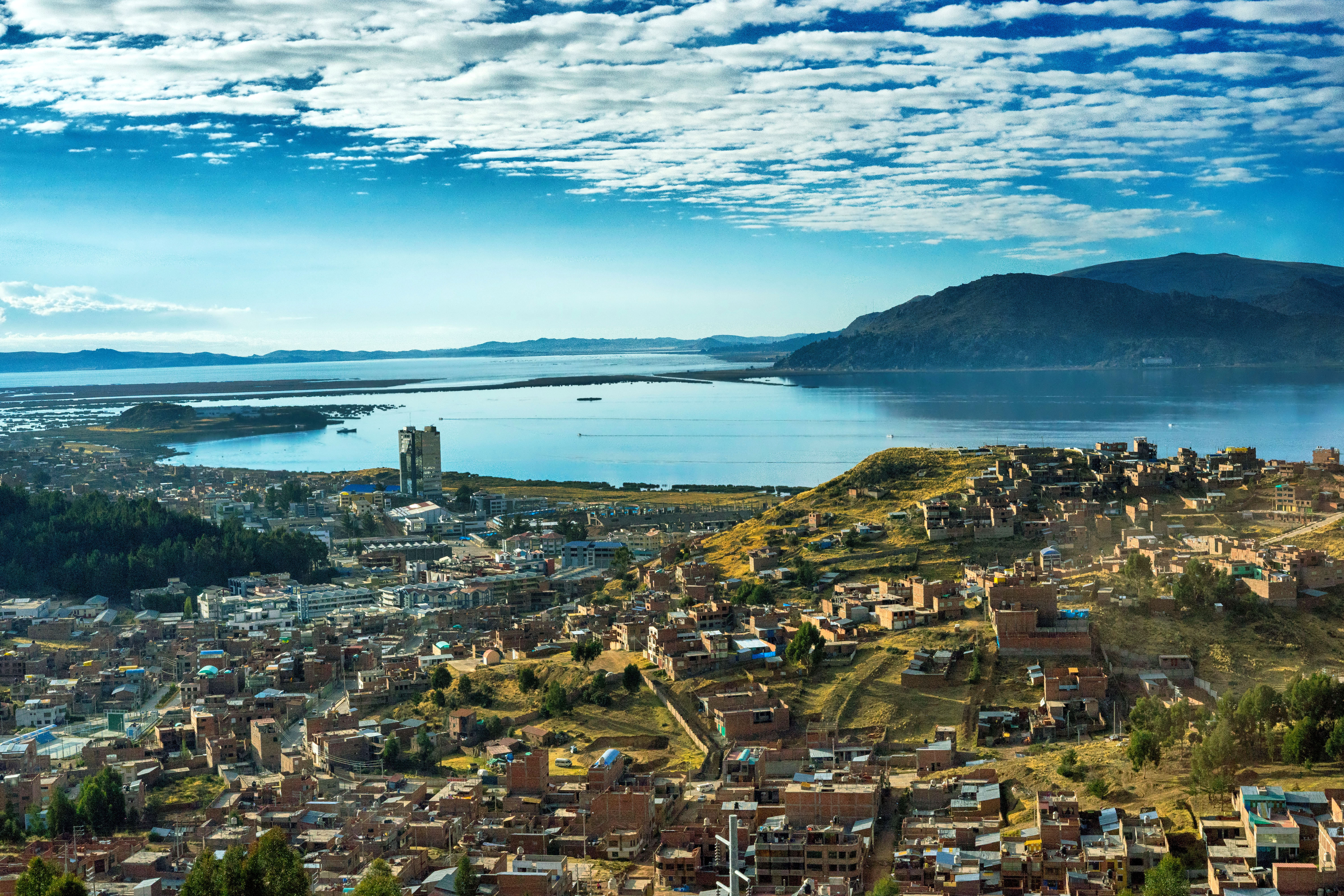
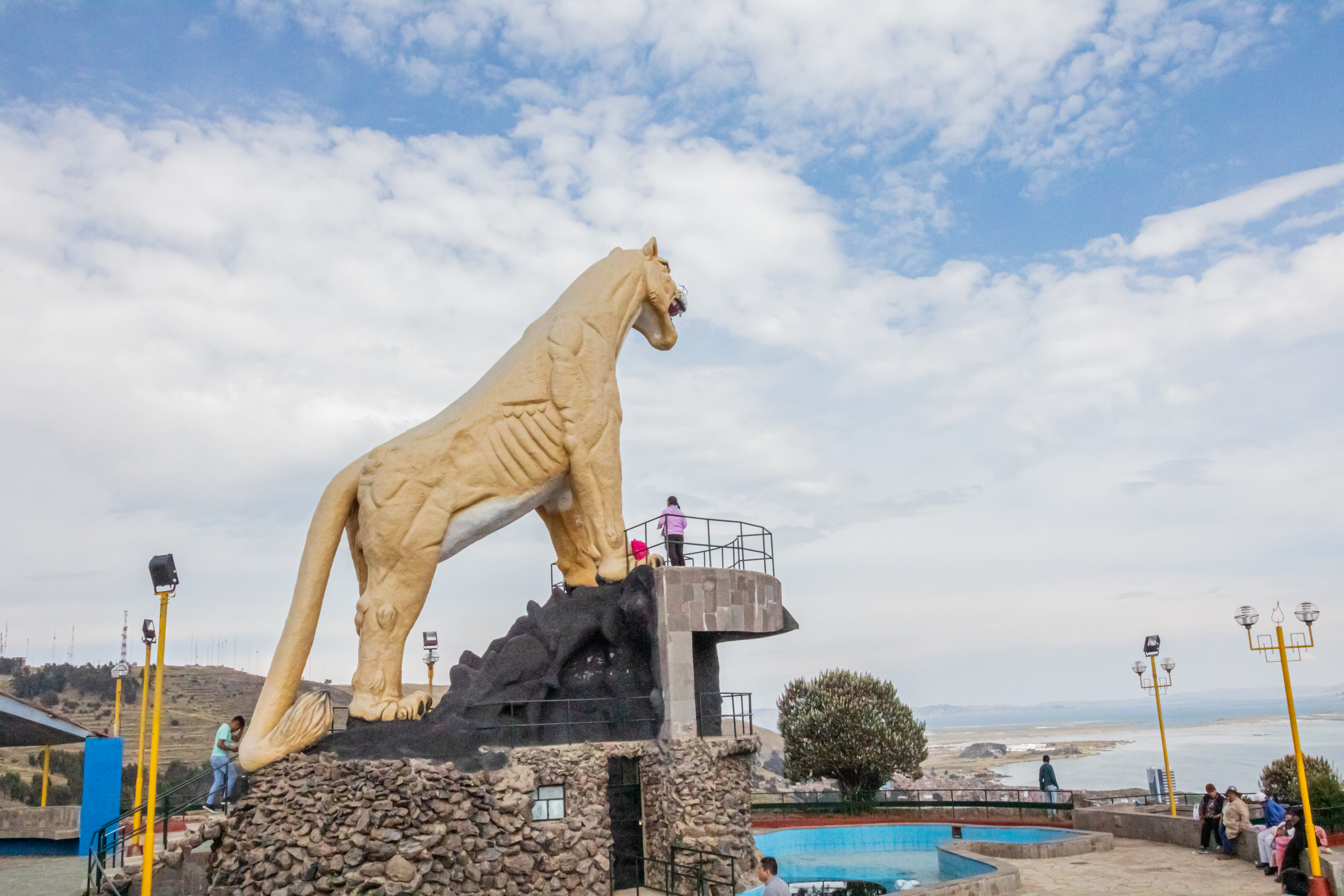
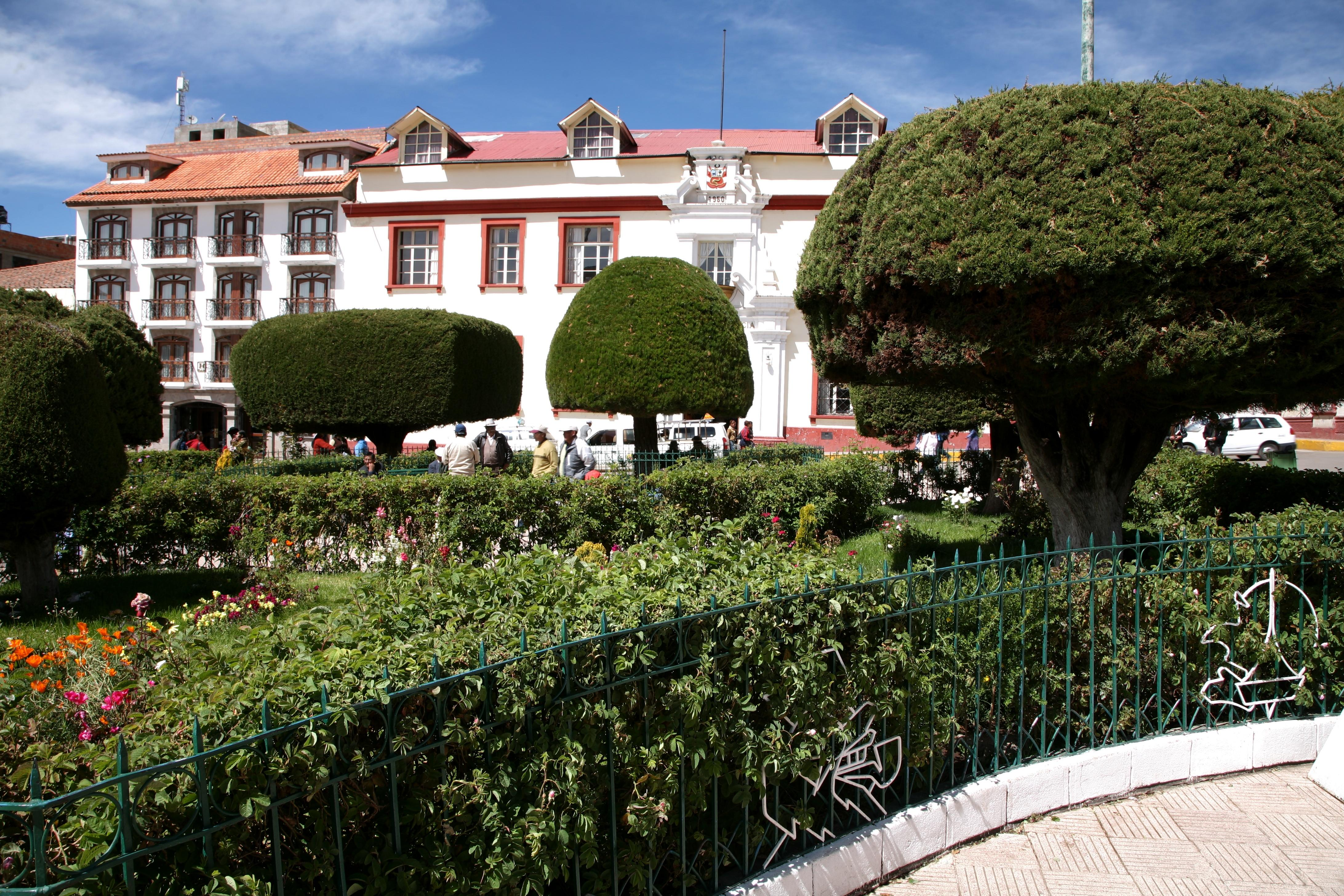
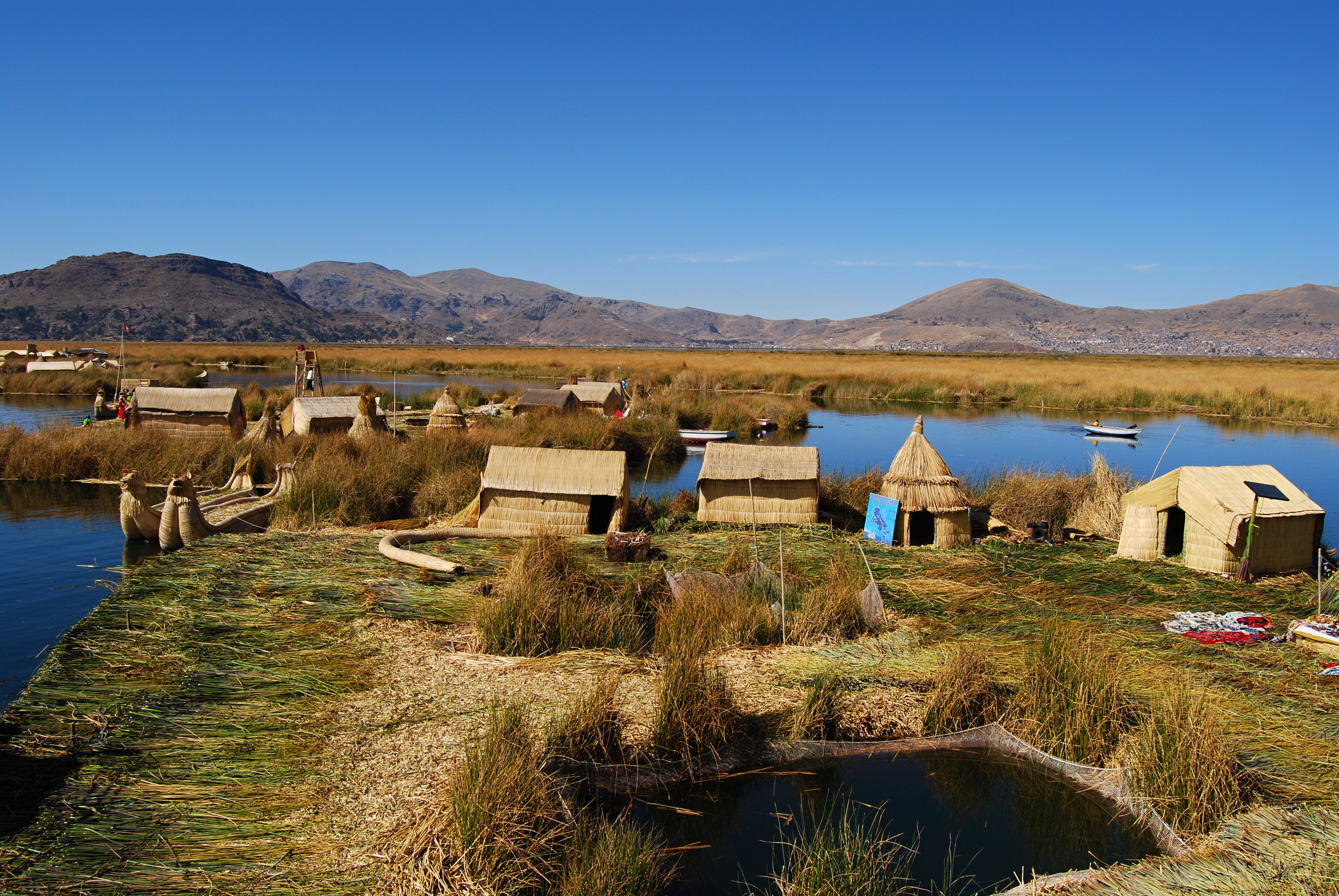
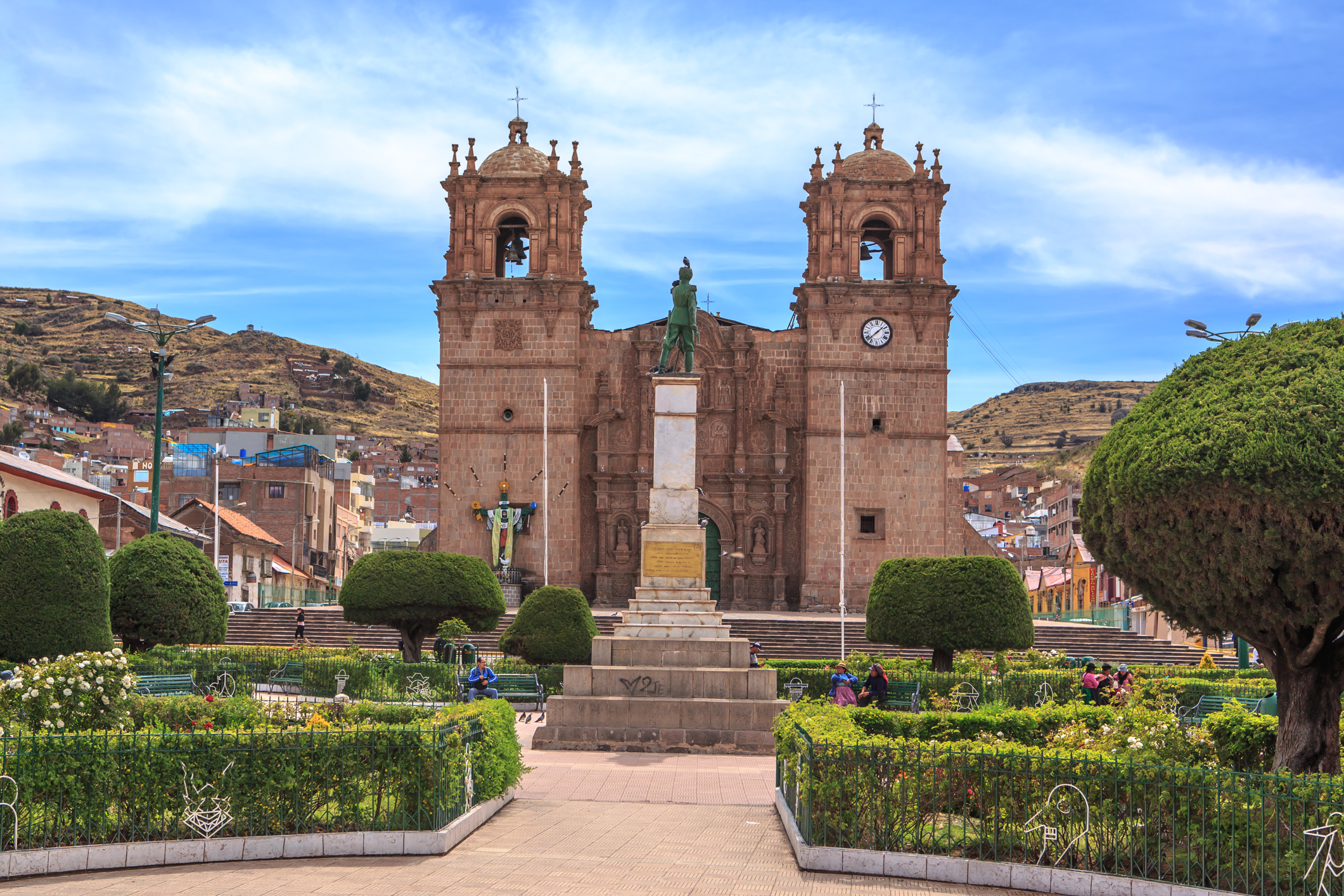
- Puno and Lake Titicaca, Mirador Puma Uta, Floating islands of Uros and Puno Cathedral

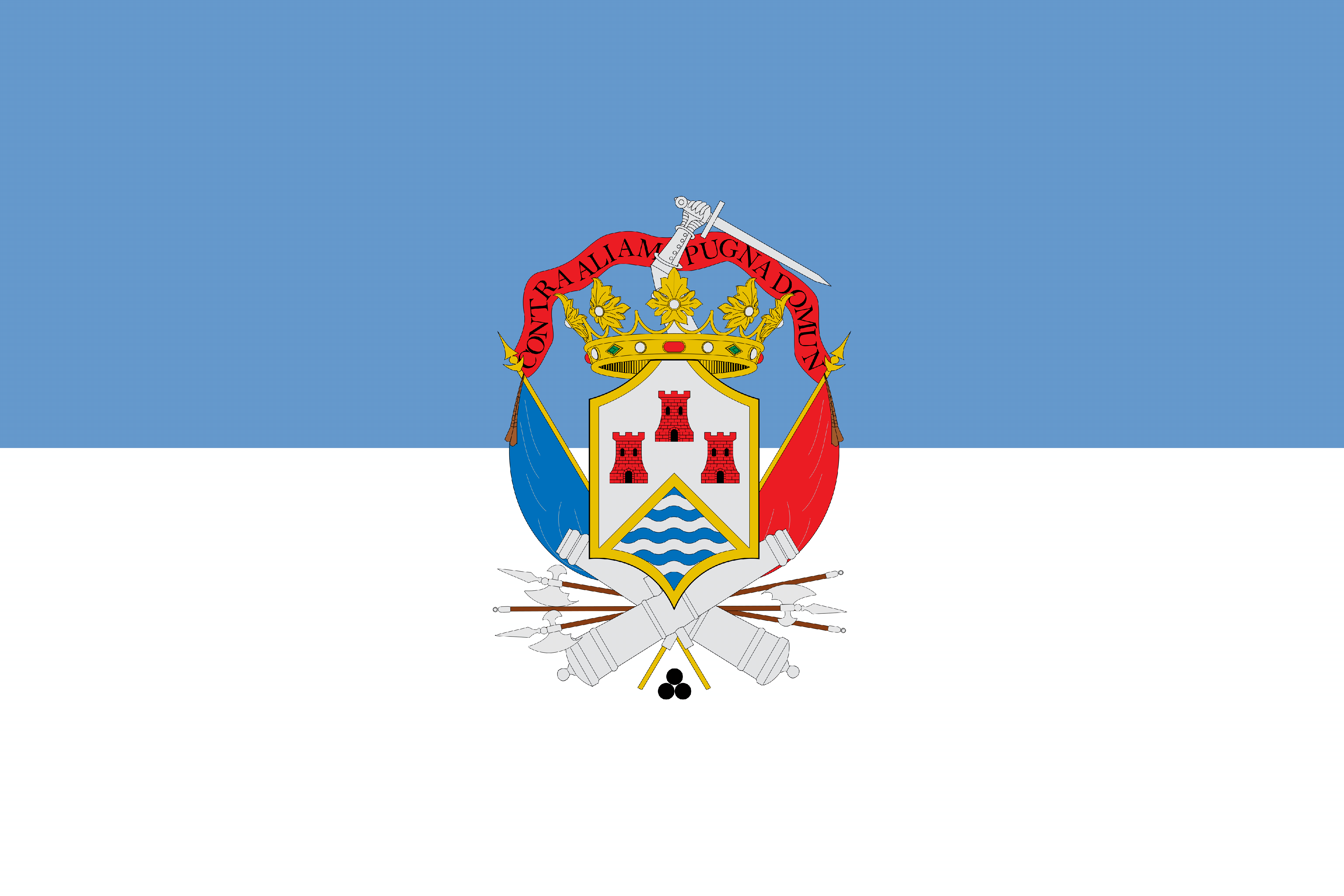
- Flag Seal
- Nickname: Ciudad del Lago (City of the lake)
- Location within Peru
- Coordinates: 15°50′36″S 70°01′25″W
- Country: Peru
- Region: Puno
- Province: Puno
- Founded: November 4, 1668

Government
  - Mayor: Javier Ponce Roque (2023-2026)

Area
  - Total: 53.28 km^{2} (20.57 sq mi)
- Elevation: 3,830 m (12,570 ft)

Population (2017)
  - Total: 135,288
  - Estimate (2015): 140,839
  - Density: 2,539/km^{2} (6,576/sq mi)
- Time zone: UTC-5
- Area code: 51

Puno (Aymara and Quechua: Punu) is a city in southeastern Peru, located on the shore of Lake Titicaca. It is the capital city of the eponymous Puno Province and Puno Region; in 2017, it had a population of 135,288 (2017 census). The city was established in 1668 by viceroy Pedro Antonio Fernández de Castro as capital of the province of Paucarcolla with the name San Juan Bautista de Puno. The name was later changed to San Carlos de Puno, in honor of king Charles II of Spain. Puno has several churches dating back from the colonial period; they were built to service the Spanish population and evangelize the Quechua people.

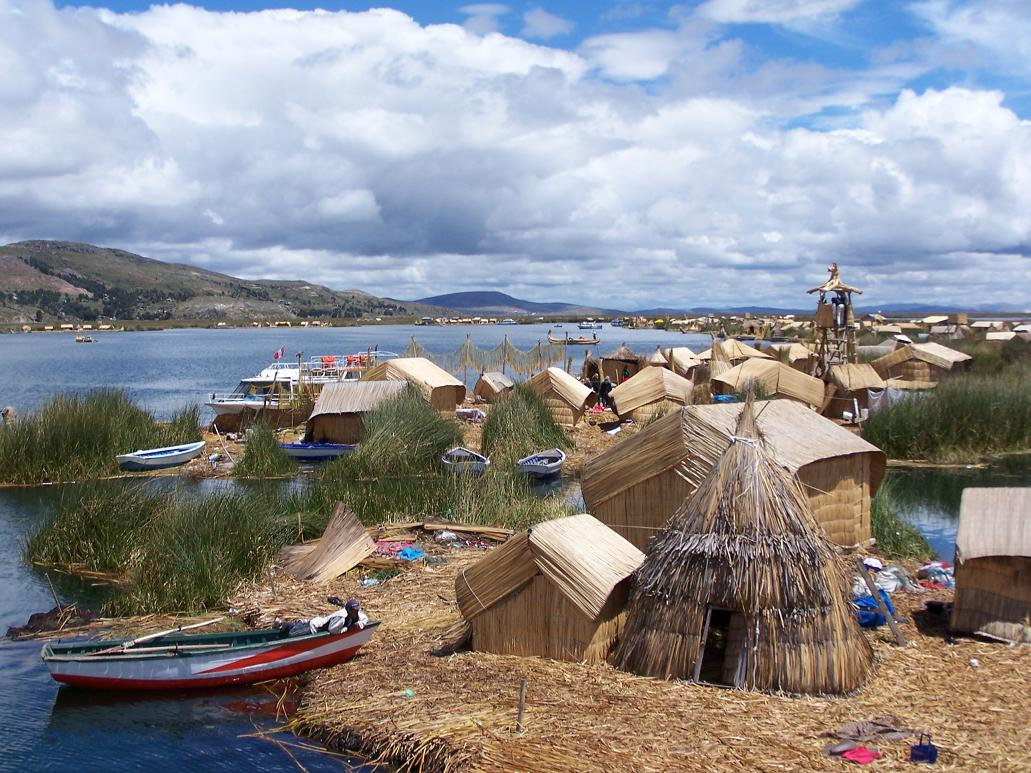
Uros people's Floating islands at Lake Titicaca

== Education ==
Puno is home to the Universidad Nacional del Altiplano de Puno (UNAP), which was founded in 1856.

== Transport ==
Puno is served by the Inca Manco Capac International Airport in nearby Juliaca.

PeruRail operates a train from Puno–Juliaca–Cusco–Arequipa. The luxury sleeper train, Belmond Andean Explorer, is operated from Cusco for a one-night journey to Puno.

== Climate ==
Puno features a subtropical highland climate (Köppen: Cwb, Trewartha: Cwlk).

As Puno is located at such a high elevation, it experiences more extreme weather conditions than would be expected for its tropical latitude. The average annual temperature is about 8.4 °C (47.1 °F), and the weather never gets overly warm. During the winter from June to August, night-time temperatures usually drop below 0 °C (32 °F). At this high altitude, the rays of the sun are very strong. Most of the annual precipitation falls during the Southern Hemisphere summer, with the winters being very dry.

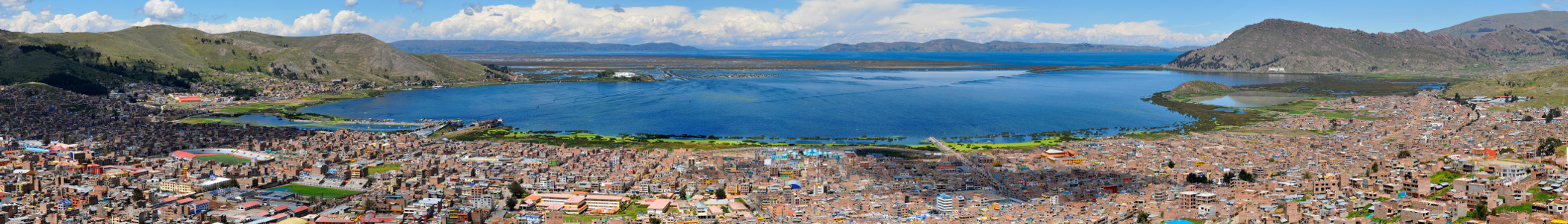
Lake Titicaca

Climate data for Puno, elevation 3,825 m (12,549 ft), (1991–2020)
| Month | Jan | Feb | Mar | Apr | May | Jun | Jul | Aug | Sep | Oct | Nov | Dec | Year |
|---|---|---|---|---|---|---|---|---|---|---|---|---|---|
| Mean daily maximum °C (°F) | 16.0 (60.8) | 15.7 (60.3) | 15.6 (60.1) | 15.7 (60.3) | 15.5 (59.9) | 14.8 (58.6) | 14.9 (58.8) | 15.7 (60.3) | 16.6 (61.9) | 17.2 (63.0) | 17.7 (63.9) | 17.2 (63.0) | 16.0 (60.9) |
| Daily mean °C (°F) | 11.0 (51.8) | 10.8 (51.4) | 10.6 (51.1) | 9.9 (49.8) | 8.4 (47.1) | 7.2 (45.0) | 7.1 (44.8) | 8.1 (46.6) | 9.5 (49.1) | 10.0 (50.0) | 11.2 (52.2) | 11.4 (52.5) | 9.6 (49.3) |
| Mean daily minimum °C (°F) | 5.9 (42.6) | 5.9 (42.6) | 5.5 (41.9) | 4.0 (39.2) | 1.2 (34.2) | −0.5 (31.1) | −0.8 (30.6) | 0.4 (32.7) | 2.3 (36.1) | 3.8 (38.8) | 4.7 (40.5) | 5.6 (42.1) | 3.2 (37.7) |
| Average precipitation mm (inches) | 158.7 (6.25) | 144.9 (5.70) | 116.3 (4.58) | 50.8 (2.00) | 7.2 (0.28) | 3.0 (0.12) | 3.4 (0.13) | 9.6 (0.38) | 23.5 (0.93) | 44.1 (1.74) | 40.0 (1.57) | 87.6 (3.45) | 689.1 (27.13) |
Source: National Meteorology and Hydrology Service of Peru

== Folklore ==
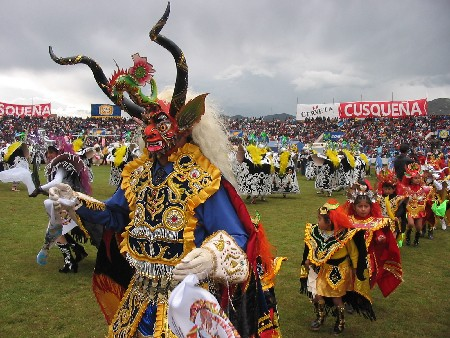
Diablada puneña during the Festival de la Candelaria in Peru

Music and dance are typical parts of the Puno folklore. The most important dances are the Wifala de Asillo, the Ichu Carnival, the Tuntuna, the Khashua de Capachica, the Machu-tusuj, the Kcajelo, and the Pandilla Puneña.

== Gallery ==
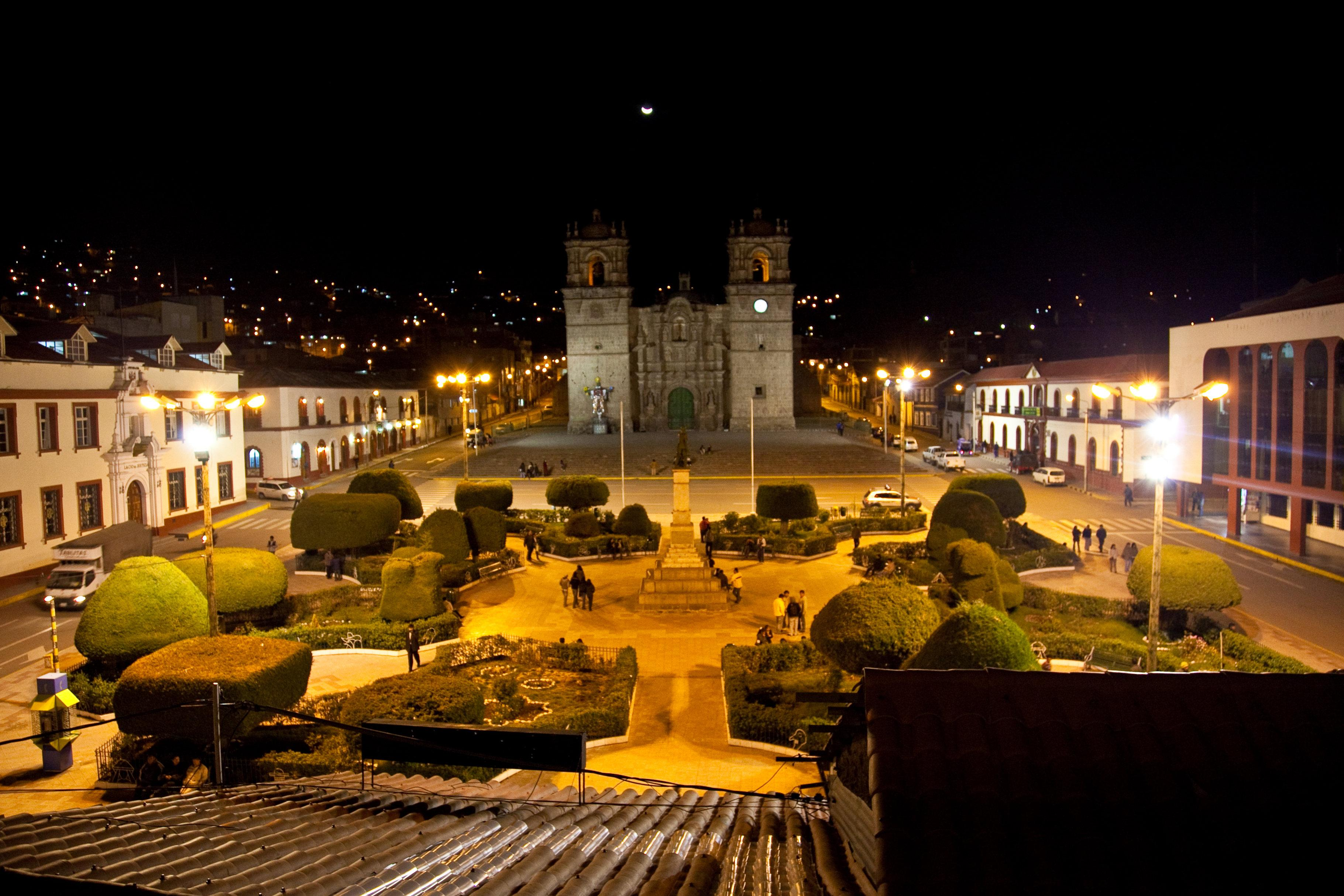
Plaza de Armas.

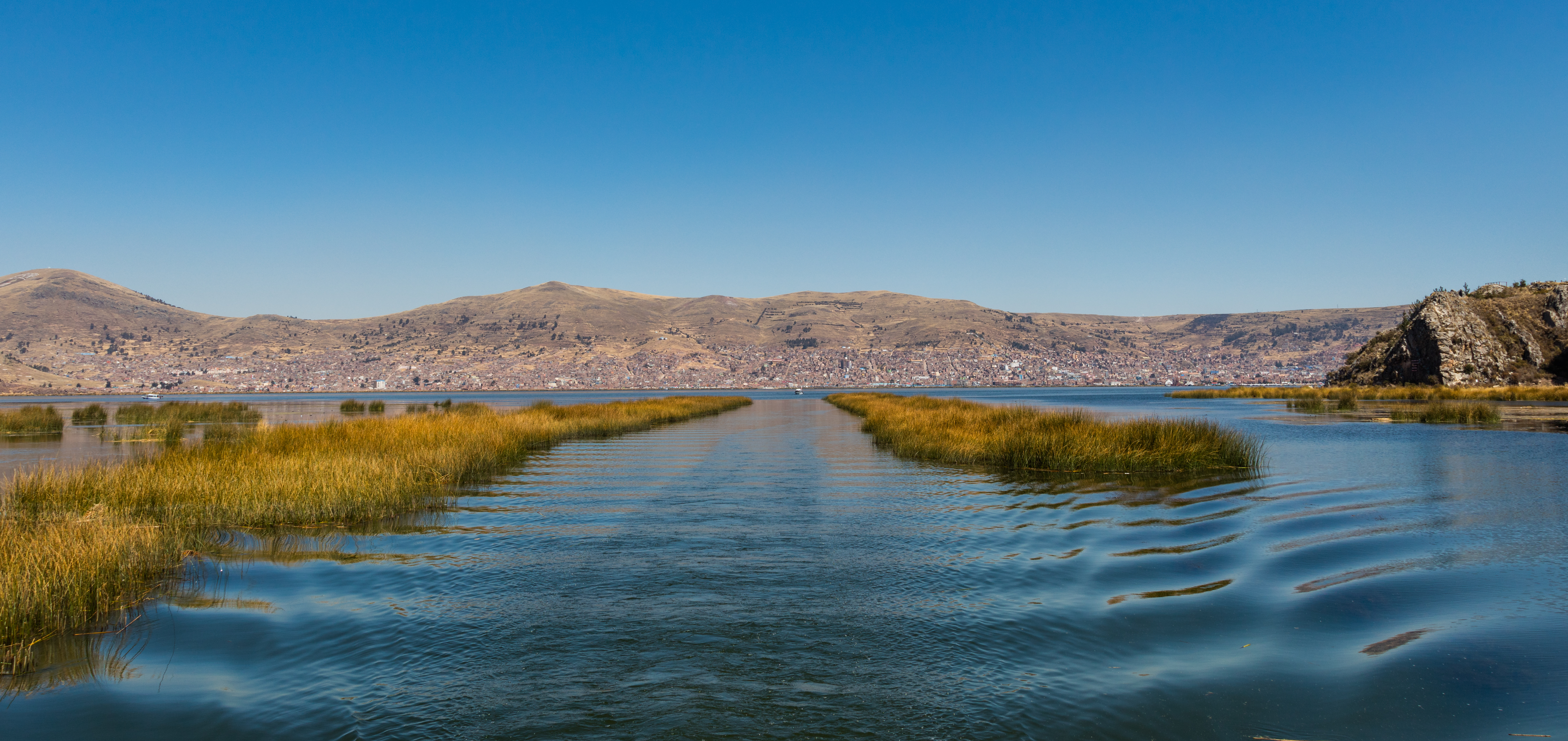
Lake Titicaca as seen from the shore

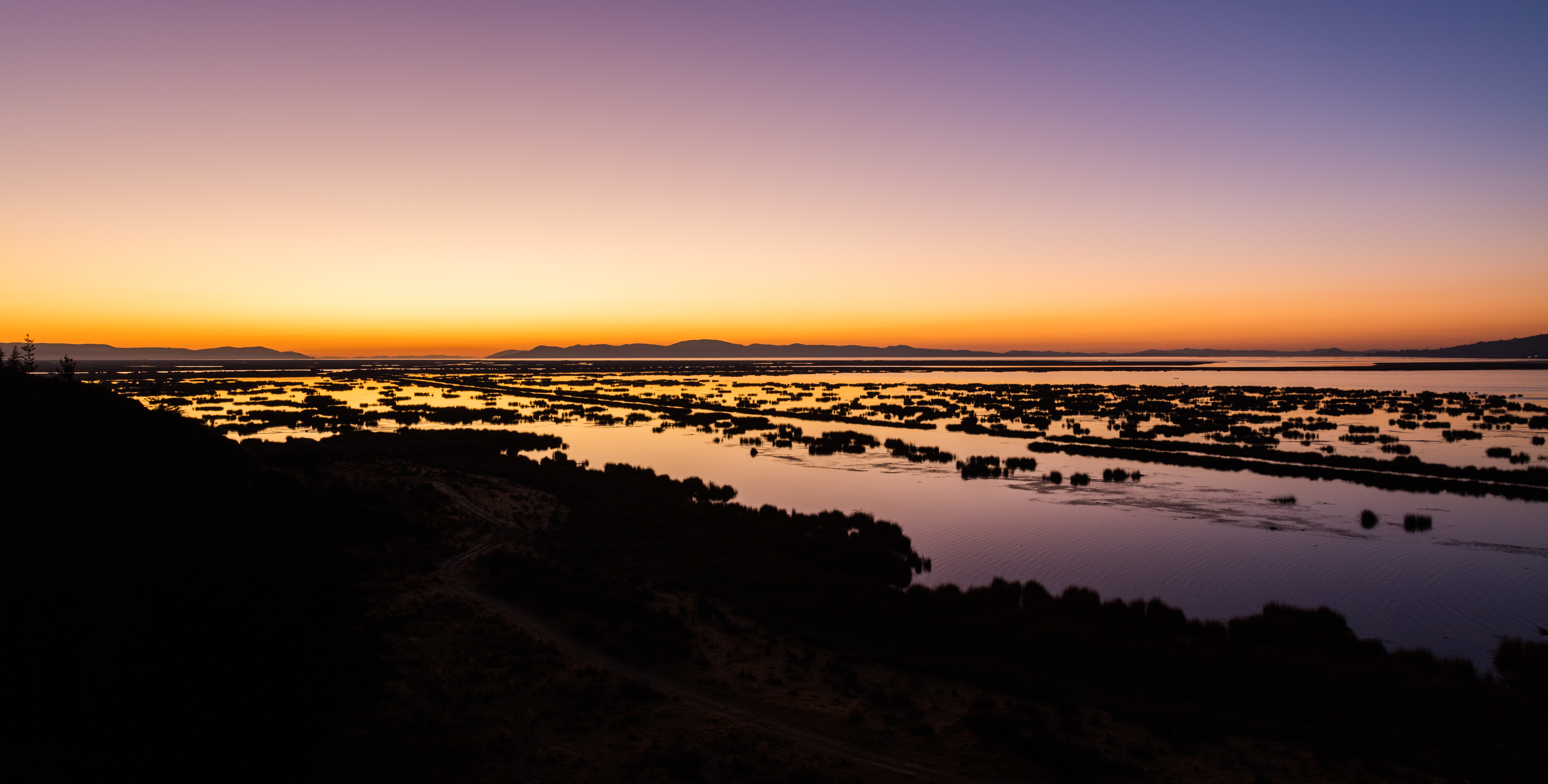
Sunrise in the Titicaca

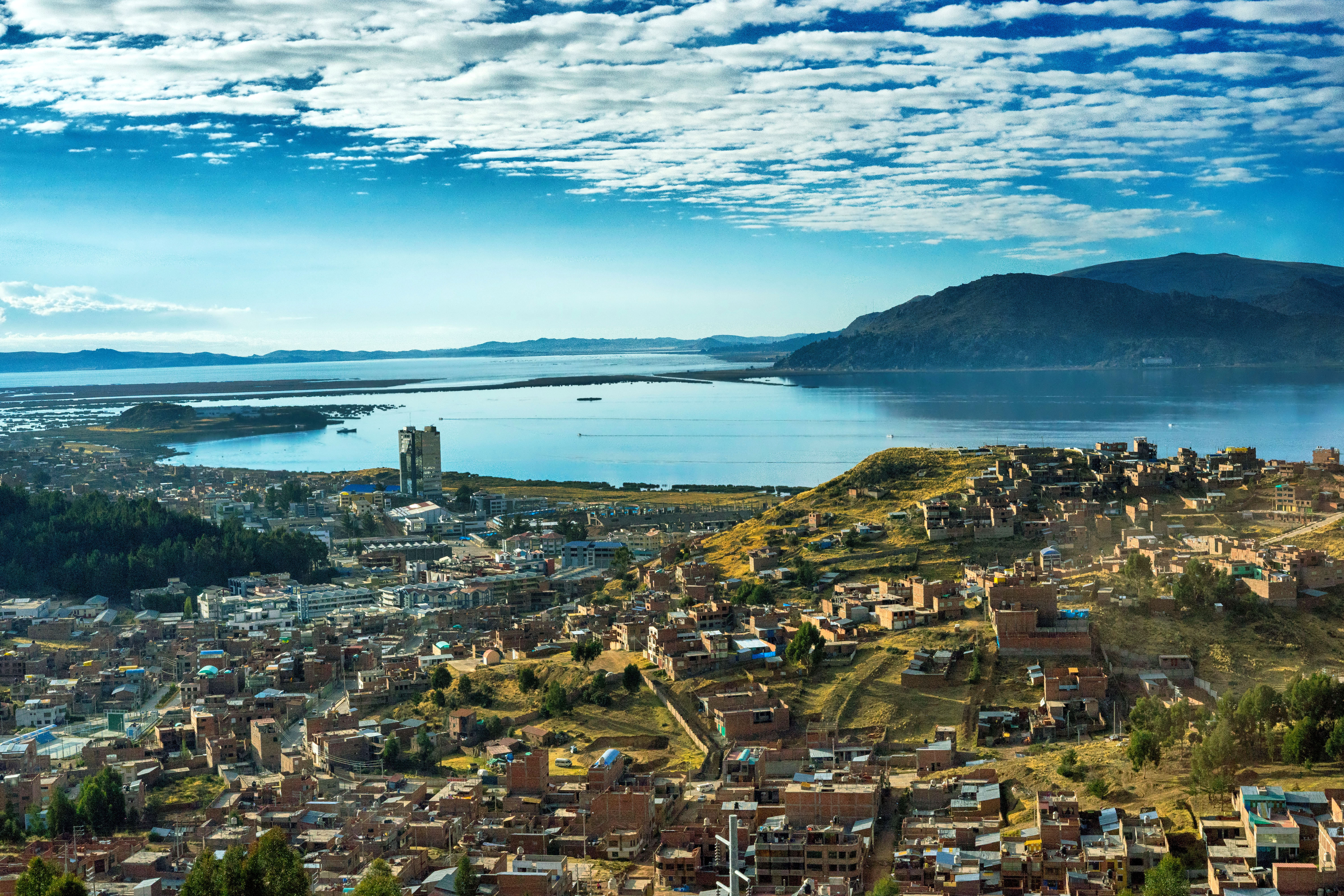
Puno and Titicaca.

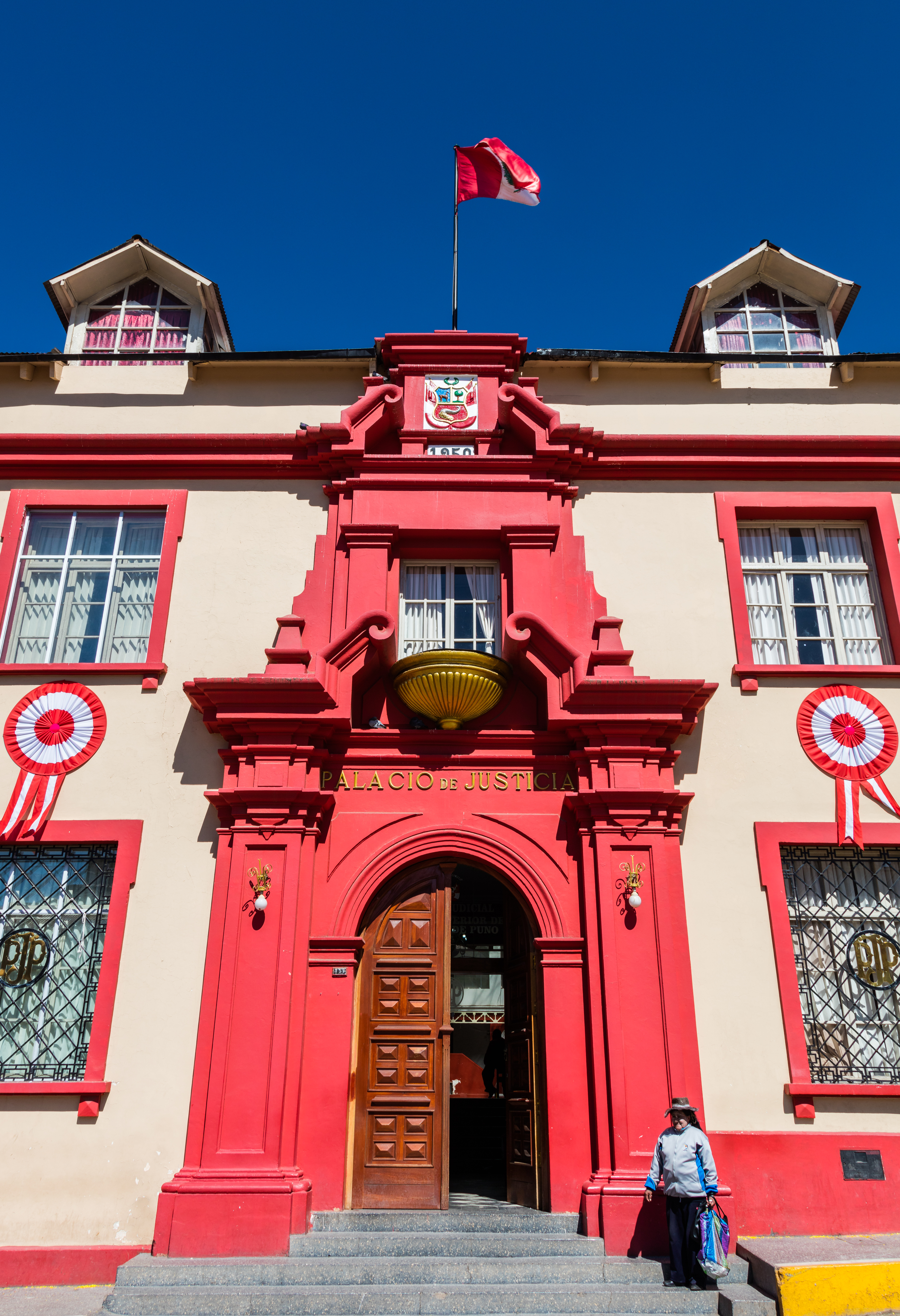
Justice Palace

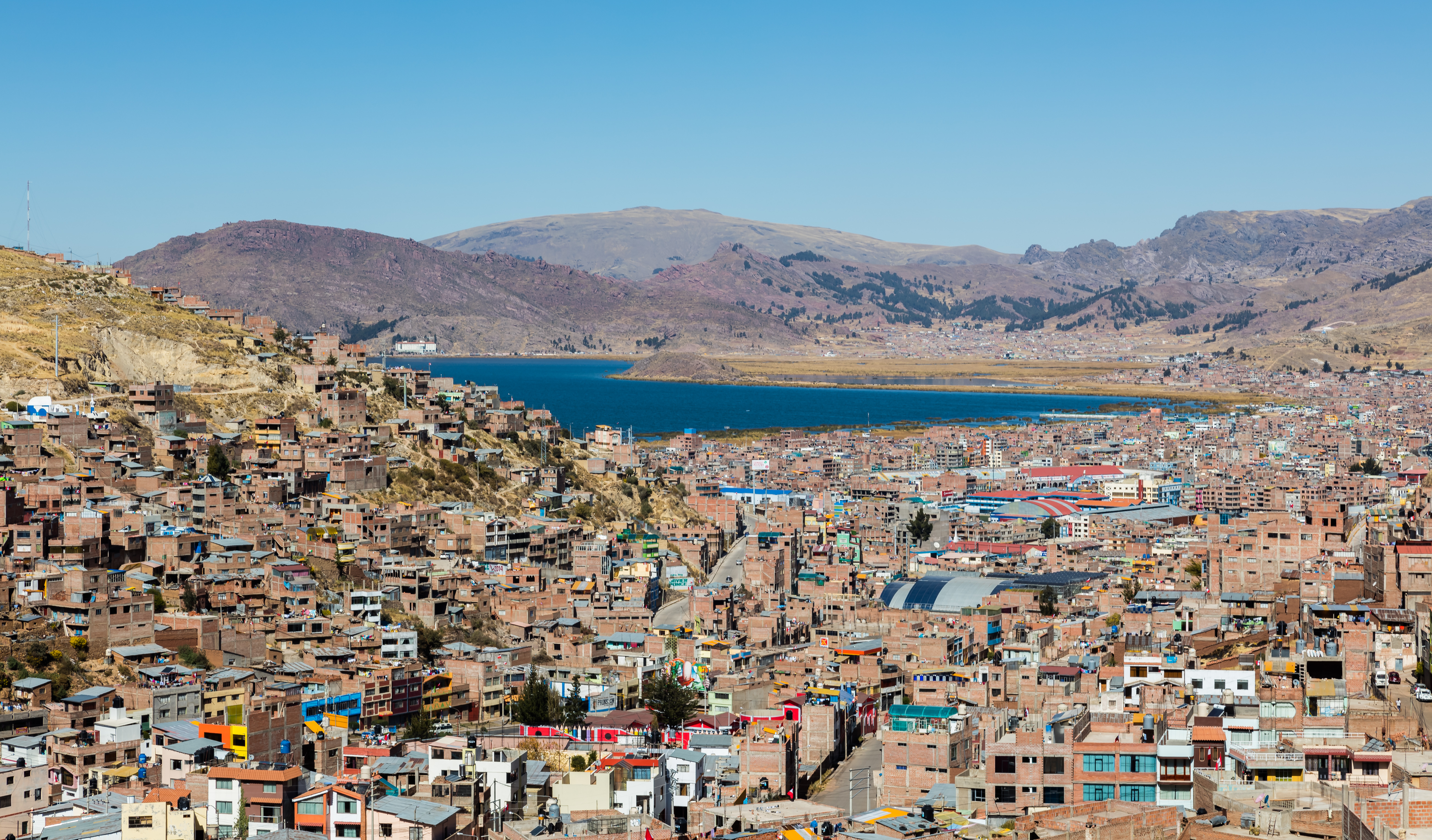
Puno from the north

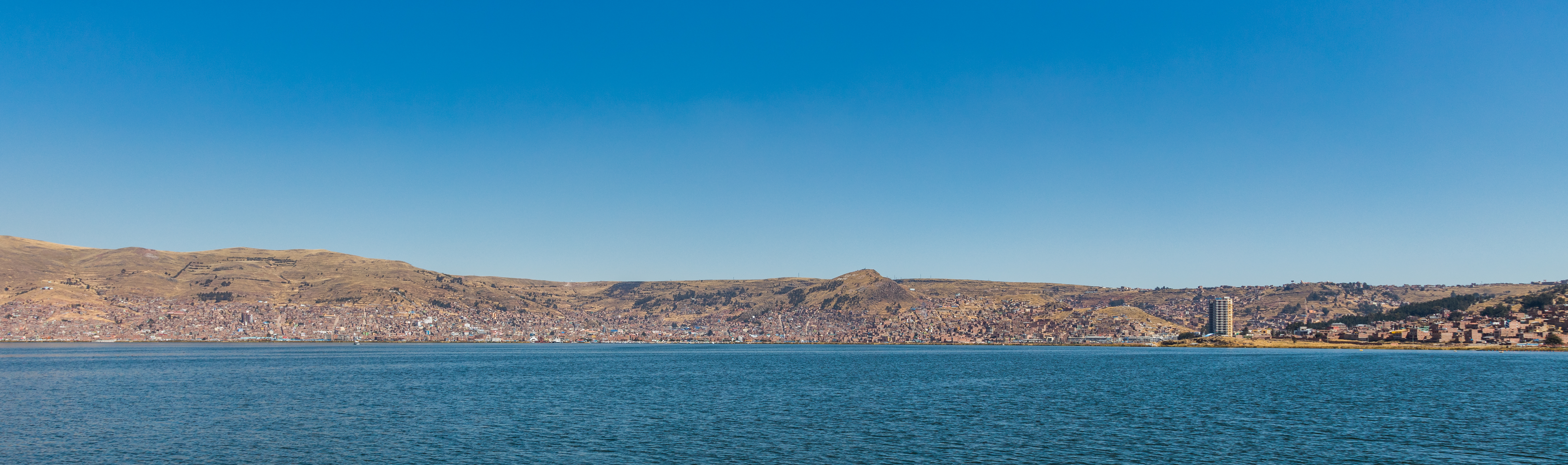
Puno from Titicaca

== See also ==
- Esteves (island)
- Lake Titicaca rail ferry
