= Amantaní =

Island of Peru

Coordinates: 15°39′51″S 69°42′36″W

Amantani
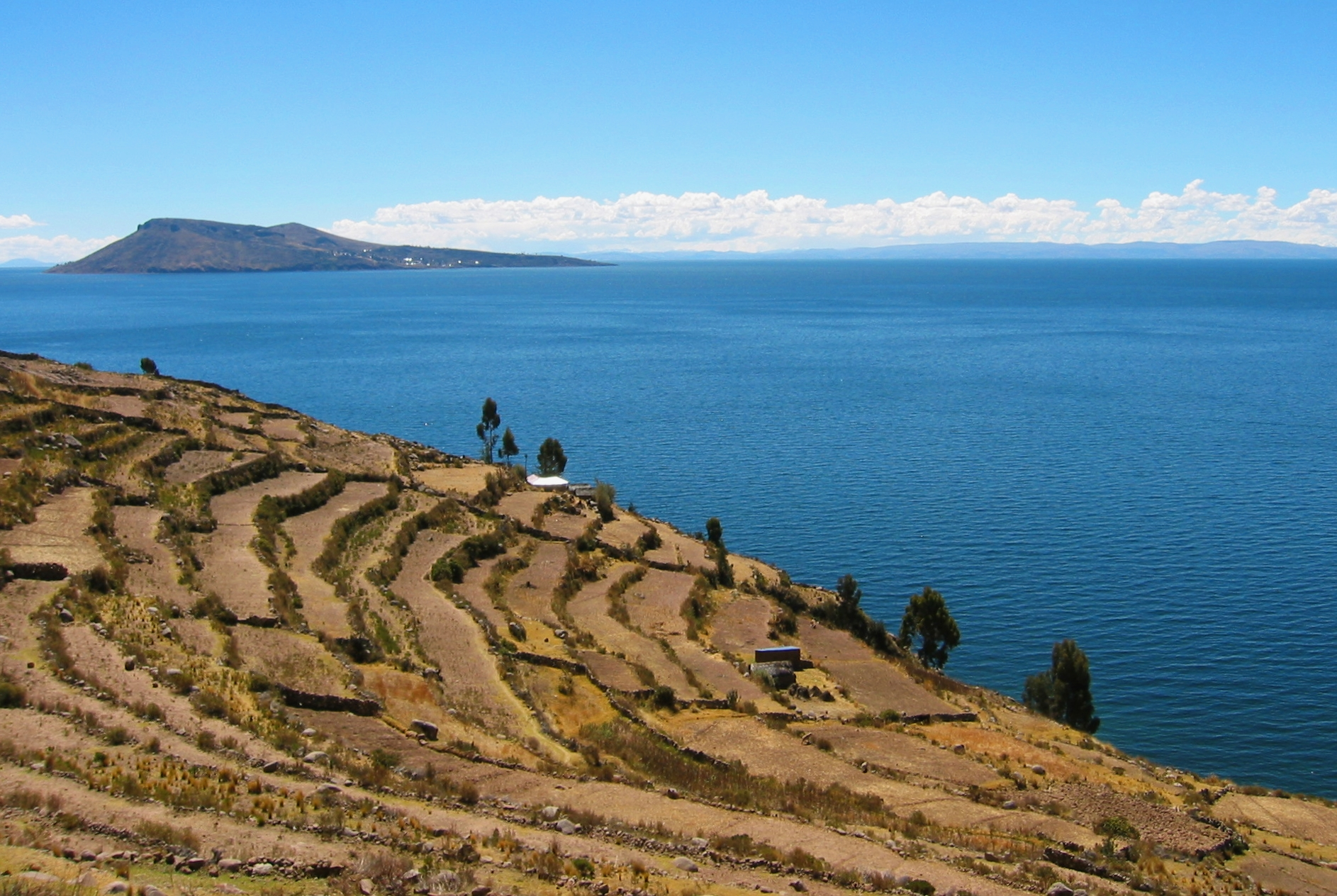
- Amantani in the distance as seen from Taquile
- Interactive map of Amantani

Geography
- Location: Lake Titicaca
- Area: 9.28 km^{2} (3.58 sq mi)
- Highest point: Pachatata

Administration
- Peru

Demographics
- Population: 3557 (2017)
- Ethnic groups: Quechua

Amantani is an island on the Peruvian side of Lake Titicaca. According to a 1988 census, it had a population of 3,663 Quechua speakers divided among about 800 families. The most current census (2017) estimates a population of 3,557. The island is circular and about 9.28 km^{2} (3.58 sq mi) in size. It has two mountain peaks, Pachatata ("father earth") and Pachamama ("mother earth"), with ancient Inca and Tiwanaku ruins on top of both. The hillsides are terraced, mostly worked by hand, and planted with wheat, quinoa, potatoes, and other vegetables. Livestock, including sheep, also graze the slopes.

Amantani is known as the "Island of the Kantuta", after the national flower of Peru and Bolivia, which grows plentifully on the island.

== Overview ==
The temples at the top of the peaks are generally closed during the year. Entrance is permitted on the morning of the annual feast day on or around January 20 (the third Thursday in January), at which time the island's population divides in two, with each group gathering at its respective temple. A race is then held from each peak to a point somewhere between the two, and a representative of each group is chosen to run. According to tradition, a victory for Pachamama portends a bountiful harvest in the year to come.

Similar to the Taquileños, the inhabitants of Amantani are also known for their textiles, as well as their ceramics. Most of the inhabitants live in houses of adobe. There is a small health clinic and school on Amantaní. The island has no cars but does have a generator, though it is no longer functional.

There are no hotels, but some of the families on Amantani open their homes to tourists for overnight stays and provide cooked meals, arranged through tour guides. The families who do so are required to have a special room set aside for the tourists and must fit a code by the tour companies that help them. Guests typically take food staples (cooking oil, rice, fruits) as a gift or school supplies for the children on the island. Sweets and sugar are not recommended as regular dental care is uncommon on the island. They hold nightly traditional dance shows for the tourists where they offer to dress them up in their traditional clothes and participate. Women of the families also offer self-made alpaca-hats to their visitors as cover for the night-breeze, which the visitors are most welcome to buy at the end of their stay.

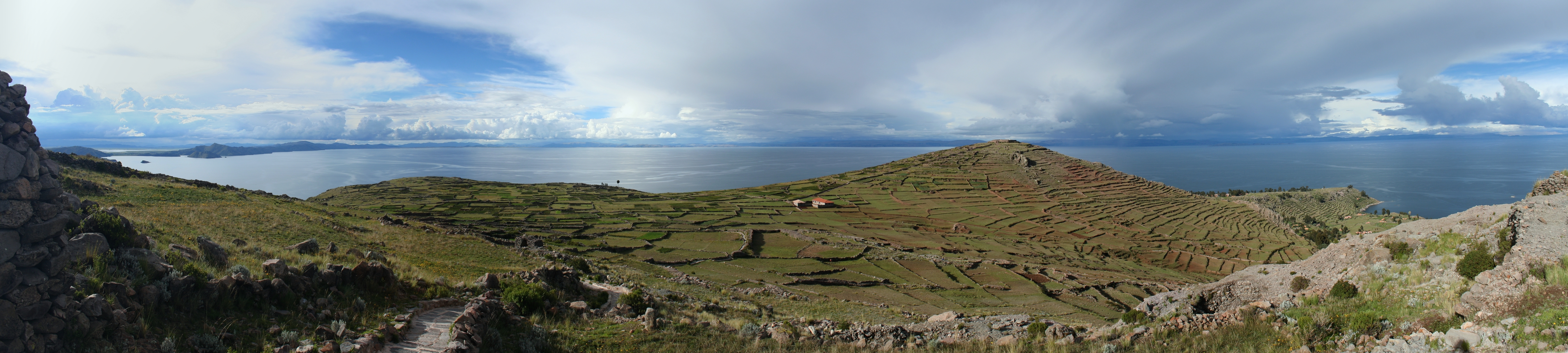
Interior of Amantaní Island from Pachamama

== See also ==
- Taquile Island
- Tikunata

== Sources ==
- Jordi Gascón, Gringos como en sueños: Diferenciación y conflicto campesino en los Andes Peruanos ante el desarrollo del turismo. Lima: Instituto de Estudios Peruanos. ISBN 9972-51-121-9
- CBC - "INKA POWER PLACES, SOLAR INITIATIONS" ISBN 978-9972-9384-5-0 by Mallku Aribalo
