= Pukara (Moquegua) =

Mountain in Peru

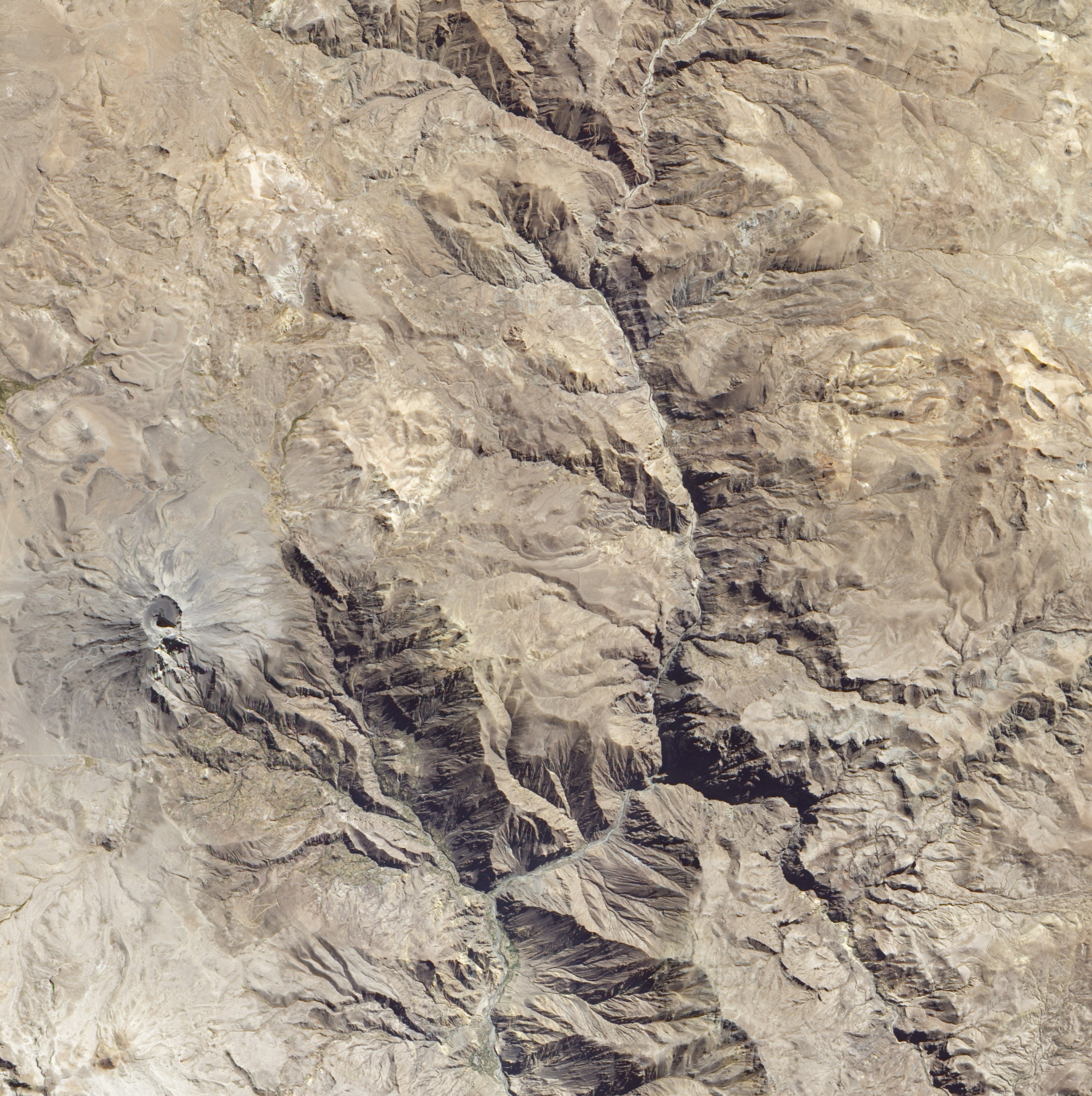
- Satellite image of the volcano Ubinas (on the left) with Pukara northeast of it

Highest point
- Elevation: 4,400 m (14,400 ft)
- Coordinates: 16°20′10″S 70°51′03″W

Geography
- Location within Peru
- Location: Peru, Moquegua Region, General Sánchez Cerro Province
- Parent range: Andes

Pukara (Aymara and Quechua for fortress, Hispanicized spelling Pucara) is a mountain in the Moquegua Region in the Andes of Peru, about 4,400 metres (14,436 ft) high. It is located in the General Sánchez Cerro Province, Ubinas District. Pukara is situated northeast of the active volcano Ubinas and southwest of Wit'uni. The Para River flows along its western slopes.

== See also ==
- Salinas and Aguada Blanca National Reservation
