= Huitoni (mountain) =

Mountain in Peru

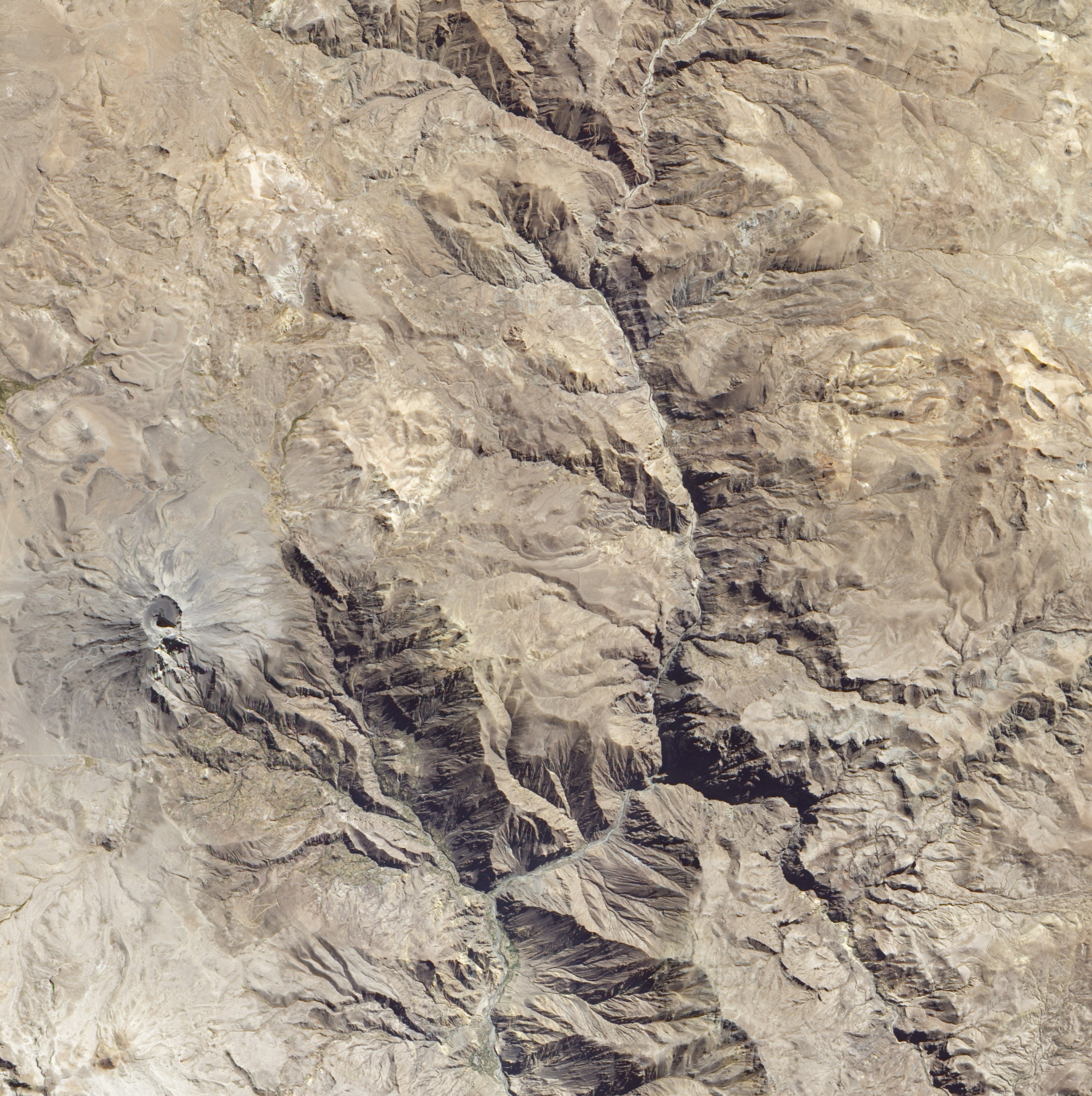
- Satellite image of the volcano Ubinas (on the left) with Huitoni and Pacoorcco northeast of it (light-colored complex)

Highest point
- Elevation: 4,800 m (15,700 ft)
- Coordinates: 16°19′03″S 70°49′32″W

Geography
- Location within Peru
- Location: Peru, Moquegua Region, General Sánchez Cerro Province
- Parent range: Andes

Huitoni or Wit'uni (Aymara wit'u spur, -ni a suffix to indicate ownership, "the one with a spur", Hispanicized spelling Huitoni) is a mountain in the Moquegua Region in the Andes of Peru, about 4,800 metres (15,748 ft) high. It is situated in the General Sánchez Cerro Province, Ubinas District. Huitoni lies northeast of the active volcano Ubinas and southwest of Pirhuane and Pacoorcco.

== See also ==
- Salinas and Aguada Blanca National Reservation
