= Pirhuane (mountain) =

Mountain in Peru

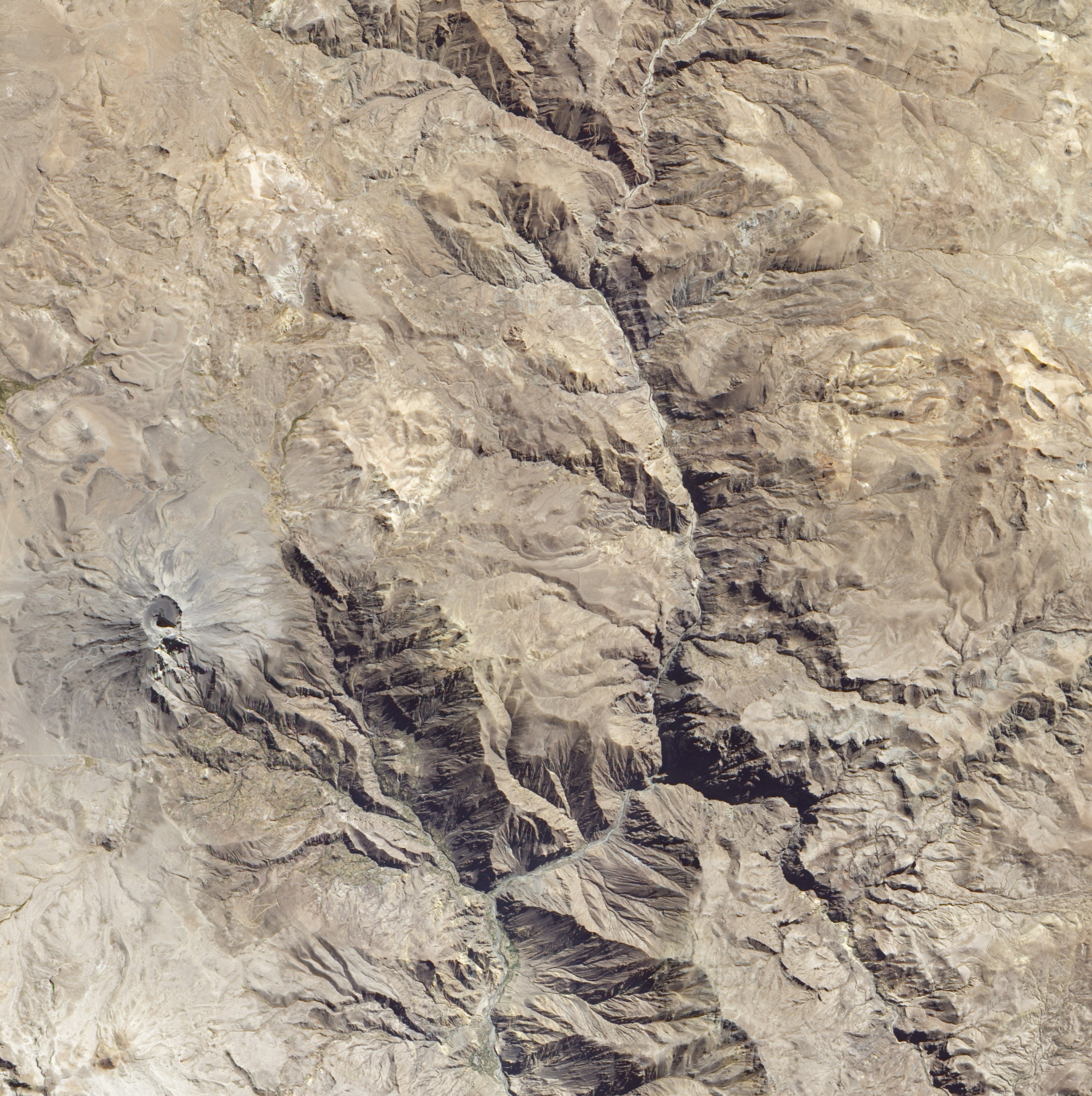
- Satellite image of the volcano Ubinas (on the left), Pacoorcco (the light-colored complex northeast of it) and Pirhuane (north of Pacoorcco)

Highest point
- Elevation: 4,994 m (16,385 ft)
- Coordinates: 16°15′35″S 70°49′25″W

Geography
- Location within Peru
- Location: Peru, Moquegua Region, General Sánchez Cerro Province
- Parent range: Andes

Pirhuane (possibly from Aymara pirwa, piwra granary, -ni a suffix to indicate ownership, "the one with a granary") is a 4,994-metre-high (16,385 ft) mountain in the Moquegua Region in the Andes of Peru. It is situated in the General Sánchez Cerro Province, Ubinas District. Pirwani is situated northeast of the active volcano Ubinas. Like the mountains south of Pirhuane, Pacoorcco and Huitoni, Pirhuane lies on the eastern border of the buffer zone of the Salinas and Aguada Blanca National Reservation.
