= Pukara (Tarucani) =

Mountain in Peru

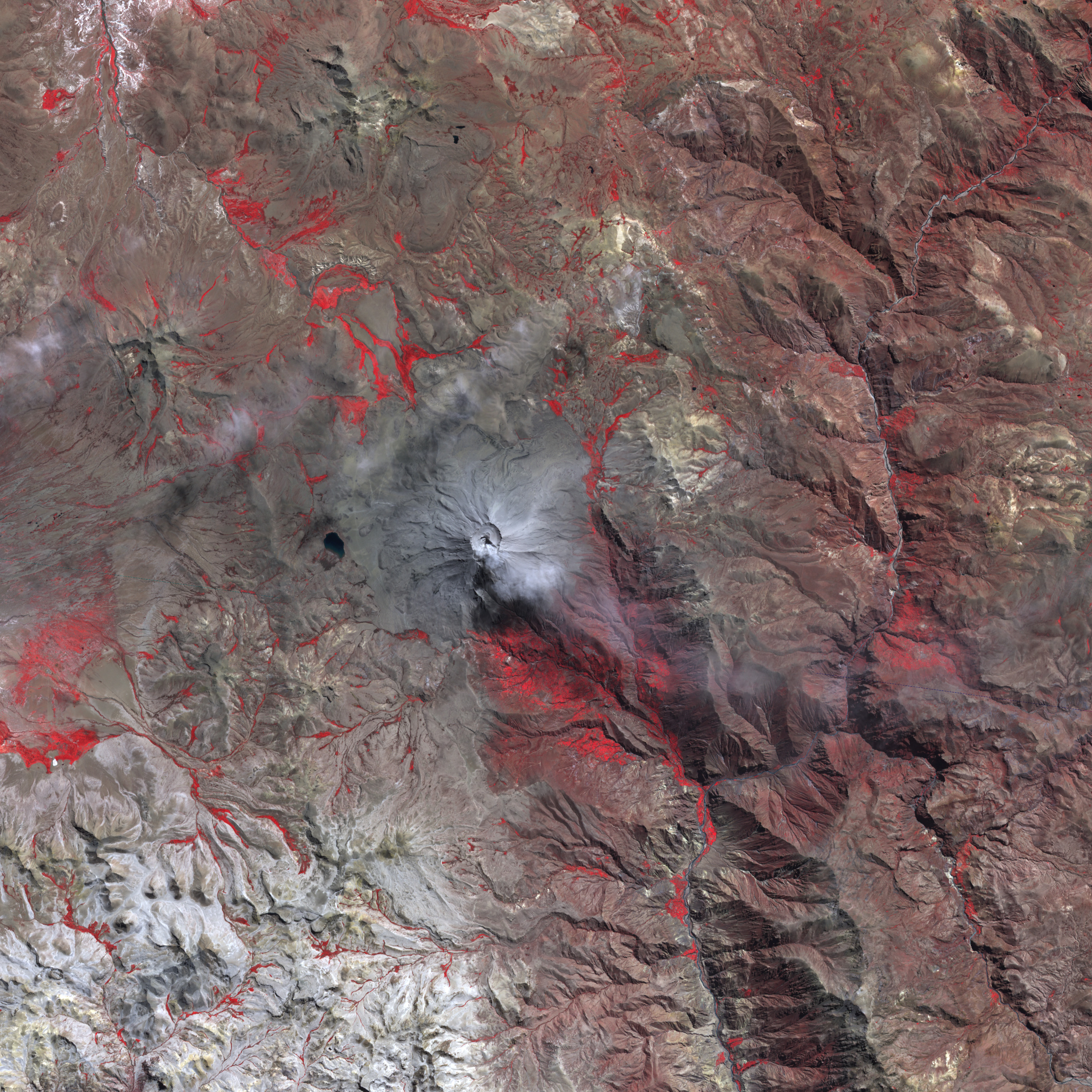
- The Ubinas volcano and Pukara southwest of it (lower left) as seen from above (NASA, 2006)

Highest point
- Elevation: 5,000 m (16,000 ft)
- Coordinates: 16°27′34″S 70°58′44″W

Geography
- Location within Peru
- Location: Peru, Arequipa Region
- Parent range: Andes

Pukara (Aymara and Quechua for fortress, Hispanicized spellings Pucara, Pucará) is a mountain in the Andes of Peru, about 5,000 metres (16,404 ft) high . It is located in the Arequipa Region, Arequipa Province, Tarucani District. Pukara lies north of Wilani and northeast of Qillqata.
