= Phichunchäni =

Mountain in Peru

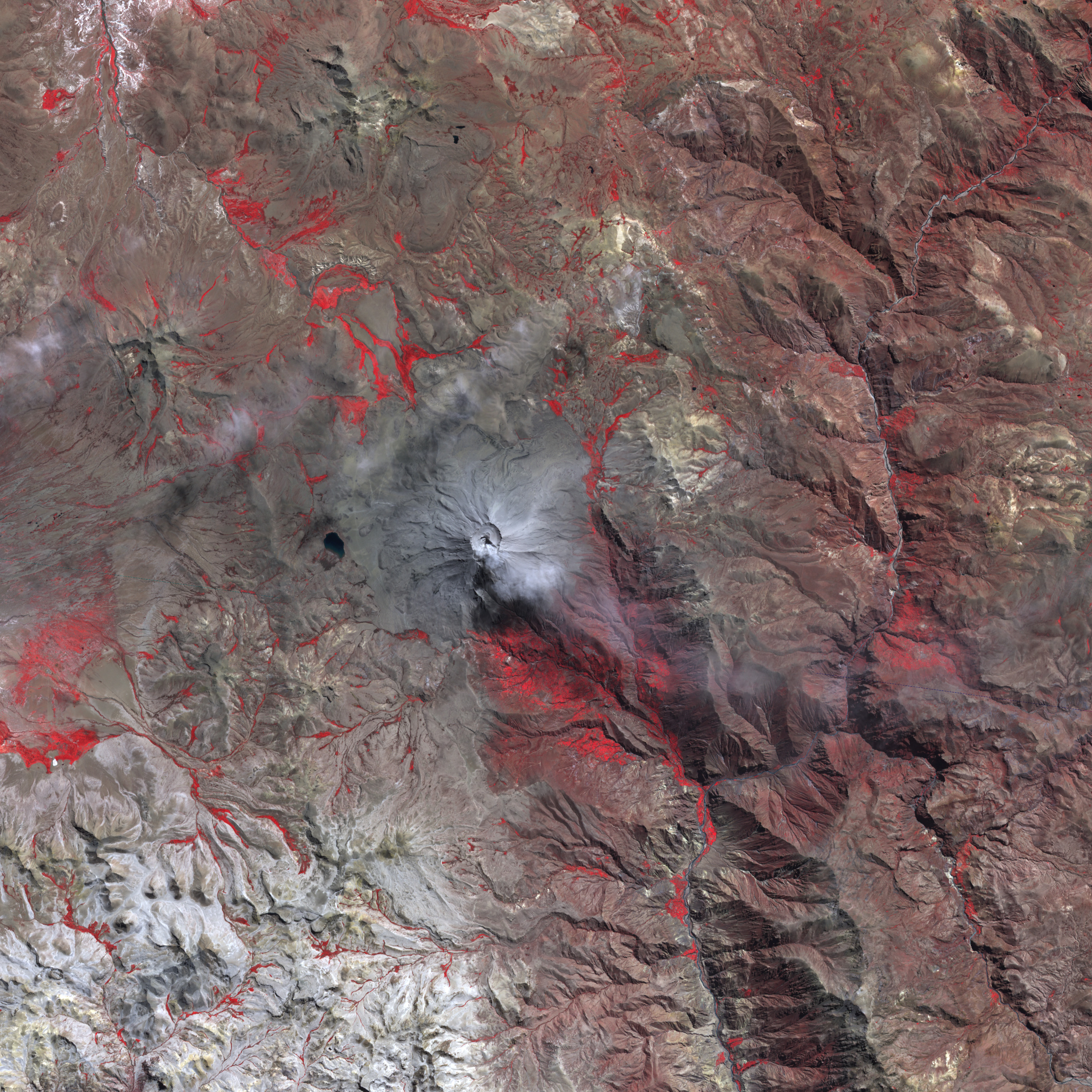
- The Ubinas volcano and Phichunchäni northwest of it as seen from above (NASA, 2006)

Highest point
- Elevation: 5,000 m (16,000 ft)
- Coordinates: 16°16′34″S 71°01′22″W

Geography
- Location within Peru
- Location: Peru, Arequipa Region
- Parent range: Andes

Phichunchäni (Aymara phichunchä a brownish-grey bird (ä stands for a long a), -ni a suffix, "the one with the phichunchä bird", also spelled Pichunchani) is a mountain in the Andes of Peru which reaches a height of approximately 5,000 m (16,000 ft). It is located in the Arequipa Region, Arequipa Province, Tarucani District. Phichunchäni lies northwest of the Ubinas volcano.
