= Chinaqucha (Arequipa) =

Region in Pedro

- Location within Peru
- Location: Peru; Arequipa Region, Arequipa Province
- Coordinates: 16°06′12″S 70°54′45″W

Chinaqucha (Quechua china female, qucha lake, "female lake", also spelled Chinacocha) is a lake in the Arequipa Region in Peru. It is located in the Arequipa Province, Tarucani District. Chinaqucha lies northwest of Urququcha and the mountain named Suri Wasi.
