= Parwayuni =

Mountain in Peru

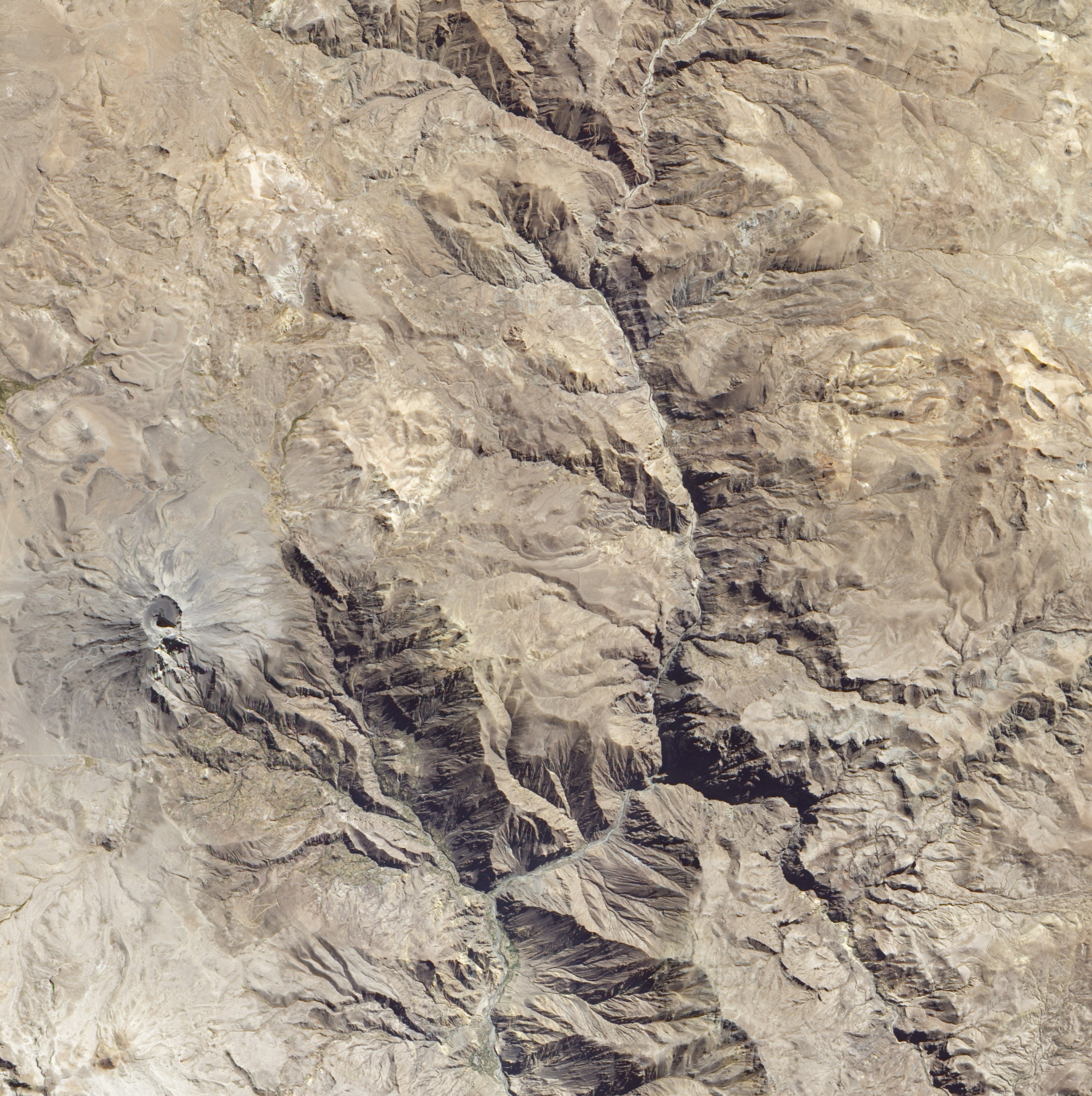
- Satellite image of the volcano Ubinas (on the left) with Parwayuni northwest of it

Highest point
- Elevation: 4,600 m (15,100 ft)
- Coordinates: 16°16′40″S 70°54′03″W

Geography
- Location within Peru
- Location: Peru, Arequipa Region, Moquegua Region
- Parent range: Andes

Parwayuni (Aymara parwayu blossom of cereals, -ni a suffix to indicate ownership, "the one with a cereal blossom (or cereal blossoms)", Hispanicized spelling Parhuayune) is a mountain in the Andes of Peru, about 4,600 metres (15,092 ft) high. It is in the Arequipa Region, Arequipa Province, Tarucani District, and in the Moquegua Region, General Sánchez Cerro Province, Ubinas District. Parwayuni is northwest of the active volcano Ubinas and the 4,647-metre-high (15,246 ft) Qhuyu Parwayuni.
