= Qhuyu Parwayuni =

Mountain in the Andes of Peru

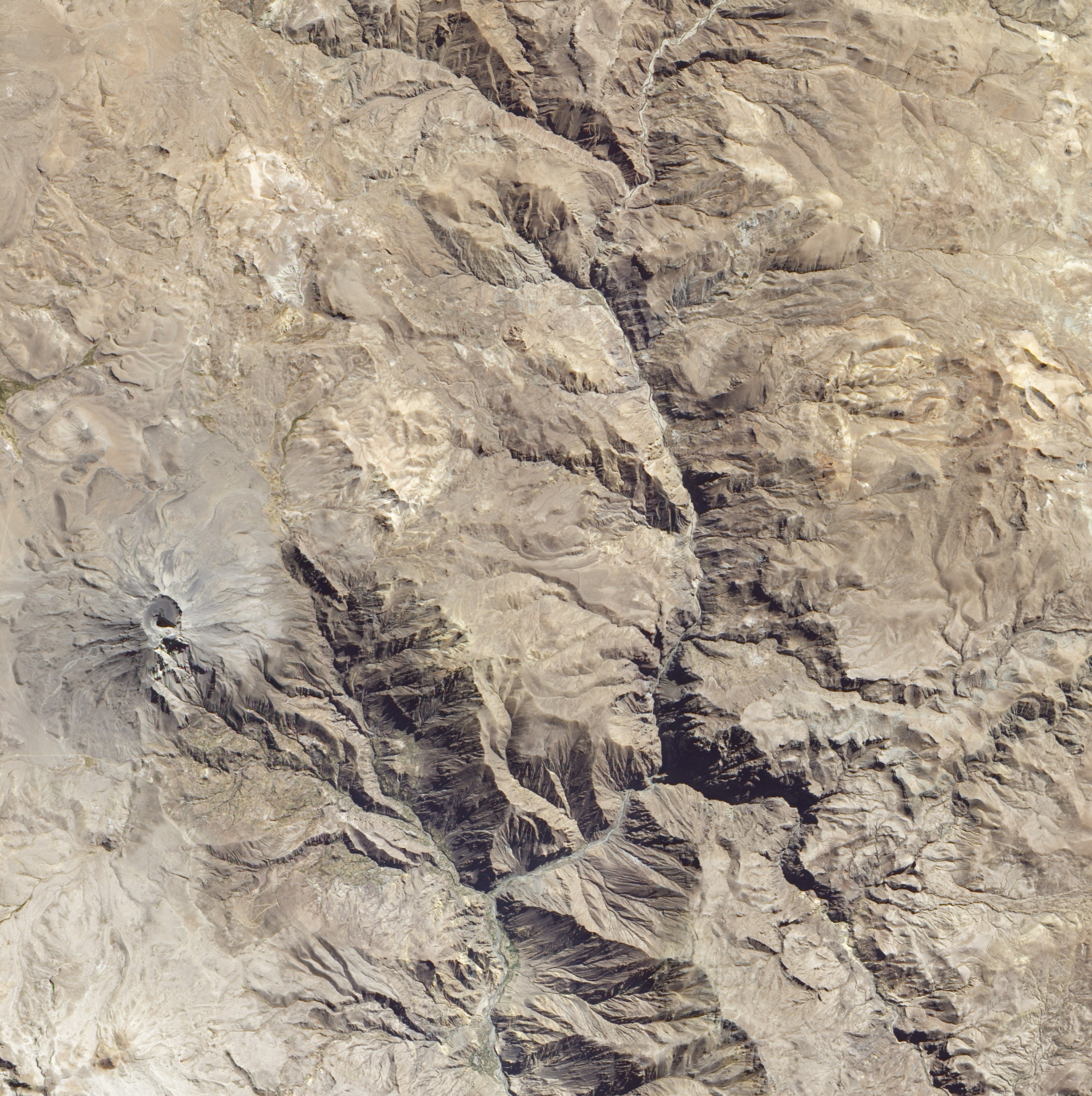
- Satellite image of the Ubinas volcano (on the left) and Qhuyu Parwayuni northwest of it

Highest point
- Elevation: 4,647 m (15,246 ft)
- Coordinates: 16°17′31″S 70°54′17″W

Geography
- Location within Peru
- Location: Peru, Moquegua Region
- Parent range: Andes

Qhuyu Parwayuni (Aymara qhuya, qhuyu mine, parwayu blossom of cereals, -ni a suffix to indicate ownership, Hispanicized spelling Ccuyo Parhuayuni) is a 4,647-metre-high (15,246 ft) mountain in the Andes of Peru. It is located in the Moquegua Region, General Sánchez Cerro Province, Ubinas District. Qhuyu Parwayuni is situated north of the active Ubinas volcano and south of Parwayuni.
