= San Juan de Tarucani District =

Coordinates: 16°10′59″S 71°04′01″W

San Juan de Tarucani Tarujani
- District
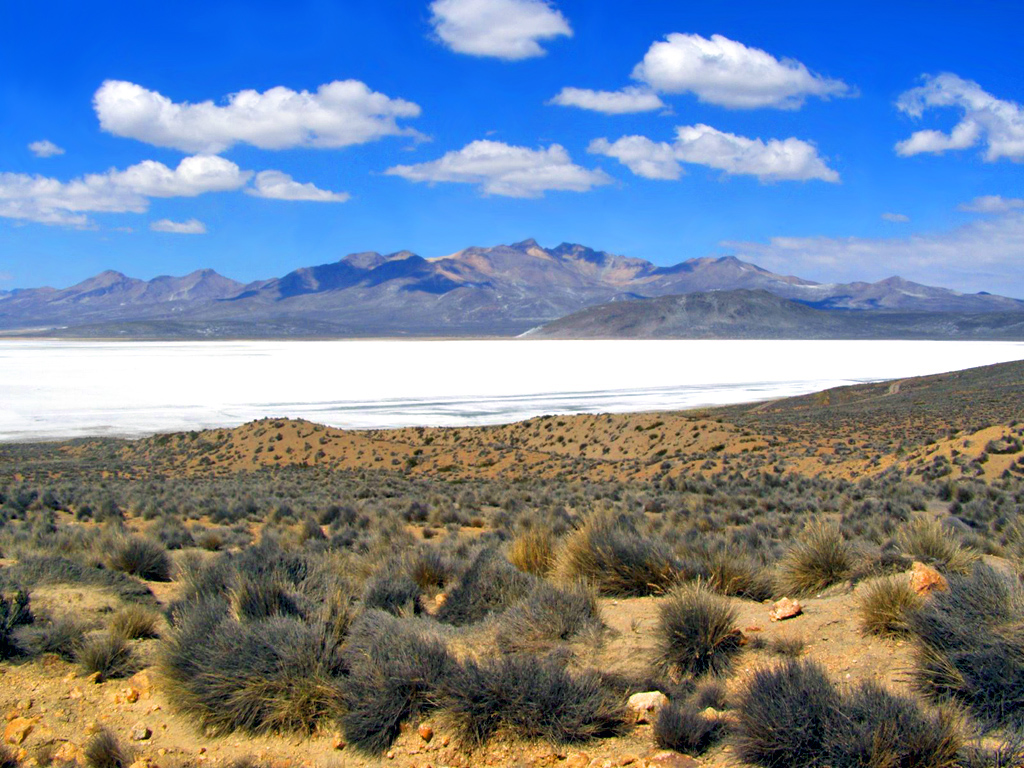
- Lake Salinas, Tarucani District
- Interactive map of San Juan de Tarucani
- Country: Peru
- Region: Arequipa
- Province: Arequipa
- Founded: June 15, 1962
- Capital: Tarucani

Government
  - Mayor: Floro Choque Vilca

Area
  - Total: 2,264.59 km^{2} (874.36 sq mi)
- Elevation: 4,210 m (13,810 ft)

Population (2005 census)
  - Total: 2,296
  - Density: 1.014/km^{2} (2.626/sq mi)
- Time zone: UTC-5 (PET)
- UBIGEO: 040119

San Juan de Tarucani District (Aymara Tarujani, taruja deer, -ni a suffix, "the one with deer") is one of 29 districts of the province Arequipa in Peru.

== Geography ==
The highest elevation of the district is the Misti volcano at 5,822 m (19,101 ft). Other mountains are listed below:

- Anta Q'awa
- Anta Saya
- Chachakumani
- Chawpi Pampa
- Ichhu Muqu
- Iru Chaka
- Iru Qullu
- Janq'u Apachita
- Janq'uri
- Japu Sura
- Jayuni
- Jichu Qullu
- Kinwani
- Kunturi
- Kunturini
- Llallawi
- Llallawani
- Misa Misani
- Misa Pilluni
- Muru Qullu
- Ñuñu Muqu
- Pachakutiq
- Palumani
- Parwayuni
- Pikchu Pikchu
- Pilluni
- Pirwani
- Puka Apachita
- Puka Kancha
- Puka Muqu
- Puka Pukayuq
- Puka Urqu
- Pukara
- Puka Saya
- Phichunchäni
- Qayqu
- Qillqata
- Qiñwani
- Qiwlla Pununa
- Qullpani
- Qullqirani
- Quri Mit'a
- Q'irayuq
- Salla Chaka
- Saywa
- Saywani
- Sinqa
- Sura Wañusqa
- Surallayuq
- Suri Wasi
- Takuni
- Turi Qaqa
- Turini
- T'ula Muqu
- Usqulluni
- Wanqarani
- Wanq'uni
- Wayllani
- Wayra Pata
- Wila Muqu
- Wila Muru Muru
- Wila Wila
- Wilani
- Yana Salla
- Yaritayuq
- Yuraq Pilluni
- Yuraq Urqu

== See also ==
- Chinaqucha
- Lake Salinas
- Salinas and Aguada Blanca National Reservation
- Urququcha
