= Urququcha (Arequipa) =

Lake in Peru

- Location within Peru Location within South America
- Interactive map of Urququcha
- Location: Peru; Arequipa Region, Arequipa Province
- Coordinates: 16°06′32″S 70°54′15″W

Urququcha (Quechua urqu male, qucha lake, "male lake", also spelled Orcococha) is a lake in the Arequipa Region in Peru. It is located in the Arequipa Province, Tarucani District. Urququcha lies southeast of Chinaqucha, northwest of a mountain named Suri Wasi.
