= Jichu Qullu (Tarucani) =

Mountain in Peru

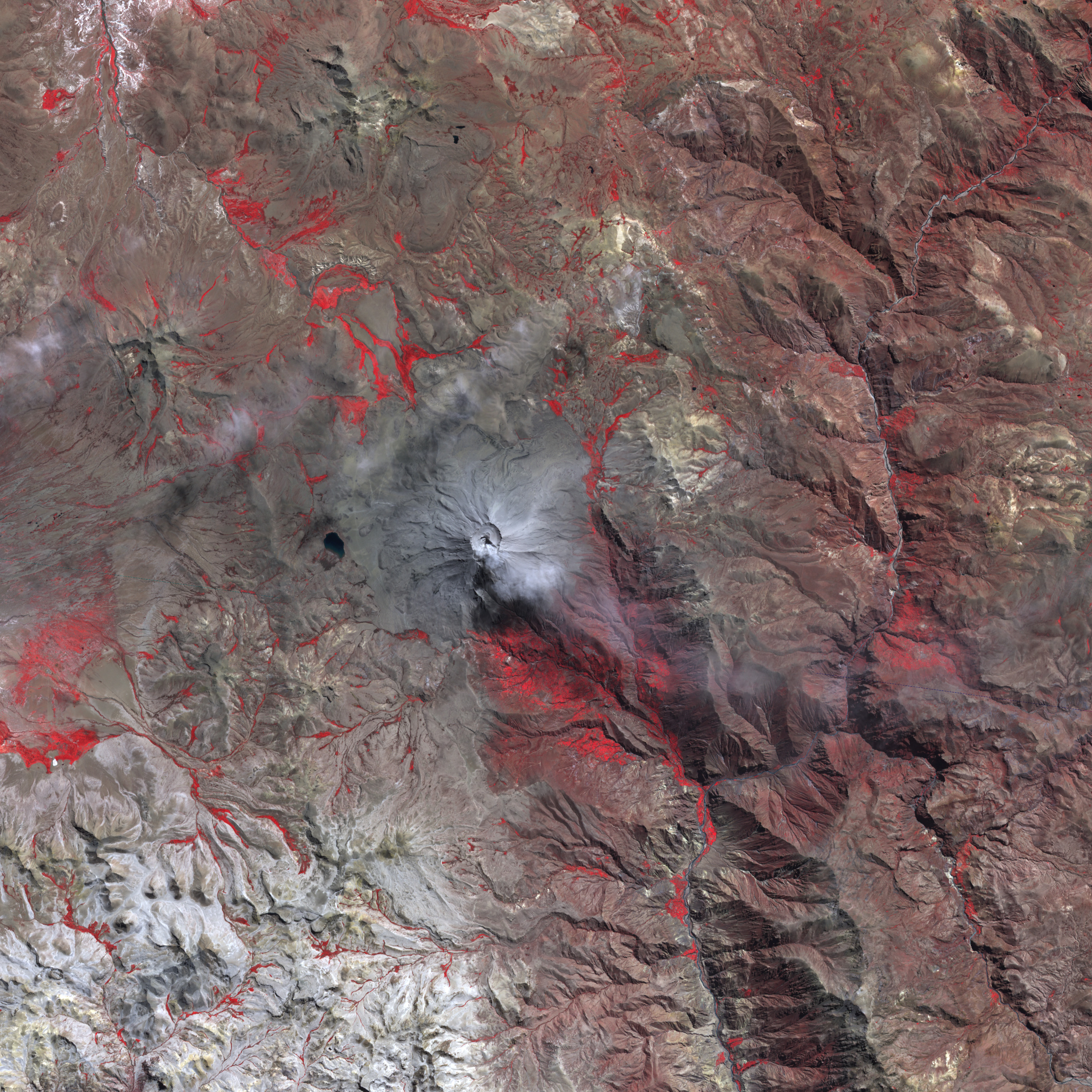
- The Ubinas volcano and Jichu Qullu southwest of it (lower left) as seen from above (NASA, 2006)

Highest point
- Elevation: 4,600 m (15,100 ft)
- Coordinates: 16°25′39″S 70°58′44″W

Naming
- Language of name: Aymara

Geography
- Location within Peru
- Location: Peru, Arequipa Region, Arequipa Province, Tarucani District
- Parent range: Andes

Jichu Qullu (Aymara jichu ichu, Peruvian feather grass, qullu mountain, "ichu mountain", also spelled Ichocollo) is a mountain in the Andes of Peru which reaches a height of approximately 4,600 m (15,100 ft). It is located in the Arequipa Region, Arequipa Province, Tarucani District.
