= Yanaccacca (Moquegua) =

Mountain in Peru

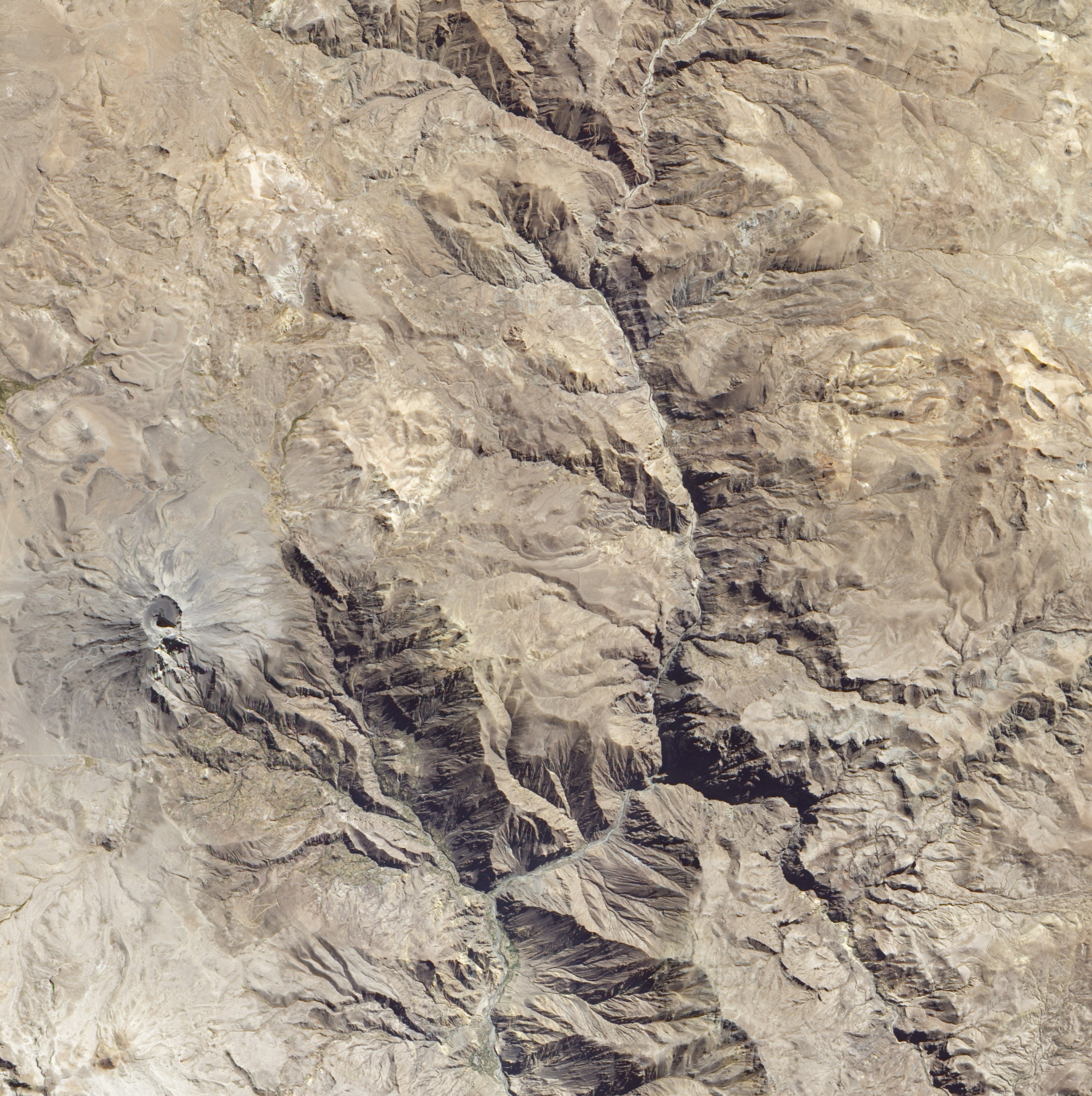
- Satellite image of Ubinas volcano (on the left) and Yanaccacca southeast of it

Highest point
- Elevation: 4,400 m (14,400 ft)
- Coordinates: 16°23′28″S 70°48′43″W

Geography
- Location within Peru
- Location: Peru, Moquegua Region
- Parent range: Andes

Yanaccacca (possibly from Quechua yana black, qaqa rock, "black rock") is a mountain in the Andes of Peru which reaches a height of approximately 4,400 m (14,400 ft). It is located in the Moquegua Region, General Sánchez Cerro Province, on the border of the districts of Matalaque and Ubinas. Yanaccacca lies southeast of the active Ubinas volcano.
