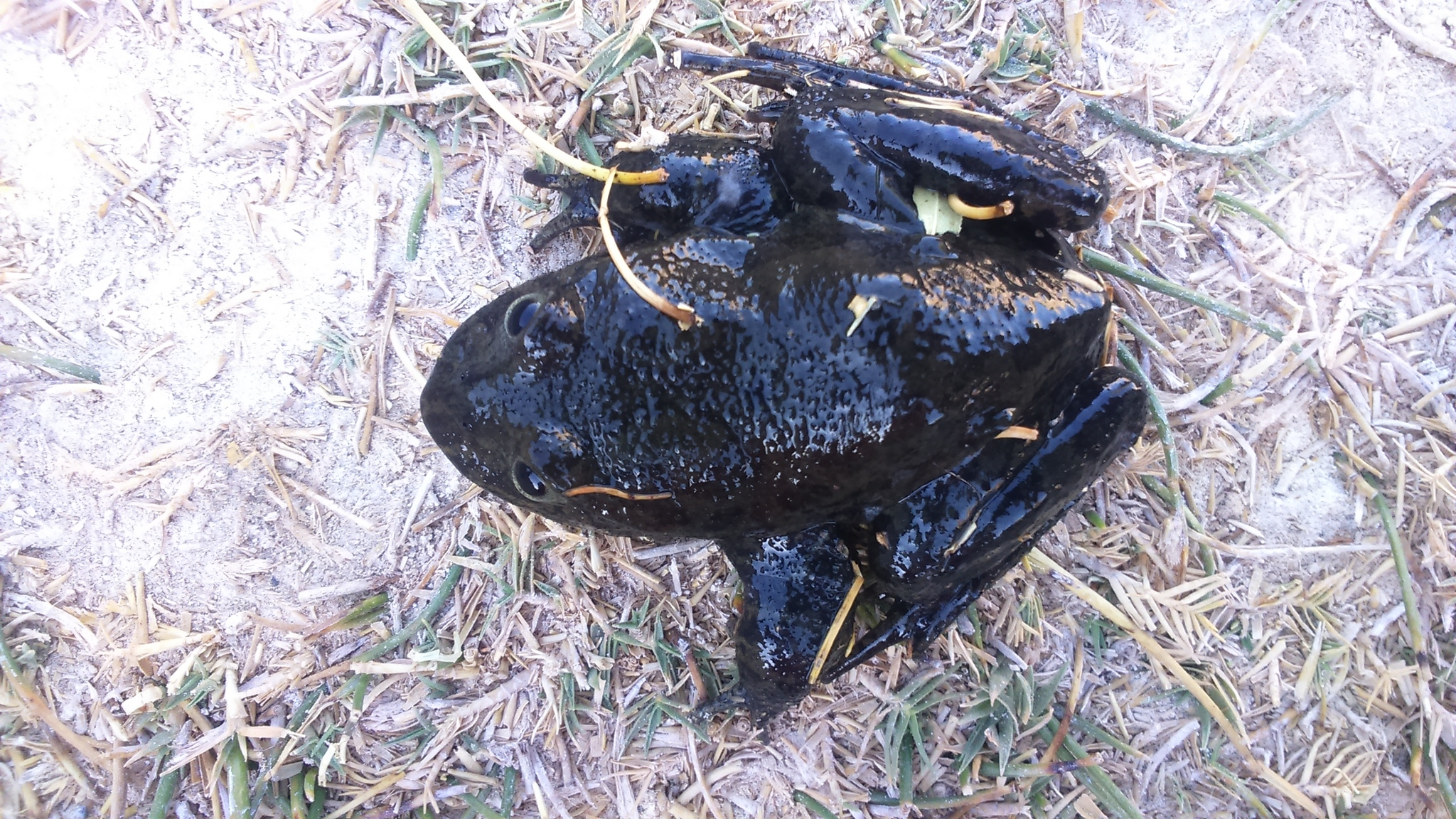

Conservation status
- Near Threatened (IUCN 3.1)

Scientific classification
- Kingdom: Animalia
- Phylum: Chordata
- Class: Amphibia
- Order: Anura
- Family: Telmatobiidae
- Genus: Telmatobius
- Species: T. arequipensis

Binomial name
- Telmatobius arequipensis Vellard, 1955

Synonyms
- Telmatobius arequipensis ssp. natator Vellard, 1955

= Telmatobius arequipensis =

Species of amphibian

Telmatobius arequipensis is a species of frog in the family Telmatobiidae. It is endemic to southern Peru (Arequipa Region, Moquegua Region, and/or Puno Region). It has an altitudinal range of 2,000–4,500 m (6,600–14,800 ft) asl. Two subspecies have been described, Telmatobius arequipensis arequipensis and Telmatobius arequipensis natator. Its common name is Chili water frog, after its type locality near Río Chili.

Telmatobius arequipensis is a riparian semi-aquatic frog. It is present in streams, wet grassland and shrublands, and ditches. It may be found in modified habitats wherever there are streams or ditches. Eggs are laid in the water.

Telmatobius arequipensis is common where it occurs, but populations can be threatened by water pollution. It is also collected for food and traditional medicine. It is present in the Salinas and Aguada Blanca National Reservation. Scientists believe the fungal disease chytridiomycosis may also pose a threat because it has killed other high-altitude frogs in the region.
