= Ubinas District =

Coordinates: 16.3867°S 70.8559°W

Ubinas
- District
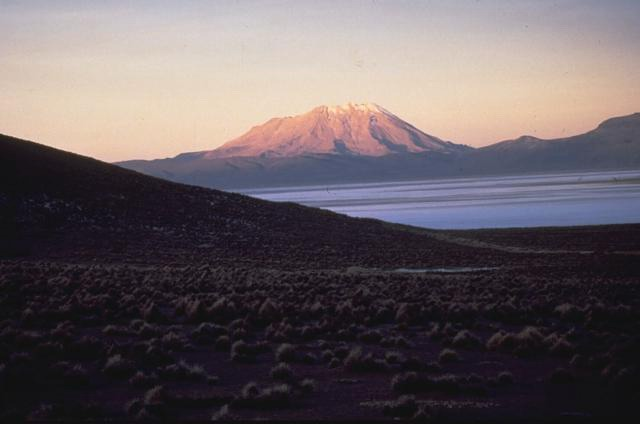
- Ubinas volcano in the Ubinas District
- Interactive map of Ubinas
- Country: Peru
- Region: Moquegua
- Province: General Sánchez Cerro
- Capital: Ubinas

Government
  - Mayor: Angel Americo Quispitupac Soto

Area
  - Total: 874.57 km^{2} (337.67 sq mi)
- Elevation: 3,376 m (11,076 ft)

Population (2005 census)
  - Total: 4,804
  - Density: 5.493/km^{2} (14.23/sq mi)
- Time zone: UTC-5 (PET)
- UBIGEO: 180210

Ubinas District is one of eleven districts of the province General Sánchez Cerro in the Moquegua Region in Peru.

== Geography ==
The highest elevation in the district is the Ubinas volcano. Other mountains are listed below:

- Aqu Q'asa
- Chhuqu
- Hatun Urqu
- Llallawani
- Llallawi
- Llaqtayuq
- Minasniyuq
- Paru Sarayuq
- Parwayuni
- Pilluni
- Pirwani
- Puka Salla
- Pukara
- Puntayuq
- P'aqu Urqu
- Qaqawara
- Qayqu Punta
- Qucha Q'asa
- Qhuyu Parwayuni
- Q'ara Muqu
- Q'illu Q'asa
- Q'irayuq
- Sura Wañusqa
- Suri Wasi
- Ubinas
- Wit'u Pata
- Wit'uni
- Yana Qaqa
- Yuraq Kancha
- Yuraq Muqu
- Yuraq Urqu

== Climate ==
Climate data for Ubinas, elevation 3,381 m (11,093 ft), (1991–2020)
Month	Jan	Feb	Mar	Apr	May	Jun	Jul	Aug	Sep	Oct	Nov	Dec	Year
Mean daily maximum °C (°F)	18.3 (64.9)	17.7 (63.9)	18.3 (64.9)	19.1 (66.4)	18.6 (65.5)	18.1 (64.6)	17.8 (64.0)	18.8 (65.8)	19.4 (66.9)	20.0 (68.0)	20.2 (68.4)	19.7 (67.5)	18.8 (65.9)
Mean daily minimum °C (°F)	6.4 (43.5)	6.5 (43.7)	6.2 (43.2)	4.9 (40.8)	2.6 (36.7)	1.4 (34.5)	1.3 (34.3)	2.2 (36.0)	3.5 (38.3)	4.4 (39.9)	4.5 (40.1)	5.7 (42.3)	4.1 (39.4)
Average precipitation mm (inches)	93.5 (3.68)	100.2 (3.94)	57.6 (2.27)	17.4 (0.69)	2.6 (0.10)	2.0 (0.08)	3.2 (0.13)	2.8 (0.11)	2.9 (0.11)	4.2 (0.17)	5.3 (0.21)	33.2 (1.31)	324.9 (12.8)
Source: National Meteorology and Hydrology Service of Peru
