= Yuraq Urqu (Arequipa-Moquegua) =

Mountain in Peru

- Location within Peru

Highest point
- Elevation: 4,858 m (15,938 ft)
- Coordinates: 16°02′30″S 70°48′27″W

Geography
- Location: Peru, Arequipa Region, Moquegua Region
- Parent range: Andes

Yuraq Urqu (Quechua yuraq white, urqu mountain, "white mountain", also spelled Yurac Orcco) is a 4,858-metre-high (15,938 ft) mountain in the Andes of Peru. It is located in the Arequipa Region, Arequipa Province, Tarucani District, and in the Moquegua Region, General Sánchez Cerro Province, Ubinas District. Yuraq Urqu lies east of Piñani Lake (Peñane).
