= Pacoorcco (Moquegua) =

Mountain in Peru

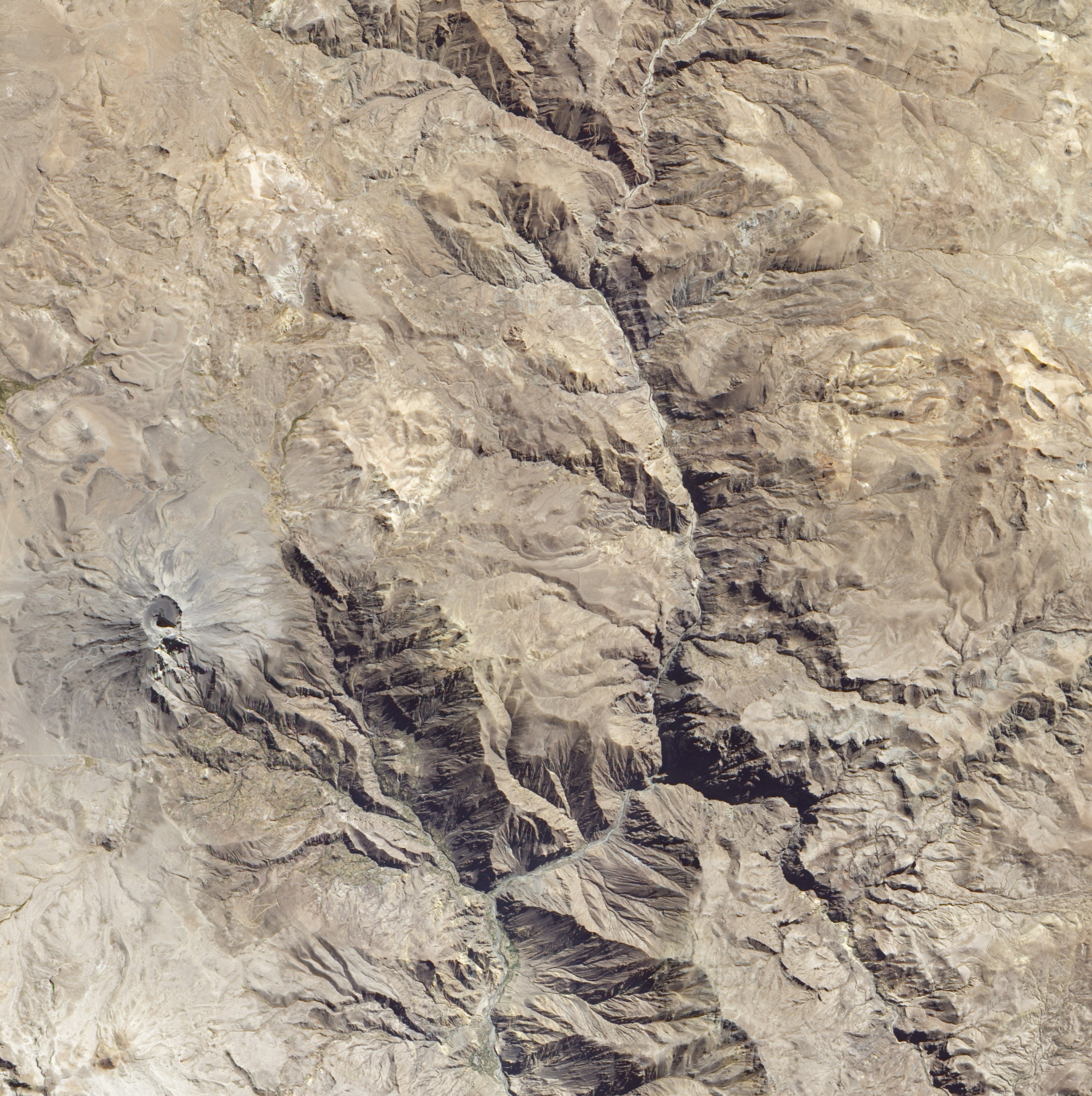
- Satellite image of the volcano Ubinas (on the left), Pacoorcco (the light-colored complex north-east of it) and Pirhuane (north of Pacoorcco)

Highest point
- Elevation: 4,940 m (16,210 ft)
- Coordinates: 16°18′10″S 70°49′2″W

Geography
- Location within Peru
- Location: Peru, Moquegua Region, General Sánchez Cerro Province
- Parent range: Andes

Pacoorcco (possibly from Quechua p'aqu blond, fair, a color similar to gold, urqu mountain, "'blond' or slightly golden mountain") erroneously also Poocoorco, is a 4,940-metre-high (16,207 ft) mountain in the Andes of Peru. The mountain is located in the Moquegua Region, General Sánchez Cerro Province, Ubinas District, north-east of the active volcano Ubinas and south of the mountain Pirhuane.
