= Kunturi (Tarucani) =

Mountain in Peru

- Location within Peru

Highest point
- Elevation: 5,200 m (17,100 ft)
- Coordinates: 16°12′48″S 71°8′50″W

Geography
- Location: Peru, Arequipa Region, Arequipa Province
- Parent range: Andes

Kunturi (Aymara for condor, Hispanicized spelling Condori) is a mountain in the Arequipa Region in the Andes of Peru, about 5,200 metres (17,060 ft) high. It is situated in the Arequipa Province, Tarucani District. Kunturi lies south of the El Fraile dam, between Qiñwani (Quenuani) in the northeast and Pukasaya in the southwest.
