= Puka Saya (Arequipa) =

Mountain in Peru

- Location within Peru

Highest point
- Elevation: 5,000 m (16,000 ft)
- Coordinates: 16°15′15″S 71°12′35.5″W

Geography
- Location: Peru, Arequipa Region, Arequipa Province
- Parent range: Andes

Puka Saya (Quechua puka red, saya slope, "red slope", also spelled Pucasaya) is a mountain in the Arequipa Region in the Andes of Peru, about 5,000 metres (16,404 ft) high. It is situated in the Arequipa Province, Tarucani District, north of Lake Salinas. Puka Saya lies southwest of Kunturi.
