= Suri Wasi =

Mountain in Peru

- Location within Peru

Highest point
- Elevation: 4,875 m (15,994 ft)
- Coordinates: 16°07′18″S 70°52′43″W

Geography
- Location: Peru, Arequipa Region, Moquegua Region
- Parent range: Andes

Suri Wasi (Quechua suri rhea, wasi house, "rhea house", Hispanicized spelling Surihuasi) is a 4,875-metre-high (15,994 ft) mountain in the Andes of Peru. It is located in the Arequipa Region, Arequipa Province, Tarucani District, and in the Moquegua Region, General Sánchez Cerro Province, Ubinas District. Suri Wasi lies southeast of the lakes Chinaqucha and Urququcha.
