= Salinas y Aguada Blanca National Reserve =

Protected area in Peru

Coordinates: 16.1021°S 71.219°W

- IUCN category VI (protected area with sustainable use of natural resources)
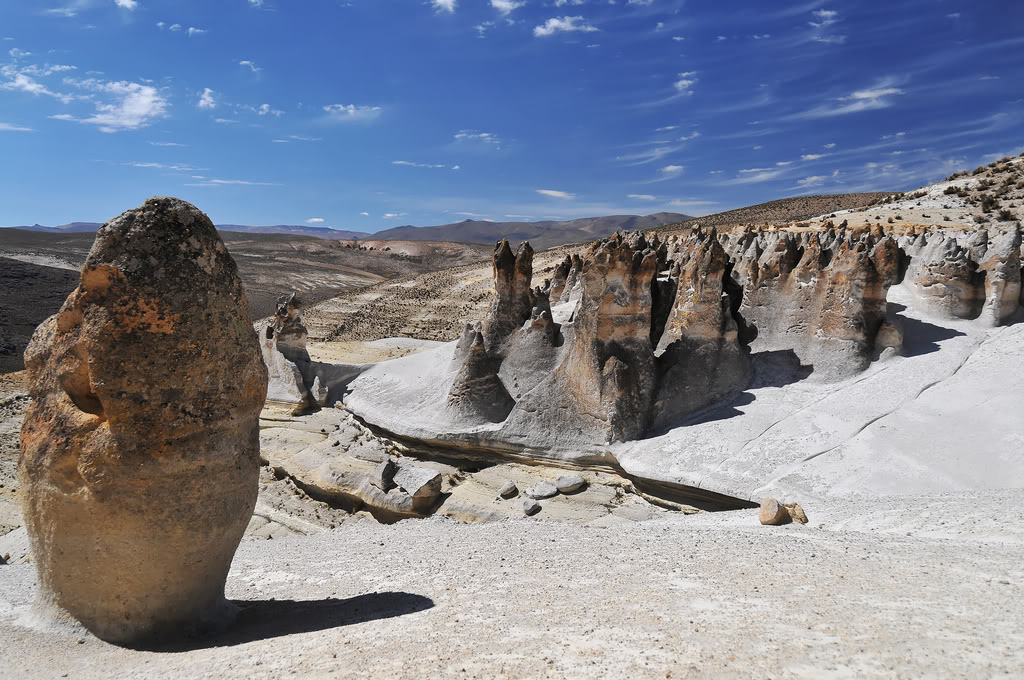
- Rock formations at Salinas y Aguada Blanca National Reserve

- Location of Salinas y Aguada Blanca in Peru
- Interactive map of Salinas y Aguada Blanca National Reserve
- Location: Peru; Arequipa and Moquegua
- Nearest city: Arequipa
- Area: 3,669.36 km^{2} (1,416.75 sq mi)
- Established: 09 August 1979
- Governing body: SERNANP
- Website: Reserva Nacional Salinas y Aguada Blanca

Salinas y Aguada Blanca National Reserve is a protected area located in the regions of Arequipa and Moquegua; Peru. The main purpose of this area is to protect the local flora, fauna and landscape formations.

== History ==
The area was declared a national reserve on 9 August 1979 by decree N° 070-79-AA. Lake Salinas and Lake Del Indio, both located inside the reserve, were designated as Ramsar sites in 2003.

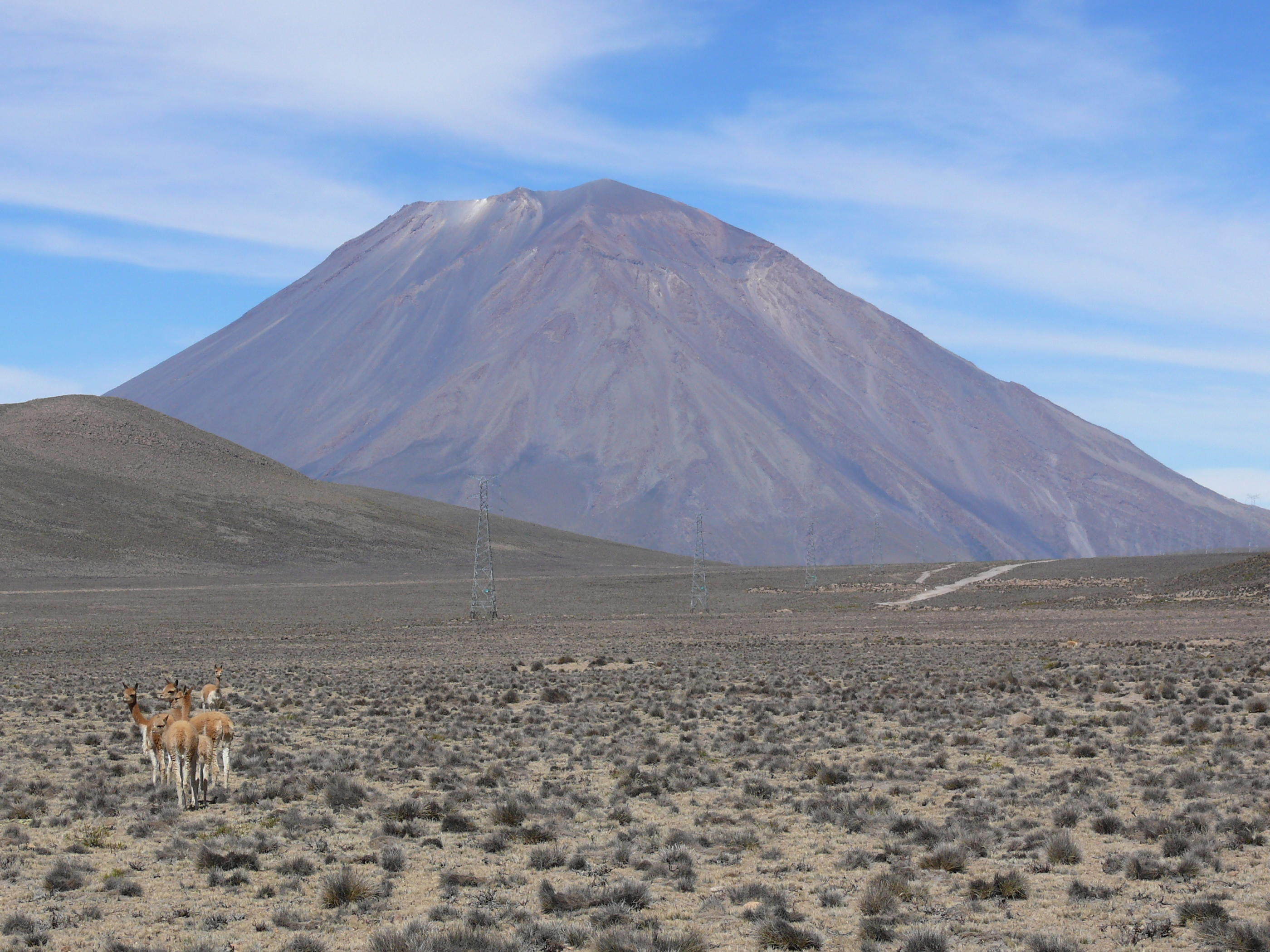
Vicuñas with Misti volcano in the background at Salinas y Aguada Blanca National Reserve.

== Geography ==
Salinas y Aguada Blanca National Reserve is located in the provinces of Caylloma and Arequipa in the region of Arequipa; and a small part in the province of Sanchez Cerro in the region of Moquegua. It spans an area of 366,936 hectares (3,669.36 km^{2}) which covers the headwaters of important local rivers like Yura and Chili.

The landscape features high Andean plateaus dotted by lakes and meadows; and surrounded by volcanoes like Ubinas, Misti, Pichu Pichu and Chachani in the southwest and by mounts Chuccura and Huarancante in the north. Although initially declared an area with the aim to protect local camelids, flamingoes and Andean forests, it has since become a protected water source for the city of Arequipa. Precipitation carried by the eastern winds is captured by the local vegetation and stored in the lakes, meadows and soil; thus giving a valuable environmental service to the region.

The reserve is populated to some extent; most of its territory belongs to thirteen peasant communities and more than 100 private smallholders recognized by law.

== Ecology ==
The area is representative of the puna ecosystem.

=== Flora ===
A total of 358 plant species in 155 genera and 47 families have been found in the area, mostly shrubs and herbs; only one species is a tree (Polylepis sp.) which forms pure stands. Some plants found in the reserve are: Jarava ichu, Nassella depauperata, Lepidophyllum quadrangulare, Parastrephia lepidophylla, Festuca ortophylla, Nassella mexicana, Azorella compacta, Pycnophyllum molle, Werneria paposa, Calamagrostis curvula, Baccharis buxifolia, Alchemilla pinnata, Distichia muscoides, Ranunculus flagelliformis, Myrosmodes sp., among others.

=== Fauna ===
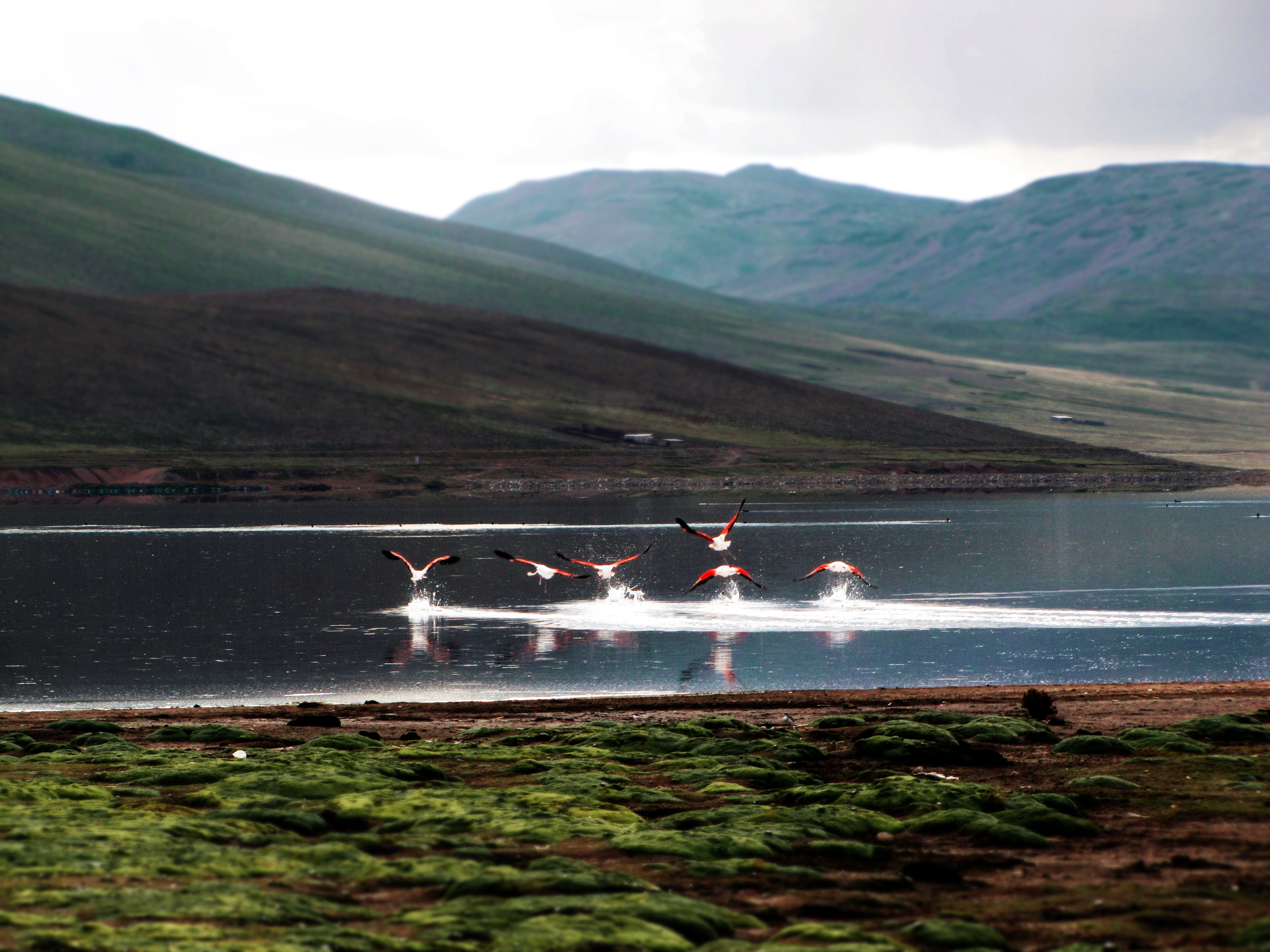
Flamingoes at Salinas y Aguada Blanca National Reserve.

Some mammals native to the reserve are: the llama, the alpaca, the vicuña, the guanaco, the taruca, the vizcacha, the puma, the Andean mountain cat, the colocolo and the Andean fox.

Among the birds native to the reserve are: the Andean goose, the crested duck, the Andean flamingo, James's flamingo, the Tamarugo conebill, the silvery grebe and the giant coot.

Two threatened species of amphibians, Telmatobius arequipensis and Rhinella spinulosa, inhabit the reserve.

== Activities ==
Biking and trekking can be done in the numerous paths inside the reserve, while enjoying the landscape emmarked by the volcanoes of the area where mountaineering can be practiced. It is possible to visit volcanic and geothermal land features like the Chucura volcanic crater and the Umalaso hot springs.
