= Ubinas =

Volcano in southern Peru

- Uvillas or Uvinas
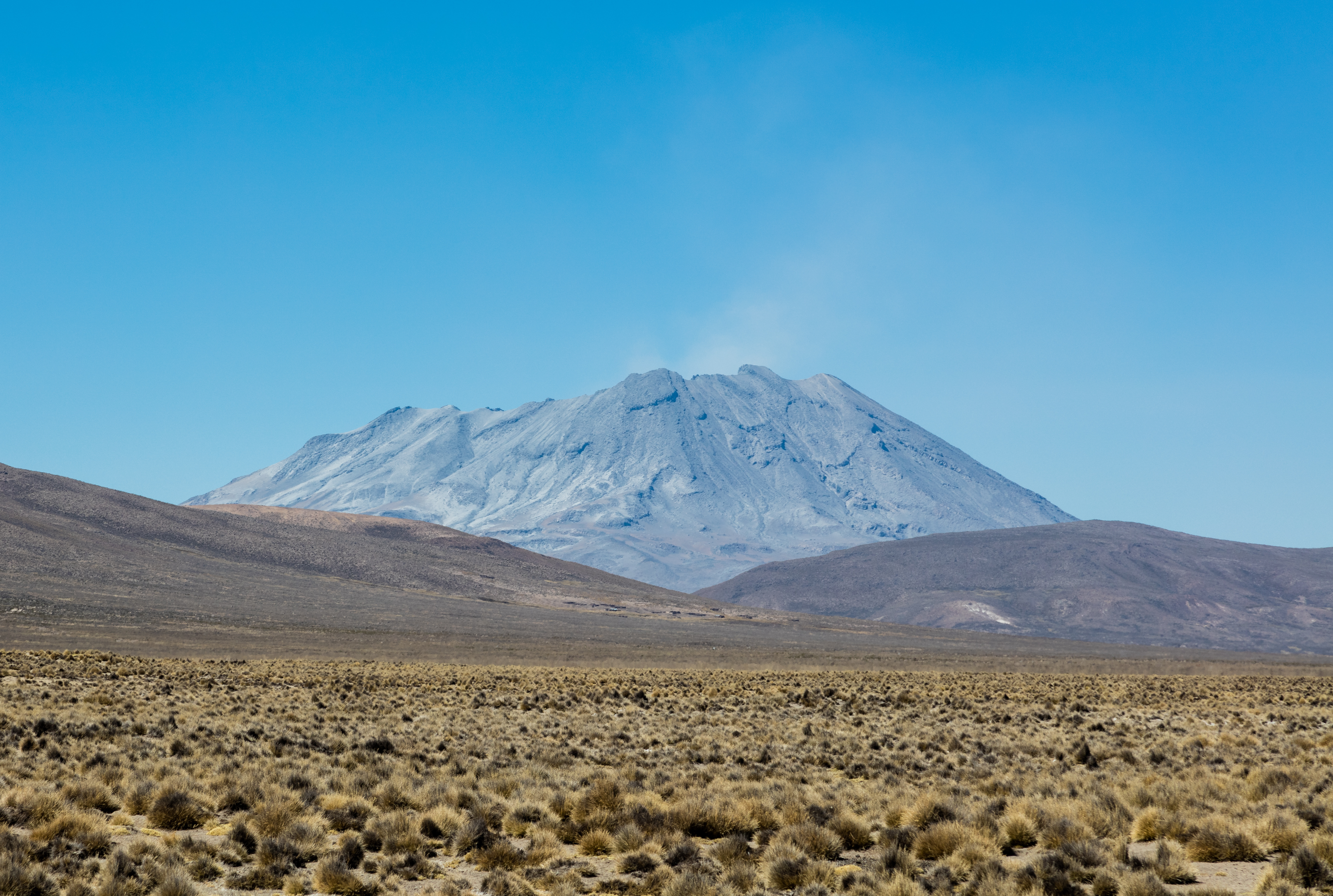
- Ubinas in August 2015

Highest point
- Elevation: 5,672 m (18,609 ft)
- Listing: Volcanoes of Peru
- Coordinates: 16°20′55″S 70°54′08″W

Naming
- English translation: Quechua: "to stuff", "to fill", "to grow", "to increase"; Aymara: "to weep", "to murmur"
- Language of name: Quechua or Aymara

Geography
- Location within Peru
- Country: Peru
- Region: Moquegua
- Province: General Sánchez Cerro
- District: Ubinas
- Parent range: Peruvian Western Cordillera, Andes

Geology
- Rock age: Pleistocene-recent
- Mountain type: Andesitic-dacitic stratovolcano
- Volcanic belt: Central Volcanic Zone
- Last eruption: June 2023

Climbing
- First ascent: Unknown

Ubinas is an active stratovolcano in the Moquegua Region of southern Peru, approximately 60 kilometres (37 mi) east of the city of Arequipa. Part of the Central Volcanic Zone of the Andes, it rises 5,672 metres (18,609 ft) above sea level. The volcano's summit is cut by a 1.4-kilometre-wide (0.87 mi) and 150-metre-deep (490 ft) caldera, which itself contains a smaller crater. Below the summit, Ubinas has the shape of an upwards-steepening cone with a prominent notch on the southern side. The gently sloping lower part of the volcano is also known as Ubinas I and the steeper upper part as Ubinas II; they represent different stages in the volcano's geological history.

The most active volcano in Peru, Ubinas has a history of small to moderate explosive eruptions as well as a few larger eruptions, such as in 1667, along with persistent degassing and ash emissions. Activity at the volcano began in the Pleistocene epoch, and led to the growth of the current mountain in two phases. Among the recent eruptions was the 2006–2007 event, which produced eruption columns and led to ash fall in the region, resulting in health issues and evacuations. During the most recent activity, from 2013 to 2017, a lava flow formed inside the crater, and further ash falls led to renewed evacuations of surrounding towns. Ubinas is monitored by the Peruvian geological service INGEMMET, which has published a volcano hazard map for Ubinas and regular volcanic activity reports.

== Name and mythology ==
The historian and geographer Mariano Felipe Paz Soldán relates the name Ubinas to two terms in two different languages. In the indigenous language Quechua, uina means "to stuff" or "to fill", and uiña is translated as "to grow" or "to increase". In Aymara, hupi means "weep" or "murmur"; hupina is the genitive of hupi. Local inhabitants believed that Ubinas was infested by demons and the souls of people who had fallen from God. The volcano is also known as Uvillas or Uvinas.

== Geography and structure ==
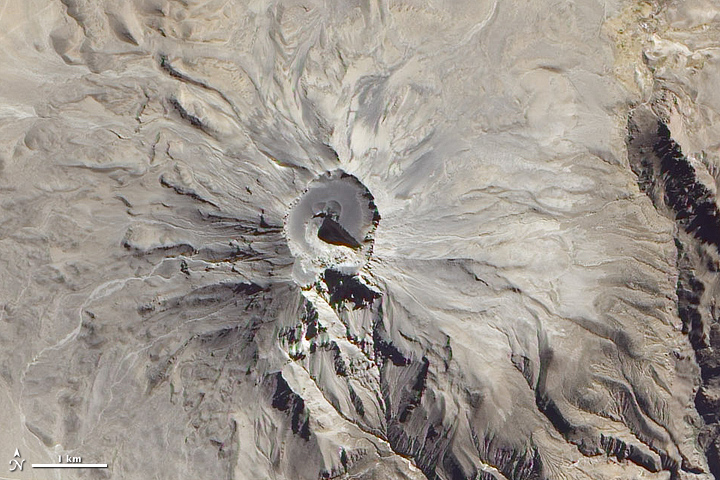
Ubinas caldera from above, with the crater and the notch in the southern rim clearly visible

Ubinas lies in the Ubinas District of the General Sánchez Cerro Province, Moquegua Region of Peru, 60 kilometres (37 mi) east of Arequipa in the Peruvian Western Cordillera.

Like other Peruvian volcanoes, Ubinas belongs to the Central Volcanic Zone of the Andes. The Central Volcanic Zone is one of four volcanic belts in the Andes; the others are the Northern Volcanic Zone, the Southern Volcanic Zone, and the Austral Volcanic Zone. The Central Volcanic Zone is 1,500 kilometres (930 mi) long, and 69 of its volcanoes have been active in the Holocene epoch.

Peruvian volcanoes include stratovolcanoes, which are typically active for less than 500,000 years, long-lived clusters of lava domes, and monogenetic volcanic fields. Historical eruptions have been recorded at seven Peruvian volcanoes: El Misti, Huaynaputina, Sabancaya, Ticsani, Tutupaca, Ubinas, and Yucamane. The volcanoes Ampato, Casiri, Chachani, Coropuna, and Sara Sara are dormant.

Reaching an elevation of 5,672 metres (18,609 ft), Ubinas is a conical, truncated stratovolcano with upper slopes that reach angles of up to 45 degrees, and more gently sloping lower flanks. The more gently sloping lower part of the volcano is also known as Ubinas I and the steeper upper part as Ubinas II. The southern flank is cut by a noticeable notch, which is probably not an eruption vent and may have been formed by mudflows and rockslides. Due to weathering, the upper sector of the volcano has a worn appearance. Glacial valleys such as the Ubinas and Para valleys, as well as cirques and moraines down to 4,000 metres (13,000 ft) and at the foot of the volcano, indicate that glaciers developed on Ubinas during the Last Glacial Maximum. Other volcanic cones in the region all show heavy erosion by glaciation.

The volcano rises 1.4 kilometres (0.87 mi) from a 65-square-kilometre (25 sq mi) circular surface at the margin of a high plateau. Volcanic ash and some lava flows cover the terrain north and east of Ubinas. Four lava domes crop out around the volcano and may be related to it. The Ubinas and Para valleys border the volcano in its southeastern sector; the difference in elevation between the floor of the Ubinas valley and the plateau is about 2 kilometres (1.2 mi). The total volume of the mountain is estimated to be about 56 cubic kilometres (13 cu mi).

The summit of the volcano is an elliptical caldera 1.4 kilometres (0.87 mi) wide and 150 metres (490 ft) deep, formed by collapses of the summit and explosive eruptions. The caldera walls are made of lava flows bearing traces of hydrothermal alteration; the caldera floor is covered by lava flows and pyroclastic debris from explosive eruptions. It contains one or two ash cones with a triangle-shaped crater 400 metres (1,300 ft) wide and 300 metres (980 ft) deep; its walls are fractured and hydrothermally altered. Geophysical surveys have indicated the presence of an even larger buried caldera in Ubinas.

A debris avalanche on the southeastern flank reached a distance of 10 kilometres (6.2 mi) from the volcano, and left a collapse scar that is drained by the Volcanmayo River. This collapse took place early in the history of the volcano and removed a volume of about 2.8 cubic kilometres (0.67 cu mi) of rock from the mountain and underlying basement. Further collapses have occurred throughout the history of the volcano and into the Holocene epoch, including one 1-cubic-kilometre (0.24 cu mi) collapse that left a hummocky deposit on the southern flank. The sloping terrain that Ubinas is built upon predisposes the mountain to south-directed landslides; future collapses in that direction are possible, with the heavily fractured southern flank of the caldera particularly at risk.

=== Hydrology and human geography ===
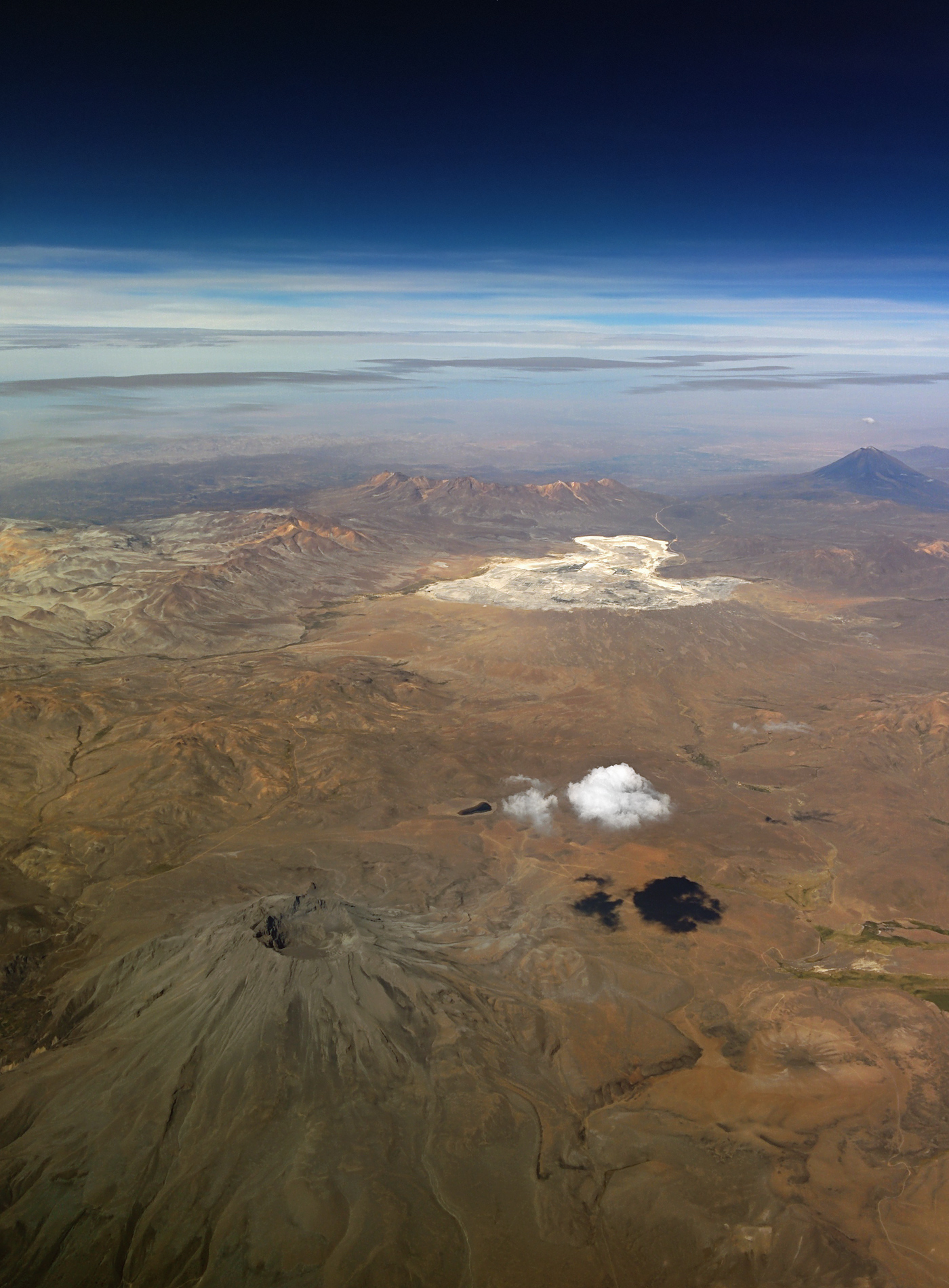
Ubinas (front) and El Misti (background)

In the 1970s, an ephemeral crater lake appeared in the crater after wet seasons; another lake formed in 2016 after the crater floor was covered by the ongoing eruptions with impermeable material. Acid springs occur in the crater, and their water is capable of corroding silicon after a few hours' exposure. Lake Piscococha is located on the volcano's western foot and during December–April receives meltwater from its slopes, while the Para River and Sacuaya River flow past its eastern and southern slopes, respectively. Other rivers on the slopes of Ubinas are the Quebrada Infiernillo on the southeastern, Volcanmayo River on the southern and Quebrada Postcone on the southwestern flank. The Sacuaya River becomes the Ubinas River and after confluence with the Para ends in the Tambo River which eventually flows into the Pacific Ocean; the Ubinas River valley is densely inhabited.

Ubinas lies in the Salinas y Aguada Blanca National Reserve of Peru, which was founded in 1979. The town of Ubinas and the villages of Querapi, Tonohaya, Ubinas and Viscachani lie southeast, south, southeast and northwest of the volcano, respectively, and other villages in the area include Anascapa, Escacha, Huarina, Huatahua, Sacuaya, San Miguel and Tonohaya. In total about 5,000 people live within 12 kilometres (7.5 mi) from the volcano, with Querapi being only 4 kilometres (2.5 mi) away from Ubinas and thus the closest town to it. Agriculture and animal husbandry are the most important economic activities in these towns, agriculture prevailing at lower elevations. Water reservoirs and mining projects also exist in the wider region. Paved roads run along the northern and southern-southwestern foot of Ubinas, connecting towns close to the volcano to Arequipa and allowing access to the volcano over its western flank.

== Geology ==
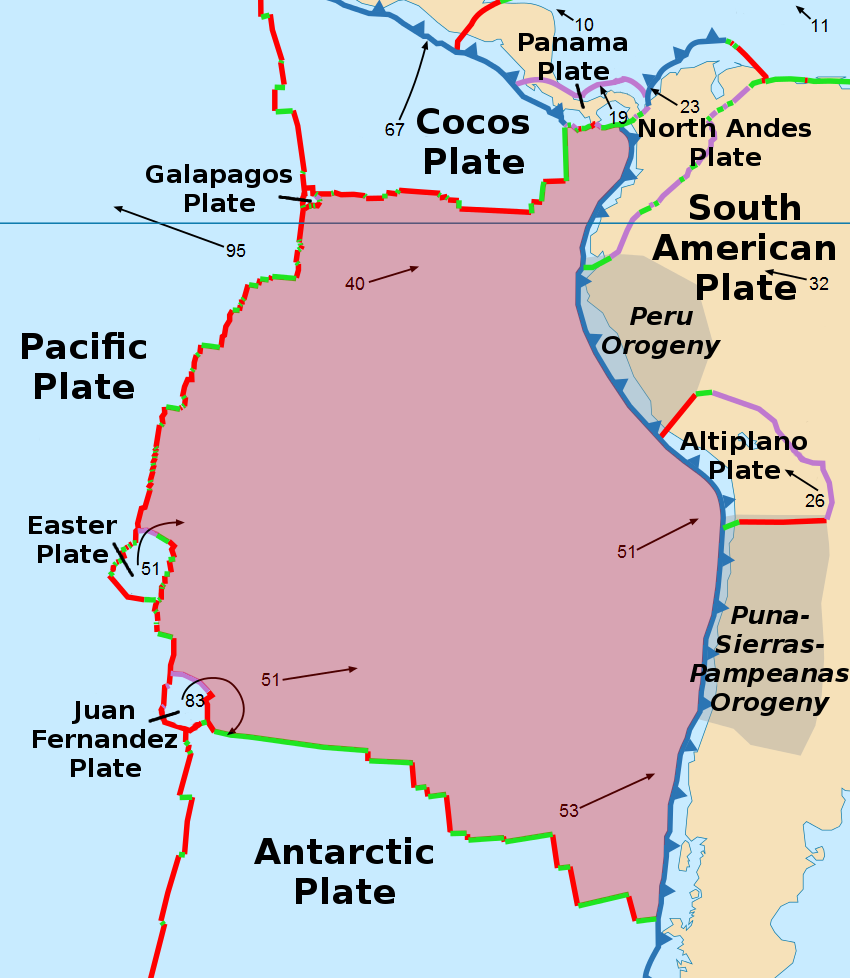
Map of the Nazca Plate and adjacent regional blocks of South America

Off the western coast of South America, the Nazca Plate subducts beneath the South American Plate at a rate of 7–9 centimetres per year (2.8–3.5 in/year) in the Peru-Chile Trench. This subduction process is responsible for the formation of the Andes and the Altiplano-Puna plateau within the last 25 million years, as well as for volcanism and earthquakes. The magma erupted by the volcanoes is formed by the partial melting of the mantle after fluids originating in the downgoing slab have altered the mantle; the magmas often undergo fractional crystallization and absorb crustal material.

Southern Peru has been affected by volcanic activity since the Ordovician and the Permian-Jurassic period, subduction-related volcanism becoming important from the Cretaceous onwards. Beginning 91 million years ago, several volcanic arcs have been active in southern Peru: from the Toquepala arc 91 – c. 45 million years ago over the Andahuaylas-Anta c. 45–30 million years ago, the Huaylillas 24–10 million years ago, the two Barroso arcs 10–1 million years ago, to the recent arc in the last million years. The switching between the volcanic arcs was accompanied by northeastward or southwestward shifts of the zone of main volcanic activity. Furthermore, there was little relief in the region before about 45 million years ago when major uplift commenced.

=== Local setting ===
Ubinas, Ticsani and Huaynaputina form a group of volcanoes that extend in north-south direction north of the chain of volcanoes that make up the rest of the Central Volcanic Zone. These volcanoes have erupted rocks with similar geochemical traits and they are located around a graben occupied by the Rio Tambo; the marginal faults of this graben are the sites of the volcanic vents and probably acted as magma conduits. The magmas erupted by all three volcanoes appear to originate in a common magma chamber at 20–35 kilometres (12–22 mi) depth, with seismic activity localized along the margins of the chamber. Aside from this deep reservoir, Ubinas also has a shallower magma chamber at 4–7 kilometres (2.5–4.3 mi) depth which appears to have a small size. An underground magmatic connection between Ubinas and Huaynaputina was postulated already by Antonio Vázquez de Espinosa after the 1600 eruption of the latter volcano, which was the largest historical eruption in the Andes and had an enormous impact, including causing a cold summer in the northern hemisphere.

The basement of Ubinas consists of volcanic and sedimentary rocks. The sedimentary rocks include the Jurassic Chocholate Formation, the Socosani Formation and the Yura Group. The oldest volcanic rocks of the Matalaque Volcanics date to the Late Cretaceous and crop out east and southeast of Ubinas, far away from the volcano. Most of the volcanics in proximity to Ubinas are the younger, Eocene-to-Oligocene Tacaza Group and the more restricted Miocene-Pliocene Barroso Group, which directly underlies the Ubinas mountain. Even older basement rocks include Paleoproterozoic plutons and the sedimentary Yura Group of Jurassic to Cretaceous age. A depression, whose margin is cut by landslide scars, cuts into the basement southeast of Ubinas and contains the Ubinas valley. Faults cut across the volcano and create unstable areas, especially in its southern sector, and NNW-SSE trending geological lineaments have influenced the stability and the hydrothermal system of Ubinas.

=== Composition ===
Andesite and dacite are the dominant components of the volcano, though its rocks have compositions ranging from basaltic andesite to rhyolite. The volcanic rocks form a potassium-rich calc-alkaline suite. Phenocryst minerals vary between volcanic rocks of different composition and include amphibole, apatite, biotite, clinopyroxene, iron-titanium oxides, olivine, orthopyroxene, plagioclase and zircon. Assimilation of crustal material and fractional crystallization are involved in the genesis of this magma suite.

Lava composition has changed over time, dacites being represented mainly during the Ubinas II stage while stage I yielded mostly andesites. Silica content has decreased over time, with two phases of more silicic eruptions in the mid- and late Holocene. Holocene explosive eruptions were fed by silicic magma chambers that are now inactive as basaltic andesite is the major product of historical eruptions. There is a trend for more recent volcanic events to produce more diverse rocks than the early eruptions, probably owing to a change in the magma supply regime; after 25,000–14,700 years ago magma supply increased and became more irregular. Otherwise, the magma supply rate at Ubinas amounts to about 0.18–0.13 cubic kilometres per millennium (0.043–0.031 mi^{3}/ka), with an average rate of 0.15 cubic kilometres per millennium (0.036 mi^{3}/ka).

== Eruptive history ==
Ubinas started to develop in the middle and late Pleistocene epoch. The oldest pre-Ubinas volcanics crop out north and south of the volcano and include the volcanoes Parhuane Grande and Parhuane Chico directly to the north. Volcanic activity started after a change in regional tectonics, which may have triggered the formation of magma chambers. The volcano developed in two phases, Ubinas I and Ubinas II: Ubinas I is represented by lava flows at the foot of the volcano and debris and ignimbrite deposits in the south and southeast of Ubinas, and it forms a 600-metre-high (2,000 ft) shield. It was later cut on its southern side by a debris avalanche that probably occurred over 376,000 years ago. The last activity of Ubinas I generated more than four units of pyroclastic flows, with a total volume of about 1.8 cubic kilometres (0.43 cu mi), and possibly an old caldera 269,000 ± 16,000 years ago.

Ubinas II is steeper and rises 900 metres (3,000 ft) above the Ubinas I shield. It consists mainly of 20–40-metre-thick (66–131 ft) lava flows but also several lava domes with accompanying block-and-ash flows, all of which formed between 261,000 ± 10,000 and 142,000 ± 30,000 years ago. A lack of more recent volcanic outcrops suggests a period of dormancy lasting until 25,000–14,700 years ago during which glaciation took place on the volcano.

Reactivated volcanic activity started between 25,000 and 14,700 years ago and led to the emplacement of ash flows, pumice layers and tephra from phreatomagmatic and explosive eruptions, with deposits having thicknesses ranging from 2–4 metres (6 ft 7 in – 13 ft 1 in) in many places. The total volume of each eruption deposit ranges from 1–2 cubic kilometres (0.24–0.48 cu mi) and they crop out as far as 35 kilometres (22 mi) from Ubinas. It is likely that the summit caldera formed during this time period, before 9,700 years ago.

Over the last 7,500 years, volcanic activity has been characterized mainly by various kinds of explosive eruptions. These eruptions have expelled less than 0.1 cubic kilometres (0.024 cu mi) of material each time and left widespread deposits of ash, volcanic blocks and lapilli. A Plinian eruption occurred 980 ± 60 years BP and expelled 2.8 cubic kilometres (0.67 cu mi) of pumice and tephra, which has formed a deposit with five separate layers of pumice, ash and lapilli.

More eruptions identified by tephrochronology took place 1,890 ± 70, 7,480 ± 40, 11,280 ± 70, 11,480 ± 220 and 14,690 ± 200 years ago, yielding scoria and pyroclastic flows. The various explosive eruptions of Ubinas have deposited material as far as 15 kilometres (9.3 mi) away from the volcano. Landslides also took place in this time, including the 1 cubic kilometre (0.24 cu mi) collapse more than 3,670 ± 60 years ago.

=== Historical ===
Ubinas is the most active volcano in Peru and one of the most active in the Central Volcanic Zone; as of 2023 at least 27 explosive eruptions have occurred since the 16th century at an average rate of one eruption every twenty to thirty-three years. Events are recorded from 1550, 1599, 1600, (Note: In addition, the site of the 1600 Huaynaputina eruption was at first thought to be at Ubinas before its actual vent was identified.) 1662, 1667, (Note: An eruption of Huaynaputina reported for that year may actually be an event at Ubinas) 1677, 1778, 1784, 1826, 1830, 1862, 1865, 1867, 1869, 1906, 1907, 1912, 1923, 1936, 1937, 1951, 1956, 1969, 1996, 2006–2009, 2013–2016, 2016–2017 and 2019. Most of these eruptions consisted of emissions of ash and gas, sometimes accompanied by explosions, while more intense events such as in 1667 also produced scoria falls and pyroclastic flows. The 1667 eruption was the largest in historical time, producing about 0.1 cubic kilometres (0.024 cu mi) of scoria and reaching a volcanic explosivity index of 3. These eruptions have damaged communities around the volcano, and occasionally caused epidemics and human and cattle fatalities resulting from the ingestion of ash.

Aside from regular eruptions, there are fumarolic-seismic events such as in 1995–1996 when sulfur dioxide and water vapour, emitted at temperatures of up to 440 °C (824 °F), formed clouds that rose over 1 kilometre (0.62 mi) above the crater. Ubinas persistently emanates smoke, and lahars which have damaged fields, irrigation canals and paths have been recorded, such as the 2016 lahars caused by early 2016 precipitation events which mobilized ash that had fallen over the previous years. These lahars destroyed local water supplies and left the Matalaque and Ubinas districts temporarily isolated.

==== 2006–2007 eruption ====
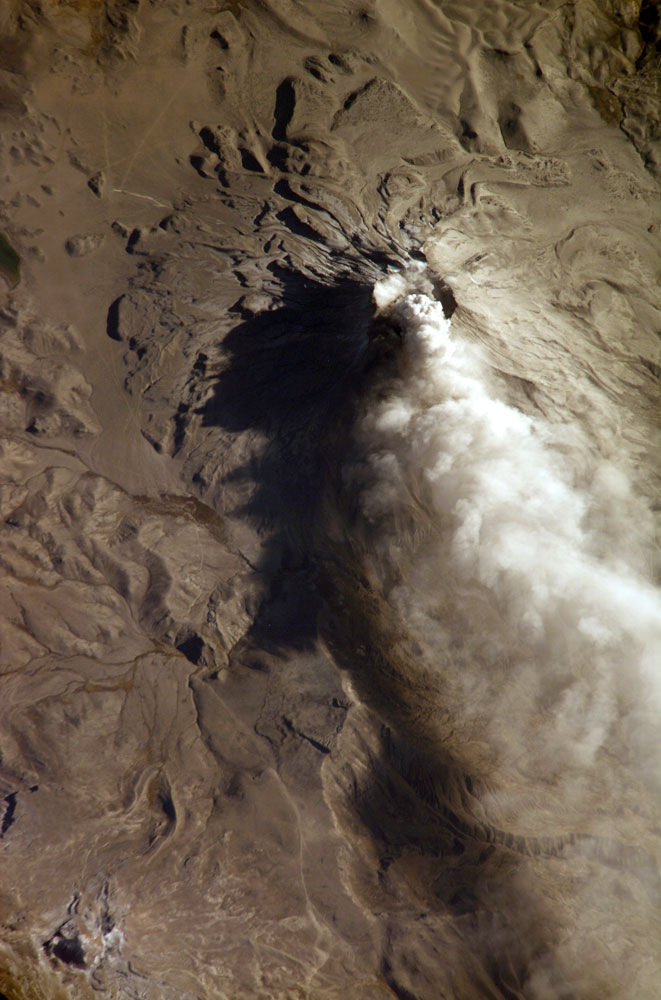
Ash clouds erupting from Ubinas in 2006

The first episode of the 2006–2007 eruption sequence involved the ejection of large volcanic bombs at high speed and the emission of small quantities of ash. Gas and ash columns were emitted between April and October 2006 and reached heights of about 3–4 kilometres (1.9–2.5 mi). Volcanically induced melting of snow that had fallen on the summit during the 2006–2007 summer induced a mudflow in January 2007 that descended into the Ubinas River valley. Volcanic activity—degassing and of Vulcanian eruptions—decreased until late 2009. This eruption was probably triggered by the entry of fresh magma in the magma plumbing system and the subsequent interaction of ascending magmas with the hydrothermal system of Ubinas. Beginning in July 2009, eruptive activity decreased considerably, being replaced with steady fumarolic emissions.

Despite its record of activity, Ubinas was essentially unmonitored before the 2006 event: the inhabitants of the area were largely unaware of volcanic hazards, and there were no emergency plans for future eruptions available. A "Scientific Committee" was formed on March 30, 2006 to remedy these issues. A region of about 100 square kilometres (39 sq mi) was hit by the effects of the eruption. The ash fall from the eruption caused health problems and disrupted pastures and agriculture in the region around the volcano, resulting in about US$1,000,000 of damage and the flight of local residents to Arequipa and Moquegua. The village of Querapi on the southern flank was temporarily evacuated to a location with shelters farther south, and two shelters were designated in low-risk areas around the volcano, one at Anascapa and the other at Chacchagen, 1.5 kilometres (0.93 mi) away from Matalaque. Furthermore, Lake Salinas, an important source of water in the region, was threatened by the eruption.

==== 2013–2014 eruption and later episodes ====
A new eruption period started on 2 September 2013 with a phreatic explosion, which was followed by more events in the next few days. Strong but variable seismic activity, the observation of thermal anomalies in satellite images and the exhalation of gases characterized this eruption period. Lava effusion began in the summit crater in 2014 and increased after the 2014 Iquique earthquake, culminating in an explosive eruption on April 19, 2014. Volcanic activity decreased afterwards until September 2014. The eruptions were accompanied by earthquakes, rumbling noises from the volcano, ash fall and the forceful ejection of large blocks. In light of the volcanic activity, Peru declared a state of emergency in August 2013 and evacuated the village of Querapi at Ubinas, whose population returned in 2016; The evacuation of the town of Ubinas was also considered. The 2006 and 2013–2017 activity induced the Peruvian government to invest additional resources in volcano monitoring.

After these events, in 2015–2017 the volcano often persistently released ash and gas, accompanied by earthquakes as well as occasional explosions and eruption columns. In April 2015, for example, activity at Ubinas led to a declaration of emergency for the districts surrounding the volcano, then in September of the same year an eruption generated a 4-kilometre-high (2.5 mi) eruption column that produced ash fall in the region, leading to evacuations.

On 18 June 2019, earthquake activity increased and a new eruption commenced on 24 June, with eruption columns rising 5 kilometres (3.1 mi) above the summit crater. The most energetic eruption episode took place on 19 July 2019 with three major explosions. The explosions and ash emissions triggered evacuations and impacted 29,703 people in various districts of the Puno and Tacna Regions, as well as Bolivia and Argentina. Since then the volcano has been active with ash and steam emissions, earthquakes and lahars. In May 2023, an increase of seismic activity preceded a new eruption that commenced on 22 June 2023. This eruption petered out at the end of the year, while lahars descended its slopes.

== Hazards and management ==
Hazards stemming from volcanic activity at Ubinas are mainly the fallout from explosive eruptions, lahars of different origins, large landslides that can generate debris flows and pyroclastic flows. Small explosive eruptions are the most likely occurrences at Ubinas, while large Plinian eruptions are considerably less likely. The area of the cone itself is the area most likely to be affected by volcanic phenomena, while pyroclastic flows and lahars are a danger for the valleys that drain Ubinas in southeastern direction and landslides are hazardous for an area of the southern flank. The town closest to the volcano is only 4 kilometres (2.5 mi) away from Ubinas. Large Plinian eruptions could have effects on the city of Arequipa.

The Volcano Observatory of INGEMMET monitors the seismic activity, any deformation and emissions of the mountain, and hot spring and gas composition at Ubinas. It regularly publishes a report on the activity of Ubinas. When there are indications of increased volcanic activity, it can recommend that the local government raise the volcano hazard level. Hazard maps were created during the 2006 eruptive event to show the relative risk in various locations around the volcano, which is graded in a three-zone scheme with one high-risk, one intermediate-risk and one low-risk zone. A contingency map was created to show and explain the procedures to follow in case of various eruption scenarios. Both maps were widely disseminated after publication to aid in the response to future eruptions.

== Fumarolic and geothermal system ==
Fumaroles are active at the bottom of the inner crater, with about five separate fumarole areas identified within the crater before the 2006 eruption. In 1997, a gas cloud from the fumaroles filled the entire caldera during the nights. Fumarolic activity and degassing is limited to the crater; there is no evidence of such gas exhalations elsewhere on the volcano. Ubinas is a major source of volcanic carbon dioxide and sulfur dioxide in the atmosphere of Earth, producing SO_{2} at a rate of about 11.4 ± 3.9 kilograms per second (1,510 ± 520 lb/min). The sulfur dioxide output changes with volcanic activity. Reportedly, the sound of the fumaroles can be heard from the village of Ubinas.

The fumaroles along with the spontaneous potential of Ubinas indicate that the volcano hosts an active hydrothermal system 1–3 kilometres (0.62–1.86 mi) below the caldera. About 41 springs occur in the area; of these two are hot springs, are found on the southeastern slopes of Ubinas and are known as Ubinas Termal and Ubinas Fria. Both lie at 3,267 metres (10,719 ft) elevation, the waters flowing out of the springs have temperatures of 29.1 °C (84.4 °F) and 13.6 °C (56.5 °F), respectively. The composition of the waters in these springs indicate that they originate from the mixing of deep saline water, fresh water and volcanic fluids. Additional springs associated with the volcano are Baños de Cura, Exchaje, Huarina and Lucca; these hot springs and others in the region are considered to be part of a geothermal province known as "Ubinas" which also includes El Misti, and which deliver large amounts of dissolved minerals including arsenic to the local rivers.

== Climate and vegetation ==
The climate of the area changes with elevation. The summit of Ubinas has a cold climate with temperatures frequently falling below 0 °C (32 °F); at lower elevations temperatures can exceed 18 °C (64 °F) during daytime, but night frosts are still possible. The region is arid overall, but during the summer wet-season rainfall can cause landslides at lower elevation, and the upper parts of the volcano including the caldera can receive a snow cover. Weather data are available for the town of Ubinas at 3,200 metres (10,500 ft) elevation: the average temperature is 9–11 °C (48–52 °F) and the average annual precipitation is about 300–360 millimetres per year (12–14 in/year). The present-day snow line exceeds 5,400 metres (17,700 ft) elevation, but during the Pleistocene epoch it descended to about 4,900 metres (16,100 ft).

Vegetation at 3,400–4,200 metres (11,200–13,800 ft) elevation consists of grassland, bushes and low trees such as Buddleja coriacea, Escallonia myrtilloides, Polylepis besseri and Ribes brachybotrys forming a shrub vegetation in valleys. Farther up, between 4,200–4,700 metres (13,800–15,400 ft) lies a vegetation form called pajonal, which consists of creeping plants, grasses and shrubs made up of high Andean vegetation. Small lakes and areas of waterlogged soil form wetlands called bofedales, in which aquatic plants and rosette-forming plants grow; both bofedales and pajonal also feature cushion plants. The upper sector of Ubinas is vegetation-free. Animal species have been described mainly in the context of the National Reserve; they include various birds and camelids such as alpacas, guanacos, llamas and vicuñas.

== Human use ==
Sulfur deposits in the crater of Ubinas were considered among the most important sulfur deposits in Peru and were mined in the 19th century. Ubinas has been considered a potential place for geothermal energy production. Its eruptions between 2006–2017 have stimulated research on this volcano.

== See also ==
- Pirhuane
- Pucasaya
