= Achiri =

- Town
- Location within Bolivia
- Coordinates: 17°13′S 69°0′W
- Country: Bolivia
- Department: La Paz Department
- Province: Pacajes Province
- Municipality: Caquiaviri Municipality
- Elevation: 12,800 ft (3,900 m)

Population (2001)
  - Total: 646
- Time zone: UTC-4 (BOT)
- Postal code: 02-0302-0207-2001
- Climate: Cwb

Achiri is a location in the La Paz Department in Bolivia. In 2010 it had an estimated population of 817.

== Topography ==
Achiri is the central village of the Archiri Canton in the Caquiaviri Municipality in the Pacajes Province. It is located in the Bolivian Altiplano on a height of about 3,900 m at one of the affluxes to Río Desaguadero. Achiri lies halfway between Lake Titicaca to the north and Nevado Sajama to the south, the highest mountain of Bolivia with 5.542m.

== Climate ==
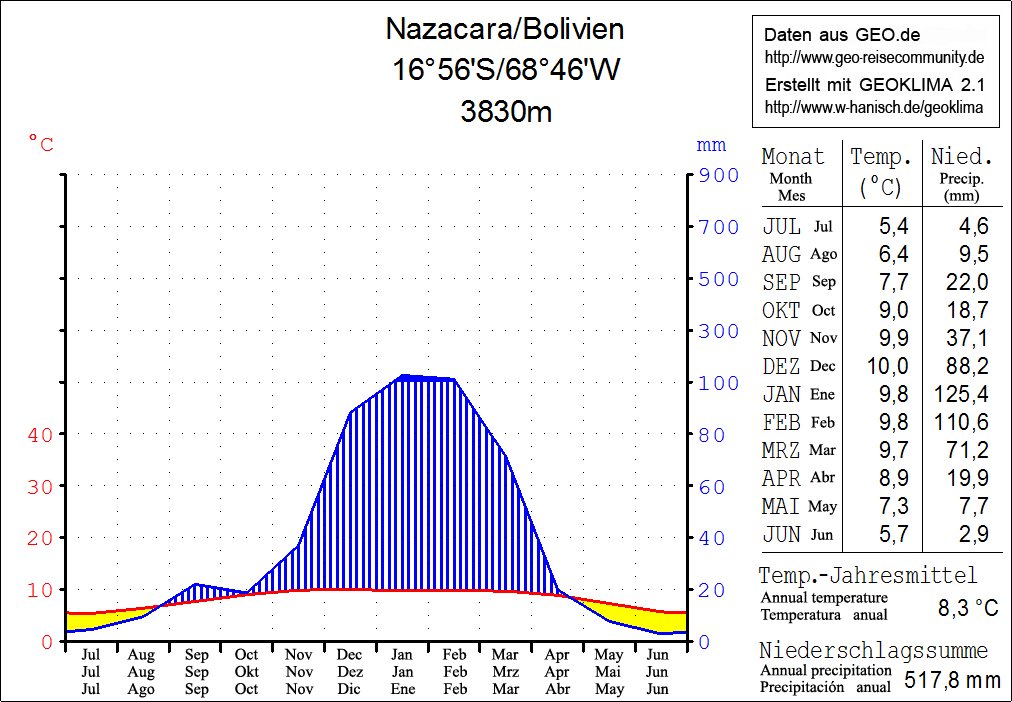
Climate

Achiri is situated between the Cordillera Oriental and the Cordillera Central in the Andean dry climate of the Altiplano, the average precipitation is about 500 mm. The day-night temperature difference is by far bigger than the difference between summer and winter.

The average temperature over the year is about 9 °C, the average temperatures of the months vary between 5 °C in July and 10 °C in December. The monthly precipitation is under 10 mm in the dry season from May until August and 100 to 125 mm from January to February.

Climate data for Achiri, elevation 3,880 m (12,730 ft), (1981–2010)
| Month | Jan | Feb | Mar | Apr | May | Jun | Jul | Aug | Sep | Oct | Nov | Dec | Year |
|---|---|---|---|---|---|---|---|---|---|---|---|---|---|
| Mean daily maximum °C (°F) | 17.3 (63.1) | 17.4 (63.3) | 17.5 (63.5) | 17.7 (63.9) | 16.6 (61.9) | 15.9 (60.6) | 15.5 (59.9) | 16.7 (62.1) | 17.7 (63.9) | 18.8 (65.8) | 19.8 (67.6) | 19.7 (67.5) | 17.6 (63.6) |
| Mean daily minimum °C (°F) | 3.1 (37.6) | 3.4 (38.1) | 2.5 (36.5) | −0.1 (31.8) | −5.8 (21.6) | −7.9 (17.8) | −8.3 (17.1) | −6.4 (20.5) | −4.7 (23.5) | −1.9 (28.6) | −0.4 (31.3) | 1.6 (34.9) | −2.1 (28.3) |
| Average precipitation mm (inches) | 140 (5.5) | 87 (3.4) | 71 (2.8) | 26 (1.0) | 3 (0.1) | 7 (0.3) | 3 (0.1) | 8 (0.3) | 9 (0.4) | 19 (0.7) | 36 (1.4) | 71 (2.8) | 480 (18.8) |
Source: National Meteorology and Hydrology Service of Peru

== Infrastructure ==
Achiri is located 148 route kilometers to the south west of La Paz, the capital of the Departamento with the same name.

From La Paz a bituminized route Fernstraße Ruta 2 leads to El Alto, from where the also bituminized Ruta 19 to the south west connects with Viacha. From that point on there is an earth road via Caquiaviri which gives access to Achiri and then goes to Charaña, close to the Chilean border.

== Population ==
The number of residents grew with the factor five in the last 20 years:

| Year | Inhabitants | Source |
|---|---|---|
| 1992 | 119 | Census |
| 2001 | 646 | Census |
| 2012 | 556 | Census |

In the Canton belonging to Achiri s inhabited by 2.776 people. The local population belongs to the indigenous ethnicity of the Aymara.
