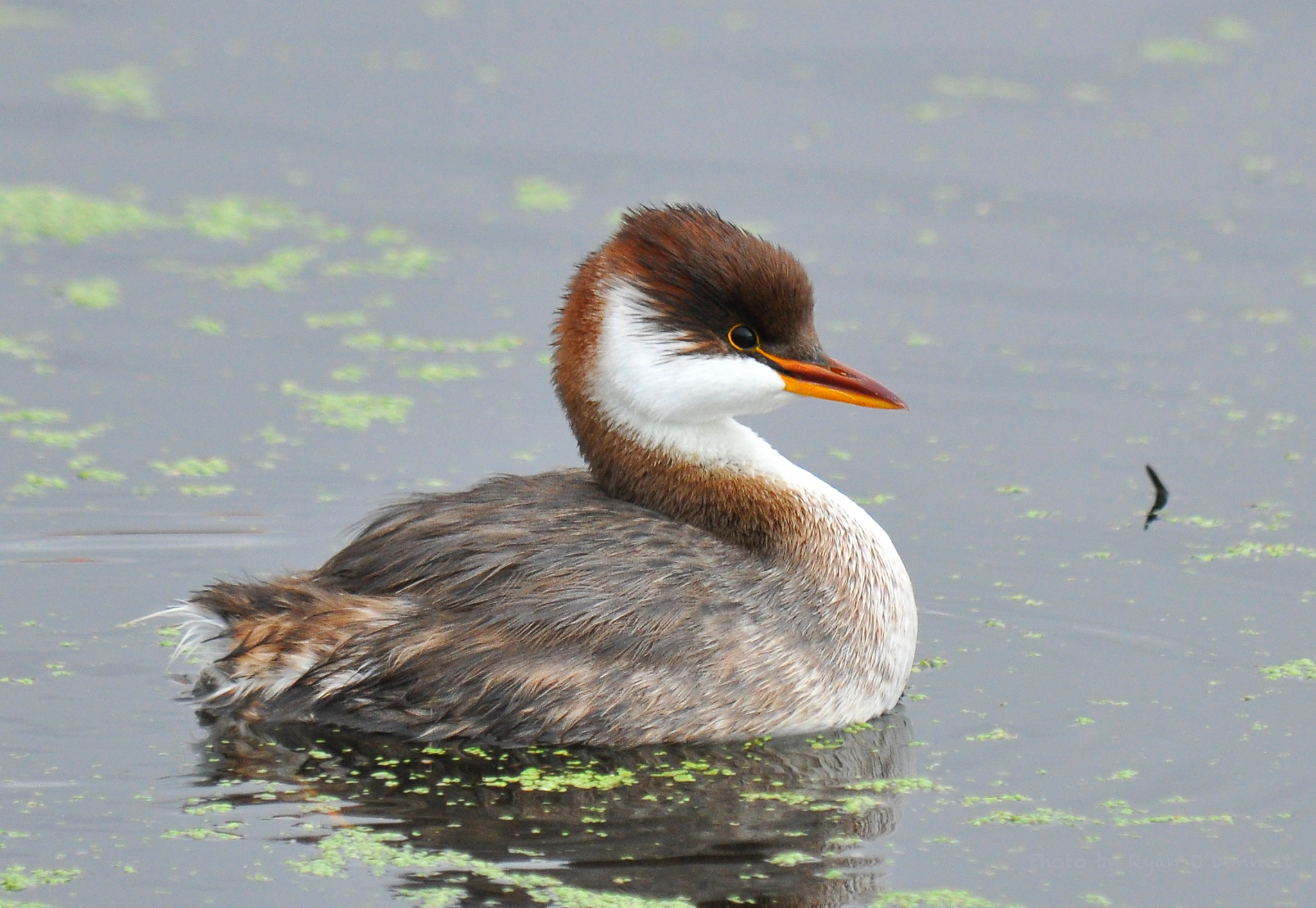

Conservation status
- Endangered (IUCN 3.1)

Scientific classification
- Kingdom: Animalia
- Phylum: Chordata
- Class: Aves
- Order: Podicipediformes
- Family: Podicipedidae
- Genus: Rollandia
- Species: R. microptera

Binomial name
- Rollandia microptera (Gould, 1868)

Synonyms
- Podiceps micropterus Gould, 1868; Centropelma microptera Sclater & Salvin 1869

= Titicaca grebe =

Species of bird

The Titicaca grebe (Rollandia microptera), also known as the Titicaca flightless grebe or short-winged grebe, is a flightless species of grebe found on the altiplano of Peru and Bolivia. As its name implies, its main population occurs on Lake Titicaca. Lake Uru Uru and Poopó, the Rio Desaguadero, and small lakes that connect to Lake Titicaca in wet years, serve as "spillovers" territory. In the past, the population was larger and several of these lakes – such as Lakes Umayo and Arapa – apparently had and may still have permanent large colonies (BirdLife International 2006). It is sometimes placed in Podiceps or a monotypic genus Centropelma. Its local name is zampullín del Titicaca.

== Description ==
This is a mid-sized grebe, varying from 28 to 45 cm in overall length. It weighs up to 600 g. Its coloration is unmistakable. The only grebe species it somewhat resembles is the red-necked grebe, which is not found in South America. The only congener, the white-tufted grebe, does not look very similar. The color pattern of the Titicaca grebe is altogether similar to that of the red-necked grebe, but it has a darker belly, and a white (not light grey) throat patch that runs down the neck nearly to the breast. Due to the short wings, the rufous flanks can usually be seen. The ornamental plumes on the head are a vestigial version of those of the white-tufted grebe, but dark. Iris and the lower bill are yellow. Juveniles and non-breeding adults are duller, lack the ornamental plumes, and in the case of the former have rufous stripes on the sides of the head and more white on the neck, so that the rufous breast does not show in swimming birds.

It is entirely flightless, but will use wing-assisted running over considerable distances. It is an excellent diver, reaching a burst speed of 3.5 km/h (2 knots).

== Distribution and habitat ==
The Titicaca flightless grebe occurs in a habitat mosaic in relatively shallow waters (up to about 10 m/35 ft deep). The reed belt is found in water of up to 4 m (13 ft) deep and constitutes the breeding habitat. It is made up mainly of Totora (Schoenoplectus californicus ssp. tatora). Other plants are the underwater Myriophyllum elatinoides and Hydrocharitaceae water weeds, and the floating duckweeds and Azolla. Potamogeton constitute the dominant underwater vegetation in the deeper parts, down to 14 m (some 45 ft).

In a study by O'Donnel and Fjeldsa they concluded that Grebes are strongly impacted and sensitive to environmental change.

== Diet ==
This species, like all grebes, feeds mainly on fish. Nearly 95% of prey mass is made up by the Orestias pupfish of the Titicaca drainage. The introduced silversides Odontesthes bonariensis (pejerrey) is not usually taken. As the grebe eats only prey smaller than some 15 cm (6 in), the adult pejerrey which are of commercial interest are not part of its diet as they are far too large. This species has also been known to attack the Titicaca lake frog, due to positive chemical chemistry in their papillae that reacts to the touch of the frog skin.

== Reproduction ==
It is likely that each pair which holds a territory attempts to breed once per year. The period in which the parents care for the young is probably rather prolonged, and there is possibly no fixed breeding season. Young birds become independent probably at somewhat less than 1 year of age, and there are usually 2 young per clutch, but there may be up to 4. Altogether, although more birds are found to incubate around December than at other times, about half the adult population seems to be breeding or caring for young at any time.

== Conservation status ==
It is classified by the IUCN as Endangered, with a population of less than 750 adults (BirdLife International 2006). Censuses in the latter part of the 20th century revealed that the population had declined from several thousand coincident with the introduction of monofilament line gill nets in the 1990s. It was confirmed (Martinez et al. 2006) that the mortality of grebes drowning in these nets is considerable, killing potentially thousands of individuals each year in 2003. Obviously, the 2001 survey which detected very low numbers was flawed for some reason and the species must be more common simply to sustain such losses. In 2003, the number of individuals was estimated to be over 2,500, with more than 750 mature birds, possibly as many as 1,500. This still is a marked decline from the pre-1990s figures.

The IUCN currently lists its threat status as EN A2cde+3cde; D. The "D" qualifier is not appropriate according to the latest results. Its addition was based on a pessimistic scenario based on 2001 field data (that the bird was near-extinct on Lake Titicaca, from which there was insufficient data then). Instead, the classification would be EN A3cde; C2a(i) or EN C1+2a(i), depending on how population numbers have developed since then. In any case, the 2003 survey indicated that subpopulations are fragmented, with probably no more than about 100 pairs occurring in any one area. It is not known how much the grebes move about until establishing breeding territories, but presumably, the species is fairly sedentary due to its flightlessness.

=== Threats ===
Apart from drowning in gill nets, other threats are probably only relevant in the short run, locally, or if several should manifest simultaneously. Eggs may be collected by locals on a small scale, and this is probably sustainable. Adult birds are not usually hunted as they taste of rancid fish like all grebes. Locally (e.g. around Puno), it may abandon habitat due to pollution and boat traffic; on the other hand, the delta of the Rio Coata at the northern end of Puno Bay seems prime habitat at least seasonally (Martinez et al. 2006). Overharvesting of reeds will also drive the birds from an area, but generally the threat of unsustainable use of totora is of less significance, at least in the short term. It is notable that the species evolved on the lake and has sustained several periods of rather pronounced climate change in addition to the normal ENSO. It apparently possesses a quite good capability to recover from population declines, which seems an adaptation to the fluctuating habitat availability even during periods of stable climate, as the lake routinely floods and recedes from considerable areas. Apparently, population numbers reached a low point in 1999 due to a severe drought following the "mega-ENSO" of 1997/1998, and have somewhat recovered since then.

Pejerrey fishery occurs mostly in waters too deep to be utilized by the grebes. While the coarser gill nets used for fishing pejerrey are technically more of a threat to the sizable grebes than the finer ones preferred for Orestias, the latter will still catch and drown especially young and inexperienced birds, and probably even attract these due to holding their favorite food. O. bonariensis is not only one of the two major hauls of the local fishing industries, but places a strain on the Orestias stocks. Insofar, a shift by the fishermen from Orestias to the silversides is likely to benefit them, the grebes, and the entire lake ecosystem.
