= Lake Ballivián =

Former lake in South America

Lake Ballivián is an ancient lake in the Altiplano of South America and is named after the Bolivian scholar Don Manuel Vicente Ballivian. It is part of a series of lakes which developed in the Titicaca basin along with Lake Mataro and Lake Cabana, reaching an altitude of 3,860 metres (12,660 ft). Lake Ballivián itself is of late Quaternary age and may have influenced the spread and development of animals in the Altiplano. In the southern Altiplano, Lake Escara may be coeval with Lake Ballivián.

== Context ==
The Altiplano in South America is a high plateau between the Eastern Cordillera and the Western Cordillera with an average altitude of 3,800 metres (12,500 ft) and a surface area of 200,000 square kilometres (77,000 sq mi). A number of evaporation landforms can be found in the Altiplano, including Salar de Uyuni and Salar de Coipasa. In the northern Altiplano lies Lake Titicaca.

While the present-day Altiplano has an arid-semiarid climate, it was formerly occupied by large lakes that grew and dried out in many phases. Of these lakes, Lake Ballivián and Lake Minchin were among the first to be described. Lake Mataro and Lake Cabana were later described in 1984 as previous ancient lakes in the Titicaca basin prior to Lake Ballivián. The name Ballivián was coined in 1909, it refers to the Bolivian scholar Don Manuel Vicente Ballivian. Sometimes that name is used to simply refer to precursor lakes of Titicaca.

== Lake ==
Lake Ballivián reached an altitude of 3,860 metres (12,660 ft). Another terrace at a height of 3,840 metres (12,600 ft) may correspond to a lake level drop of Ballivián or to a prolonged standstill. An erosion surface at 3,900 metres (12,800 ft) elevation and associated clays were formerly attributed to Lake Ballivián but today shorelines at that elevation are associated with Lake Cabana which predates glaciation.

The water surface would have covered 13,000–14,000 square kilometres (5,000–5,400 sq mi), about one and a half as large as present day Lake Titicaca, and extended farther south than the present-day Lake Titicaca while its eastern and western margins largely coincided with the present-day margins of Lake Titicaca. In some places, archipelagoes, gulfs and islands such as the present-day Copacabana Peninsula formed. It is documented from the Lake Titicaca basin, where it forms lacustrine abrasion surfaces and deposits of clay and sand at a height of 70 metres (230 ft) above the lake level. The Azangaro Formation in Peru and Ulloma Formation in Bolivia are deposits of Lake Ballivián, as are clays around Lake Titicaca. Remains of the lake are found on the western and southern sides of the lake basin. An old theory envisaged that Lake Ballivián or some other precursor of Lake Titicaca originally was a northwestern prolongation of the Rio La Paz valley before gravelly deposits dammed it, or of a Pacific-draining valley which was blocked by volcanic activity.

Lake Ballivián is of late Quaternary age, it may have formed between 600,000 - 500,000 years ago. Such a dating is supported by fossils found in sediments left by the lake. The existence of Lake Ballivián in the Titicaca basin may coincide with the existence of Lake Escara, and preceded the existence of Lake Minchin. The water levels of Escara were much lower than these of Ballivián, indicating that the Ulloma-Capalla sill did exist at that time. It is possible that waters from Lake Ballivián broke through at Calacoto into the Rio Mauri valley, rapidly cutting down a new valley and draining the lake. The formation of the Rio Desaguadero outlet may have stabilized future lake levels.

A tectonic event shortly before the formation of the lake formed a trough which is now the location of Lake Titicaca. The interglacial Sorata-Choqueyapu I may be contemporaneous to Lake Ballivián, as would be the Saale glaciation in Europe and the Illinoian glaciation in North America.

During the Lake Ballivián episode, pupfish colonized the southern and central Altiplano. The diversification of Heleobia and Hyalella crustaceans, Orestias fish as well as the speciation of Biomphalaria snails may have also been influenced by the development of Lake Ballivián. The sponge Balliviaspongia is named after Lake Ballivián.
