= Rollandia =

Rollandia may refer to:

- Rollandia (bird), a genus of birds in the family Podicipedidae
- Rollandia, a former genus of plants now included in the genus Cyanea
- 1269 Rollandia, an asteroid
