= Qullpa Jawira (La Paz) =

- Etymology: Aymara

Location
- Country: Bolivia
- Region: La Paz Department

Physical characteristics
- Source: Andes
  - location: Pacajes Province, Caquiaviri Municipality
  - coordinates: 17°07′10″S 68°54′19″W
- Mouth: Desaguadero River
  - location: Ingavi Province, San Andrés de Machaca Municipality; Pacajes Province, Caquiaviri Municipality
  - coordinates: 17°03′00″S 68°51′00″W

The Qullpa Jawira (Aymara qullpa saltpeter, jawira river, "saltpeter river", also spelled Collpajahuira, Kollpa Jahuira) is a river in the La Paz Department in Bolivia. It is a right affluent of the Desaguadero River.

The river originates near 17°07′10″S 68°54′10″W from various streams at a mountain named Taruj Llani south of Utani Apu in the Pacajes Province, Caquiaviri Municipality. It flows in a north-eastern direction. The confluence with the Desaguadero River is south of the community of Janq'u Phuch'u on the border of the Ingavi Province, San Andrés de Machaca Municipality, at 17°03′00″S 68°51′00″W.
