= Corpa, La Paz =

Corpa
- Village
- Location within Bolivia
- Coordinates: 16°41′S 68°52′W
- Country: Bolivia
- Department: La Paz Department
- Province: Ingavi Province
- Municipality: San Andrés de Machaca Municipality

Population (2001)
  - Total: 418
- Time zone: UTC-4 (BOT)

Corpa is a location in Bolivia. In 2001 it had a population of 418.
