= Cabana (ancient lake) =

Ancient lake in the Altiplano

Lake Cabana is an ancient lake in the Altiplano.

The lake reached a water level of 3,900 metres (12,800 ft) over the central and northern Altiplano, 90 metres (300 ft) above the current lake levels of Lake Titicaca. The Capalla-Ulloma sill, which separates the Altiplano into a northern and southern basin, did not exist at that time and it did not split up the Cabana lake body. It left deposits reaching thicknesses of 50 metres (160 ft) of thickness; they have been found on the western and eastern sides of the basin. Erosion platforms and terraces covered with gravels and other wave cut structures are remnants of Lake Cabana.

In 1984, this lake was named by a group of researchers around A. Lavenu. Other ancient lakes on the Altiplano are Lake Mataro, Lake Ballivian, Lake Minchin and Lake Tauca. An erosion surface at 3,900 metres (12,800 ft) elevation and associated clays were formerly attributed with Ballivián but today shorelines at that elevation are instead associated with Cabana.

The lake existed about 1 million years ago. It was preceded by Lake Mataro and succeeded by Lake Escara and Lake Ballivian, the latter in the north and the former in the south. The Kaluyo glaciation preceded the formation of Lake Cabana, earlier it was believed that the 3,900 metres (12,800 ft) high formations predated any glaciation. A phase of tectonic extension in the Titicaca basin may have favoured the formation of this lake. The existence of this lake may have facilitated the diversification of Heleobia snails, but increased speciation only occurred during the subsequent Ballivian episode.
