= Thujsa Jawira (Pacajes) =

- Etymology: Aymara

Location
- Country: Bolivia
- Region: La Paz Department, Pacajes Province

Physical characteristics
- Source
  - location: Caquiaviri Municipality
- Mouth
  - location: Caquiaviri Municipality
  - coordinates: 16°56′45″S 68°46′15″W

Thujsa Jawira (Aymara thujsa smelling, jawira river, "smelling river", also spelled Tujsa Jahuira) is a river in the La Paz Department in Bolivia. It is a left tributary of the Desaguadero River. The confluence is in the Caquiaviri Municipality of the Pacajes Province south of the village of Nasa Q'ara (Nazacara).

== See also ==
- Jach'a Jawira
- Qala Jawira
