= Caquiaviri Municipality =

- Municipality
- Location of the Caquiaviri Municipality within Bolivia
- Coordinates: 17°00′0″S 68°45′0″W
- Country: Bolivia
- Department: La Paz Department
- Province: Pacajes Province
- Seat: Caquiaviri

Government
  - Mayor: Benjamin Ayala Cussi (2007)
  - President: Walter Francisco Tarqui (2007)

Area
  - Total: 600 sq mi (1,560 km^{2})
- Elevation: 13,000 ft (4,000 m)

Population (2001)
  - Total: 11,901
- Time zone: UTC-4 (BOT)

Caquiaviri Municipality is the second municipal section of the Pacajes Province in the La Paz Department, Bolivia. Its seat is Caquiaviri.

== See also ==
- Achiri
- Jach'a Jawira
- Thujsa Jawira
- Qala Jawira
- Qullpa Jawira
- Q'awiri Qullu
- Utani Apu
