= Lake Titicaca =

Large lake on the border of Peru and Bolivia

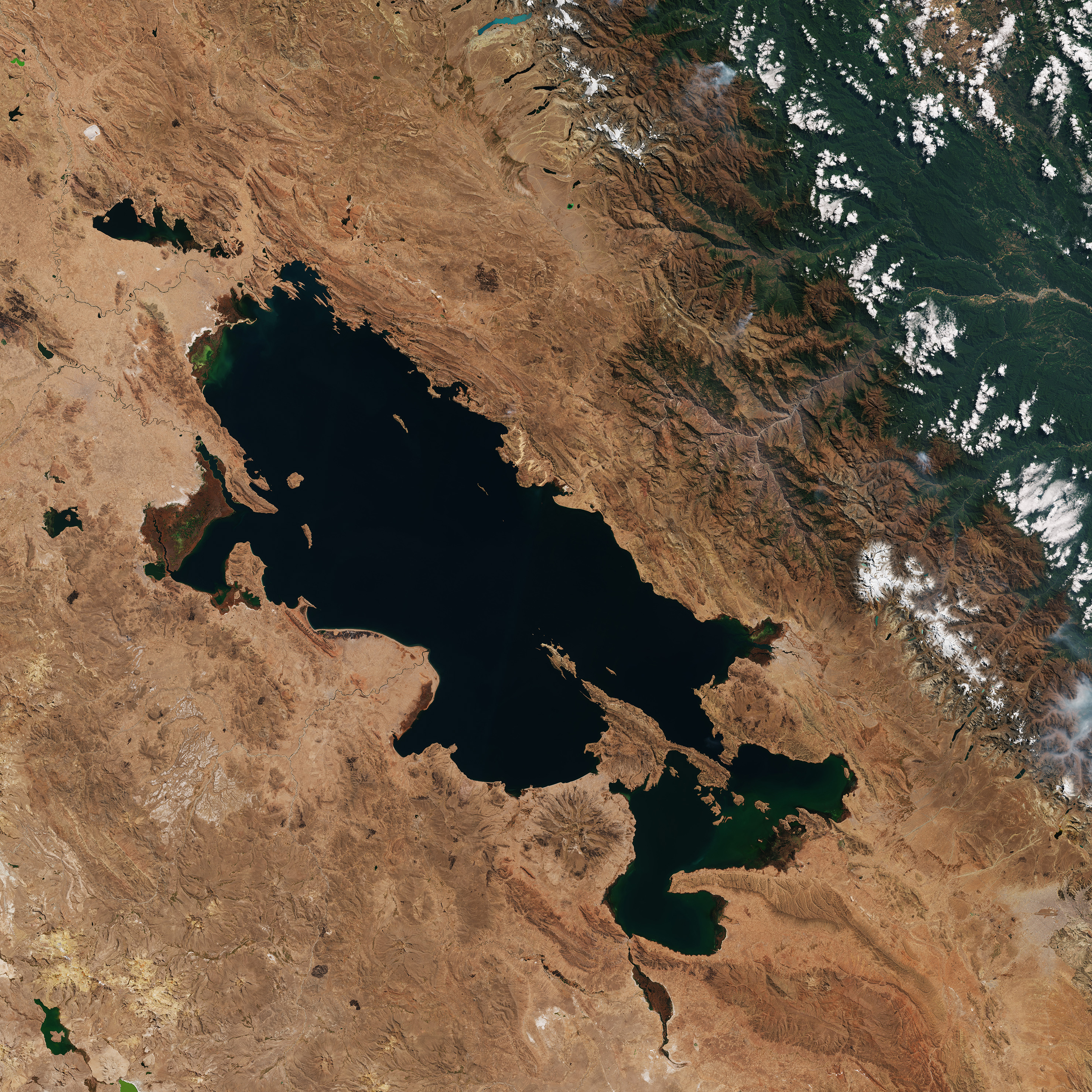
- Sentinel-2 satellite image of Lake Titicaca from 2021

- Location within Bolivia Location within Peru Location within South America
- Interactive map of Lake Titicaca
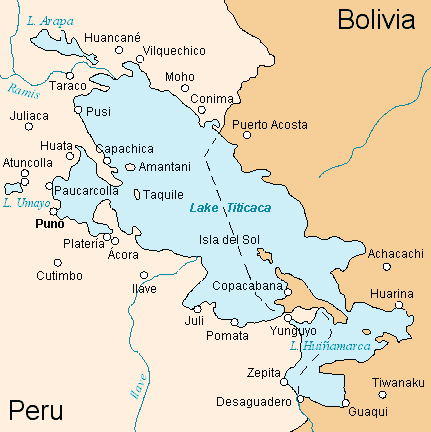
- Map of Lake Titicaca
- Coordinates: 15°49′30″S 69°19′30″W
- Type: Ancient lake
- Primary inflows: 27 rivers
- Primary outflows: Evaporation (primary), Desaguadero River
- Catchment area: 58,000 km^{2} (22,400 sq mi)
- Basin countries: Bolivia and Peru
- Max. length: 190 km (118 mi)
- Max. width: 80 km (50 mi)
- Surface area: 8,372 km^{2} (3,232 sq mi)
- Average depth: 107 m (351 ft)
- Max. depth: 281 m (922 ft)
- Water volume: 896 km^{3} (215 cu mi)
- Residence time: 1,343 years
- Shore length^{1}: 1,125 km (699 mi)
- Surface elevation: 3,812 m (12,507 ft)
- Frozen: never
- Islands: 42+ (see article)
- Sections/sub-basins: Wiñaymarka
- Settlements: Copacabana, Bolivia; Puno, Peru

Ramsar Wetland
- Official name: Lago Titicaca
- Designated: 20 January 1997
- Reference no.: 881

Ramsar Wetland
- Official name: Lago Titicaca
- Designated: 11 September 1998
- Reference no.: 959
- ^{1} Shore length is not a well-defined measure.

Lake Titicaca (/tɪtɪˈkɑːkə/; Spanish: Lago Titicaca [ˈlaɣo titiˈkaka]; Quechua: Titiqaqa and Aymara: Titiqaqa) is a large lake in the Andes mountains on the border of Bolivia and Peru. It is often called the highest navigable lake in the world. It is often listed as a freshwater lake, though its waters are slightly brackish. Titicaca is the largest lake in South America, both in terms of the volume of water and surface area. (Note: Lake Maracaibo has a larger surface area, but it is a tidal bay, not a lake.) It is the 18th largest lake in the world. It has a surface elevation of 3,812 m (12,507 ft).

== Overview ==
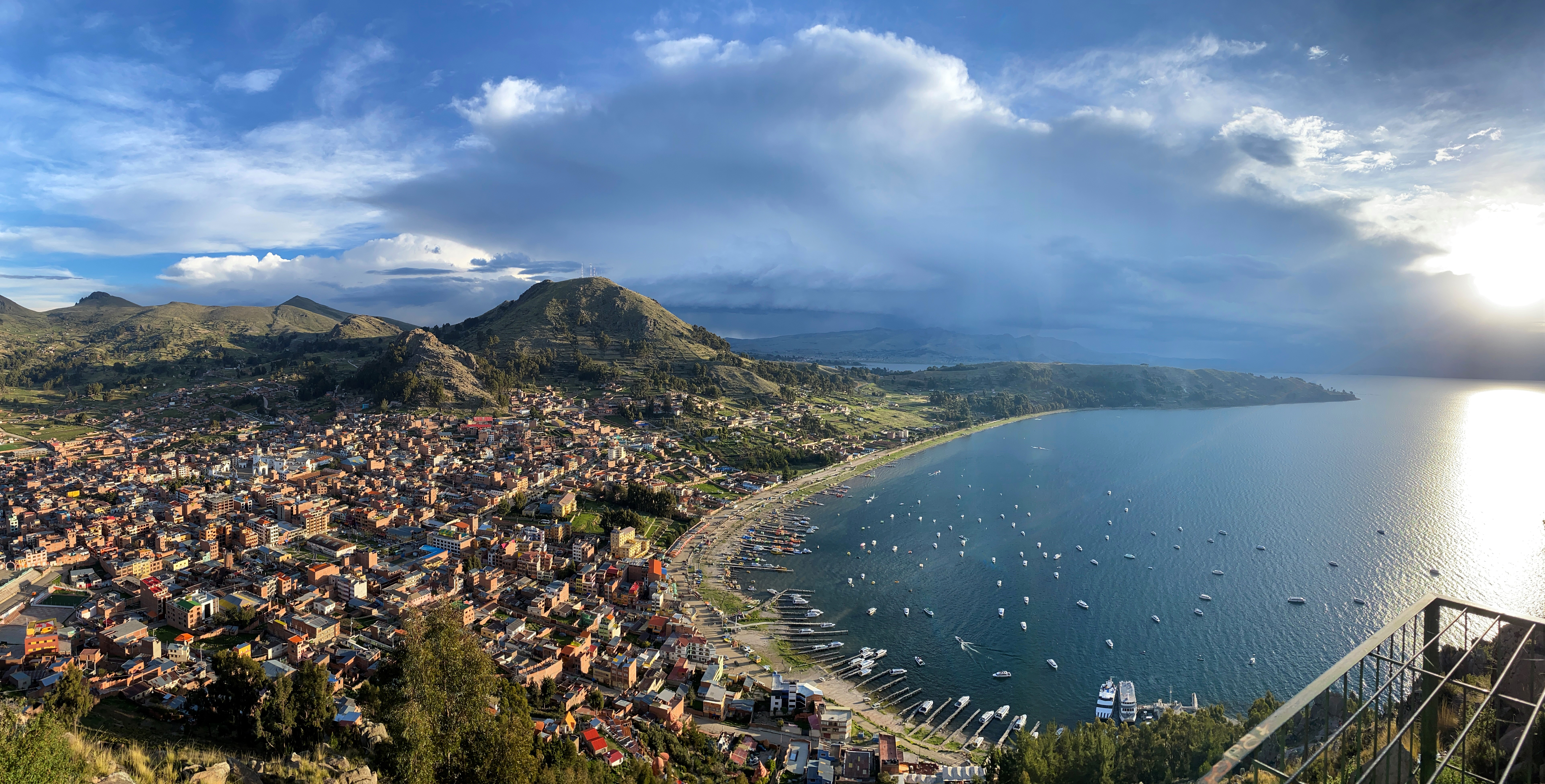
A view of Lake Titicaca taken from the town of Copacabana in Bolivia

The lake is located at the northern end of the endorheic Altiplano basin high in the Andes on the border of Peru and Bolivia. The western part of the lake lies within the Puno Region of Peru, and the eastern side is located in the Bolivian La Paz Department.

The lake consists of two nearly separate subbasins connected by the Strait of Tiquina, which is 800 m (2,620 ft) across at the narrowest point. The larger subbasin, Lago Grande (also called Lago Chucuito), has a mean depth of 135 m (443 ft) and a maximum depth of 284 m (932 ft). The smaller subbasin, Wiñaymarka (also called Lago Pequeño, "little lake"), has an average depth of 9 m (30 ft) and a maximum depth of 40 m (131 ft). The overall average depth of the lake is 107 m (351 ft).

Five major river systems feed into Lake Titicaca. In order of their relative flow volumes, these are Ramis, Coata, Ilave, Huancané, and Suchez. More than 20 other smaller streams empty into Titicaca. The lake has 41 islands, some of which are densely populated.

Having only a single season of free circulation, the lake is monomictic, and water passes through Lago Huiñaimarca and flows out the single outlet at the Río Desaguadero, which then flows south through Bolivia to Lake Poopó. This only accounts for about 10% of the lake's water balance. Evapotranspiration, caused by strong winds and intense sunlight at high altitude, balances the remaining 90% of the water loss. Its waters are slightly brackish, with UNESCO reporting its salinity as ranging from 5.2-5.5 parts per 1000. It is nearly a closed lake.

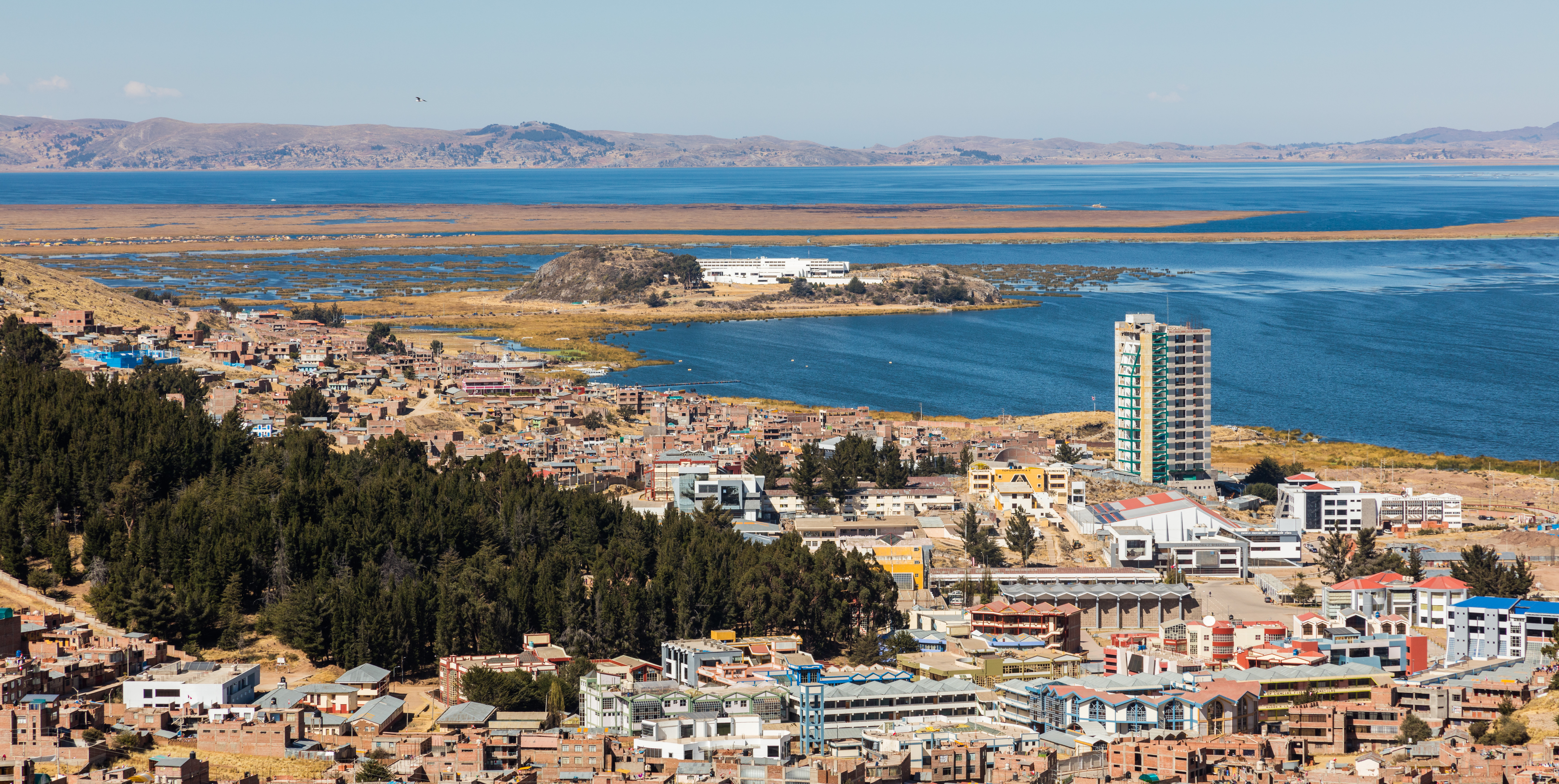
The city of Puno in Peru, the largest urban settlement on the lake

Since 2000, Lake Titicaca has experienced constantly receding water levels. Between April and November 2009 alone, the water level dropped by 81 cm (32 in), reaching the lowest level since 1949. This drop is caused by shortened rainy seasons and the melting of glaciers feeding the tributaries of the lake. Water pollution is also an increasing concern because cities in the Titicaca watershed grow, sometimes outpacing solid waste and sewage treatment infrastructure. According to the Global Nature Fund (GNF), Titicaca's biodiversity is threatened by water pollution and the introduction of new species by humans. A 2011 United Nations report found alarming concentrations of cadmium, arsenic, and lead in various parts of the lake. In 2012, the GNF nominated the lake "Threatened Lake of the Year".

== Name ==
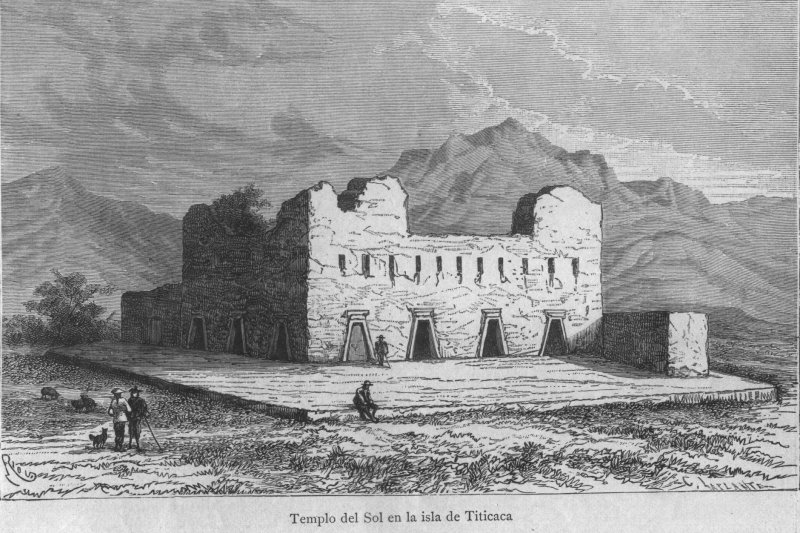
Drawing of Inca Templo del Sol (as seen in 1887) on the Isla del Sol, where the mummified body of Manco Cápac came to rest.

Given the various Indigenous groups that occupied the Lake Titicaca region, it likely lacked a single, commonly accepted name in prehistoric times and at the time the Spaniards arrived.

The terms titi and caca can be translated in several ways. In Aymara, titi can be translated as either puma, lead, or a heavy metal. The word caca (kaka) can be translated as white or grey hairs of the head and the term k’ak’a can be translated as either crack or fissure, or alternatively, comb of a bird. According to Weston La Barre, the Aymara considered in 1948 that the proper name of the lake is titiq’aq’a, which means gray, discolored, lead-colored puma. This phrase refers to the sacred carved rock found on the Isla del Sol. In addition to names including the term titi and/or caca, Lake Titicaca was also known as Chuquivitu in the 16th century. This name can be loosely translated as lance point. This name survives in modern usage in which the large lake is occasionally referred to as Lago Chucuito.

Stanish argues that the logical explanation for the origin of the name Titicaca is a corruption of the term thakhsi cala, which is the 15th- to the 16th-century name of the sacred rock on the Isla del Sol. Given the lack of a common name for Lake Titicaca in the 16th century, the Spaniards are thought to have used the name of the site of the most important indigenous shrine in the region, thakhsi cala on the Isla del Sol, as the name for the lake. In time and with usage, this name developed into Titicaca.

Locally, the lake goes by several names. The southeast quarter of the lake is separate from the main body (connected only by the Strait of Tiquina) and the Bolivians call it Lago Huiñaymarca (also Wiñay Marka, which in Aymara means the Eternal City) and the larger part Lago Chucuito. The large lake also is occasionally referred to as Lago Mayor, and the small lake as Lago Menor. In Peru, these smaller and larger parts are referred to as Lago Pequeño and Lago Grande, respectively.

== Highest lake ==
With a surface area of 8,372 km^{2} (3,232 sq mi) and an elevation of 3,812 m (12,507 ft), Lake Titicaca is often called the highest navigable lake in the world. That claim is generally considered to refer to commercial craft. Numerous smaller lakes around the world are at higher elevations, such as the 6,000 square metres (65,000 sq ft) crater lake of Ojos del Salado volcano in Chile, which at an elevation of 6,480–6,500 metres (21,260–21,330 ft) is the overall highest lake in the world, and the 280 km^{2} (110 sq mi) Lake Puma Yumco in Tibet, which at an elevation of 5,030 m (16,500 ft) is the highest large lake in the world. For many years, the largest vessel afloat on Lake Titicaca was the 2,200-ton (2,425 U.S. tons), 79 m (259 ft) SS Ollanta. Today, the largest vessel is most likely the similarly sized train barge/float Manco Capac, operated by PeruRail.

== Ecology ==
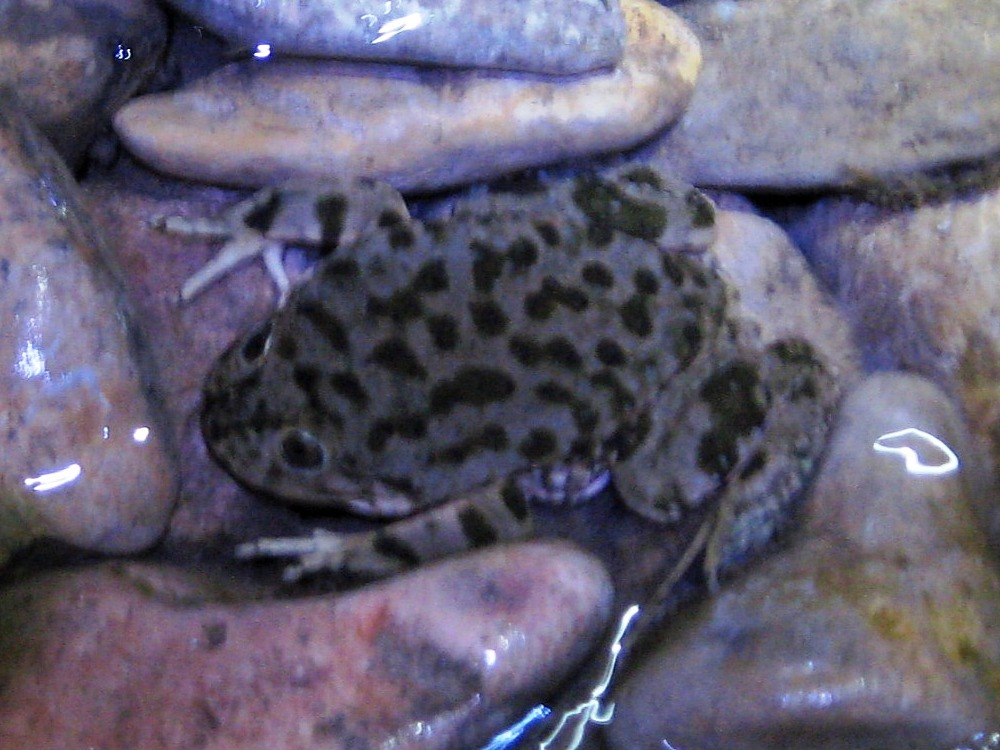
Two Telmatobius species occur in the lake, the smaller, more coastal marbled water frog (pictured, at Isla del Sol) and the larger, more deep-water Titicaca water frog.

Lake Titicaca is home to more than 530 aquatic species.

The lake holds large populations of water birds and was designated as a Ramsar Site on August 26, 1998. It has also been designated an Important Bird Area (IBA), in both Bolivia and Peru, by BirdLife International because it supports significant populations of many bird species. Several threatened species such as the huge Titicaca water frog and the flightless Titicaca grebe are largely or entirely restricted to the lake.

In addition to the threatened Titicaca grebe, some of the birds associated with water at Titicaca are the white-tufted grebe, Puna ibis, Chilean flamingo, Andean gull, Andean lapwing, white-backed stilt, greater yellowlegs, snowy egret, black-crowned night-heron, Andean coot, common gallinule, plumbeous rail, various ducks, wren-like rushbird, many-colored rush-tyrant, and yellow-winged blackbird.

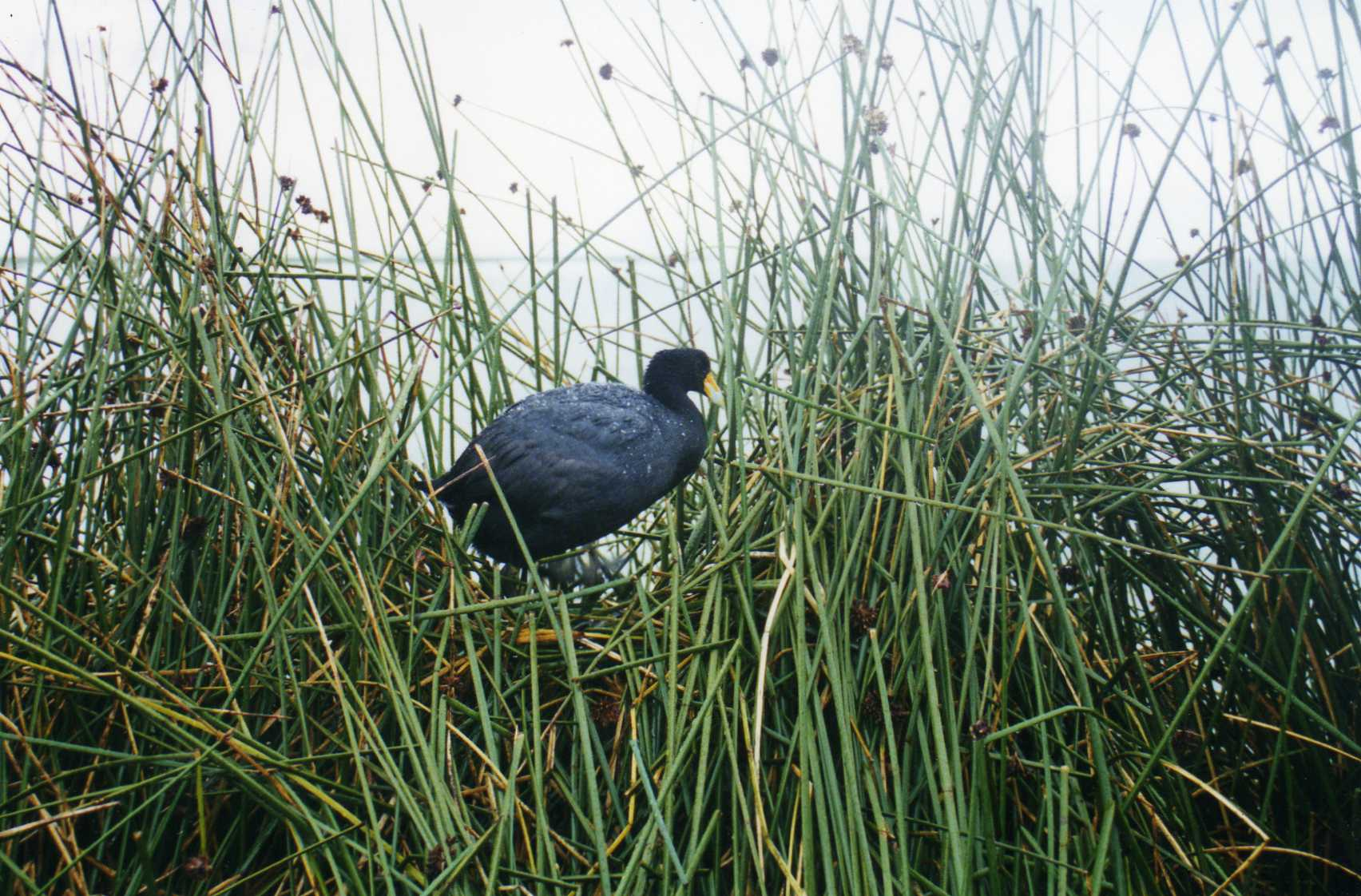
Andean coot among totora sedges

The Titicaca orestias has likely become extinct (last seen in 1938) due to competition and predation by the introduced rainbow trout and the silverside Odontesthes bonariensis. In addition to the Titicaca orestias, native fish species in the lake's basin are other species of Orestias, and the catfish Trichomycterus dispar, T. rivulatus, and Astroblepus stuebeli (the last species not in the lake itself, but in associated ecosystems). The many Orestias species in Lake Titicaca differ significantly in both habitat preference and feeding behavior. About 90% of the fish species in the basin are endemic, including 23 species of Orestias that only are found in the lake.

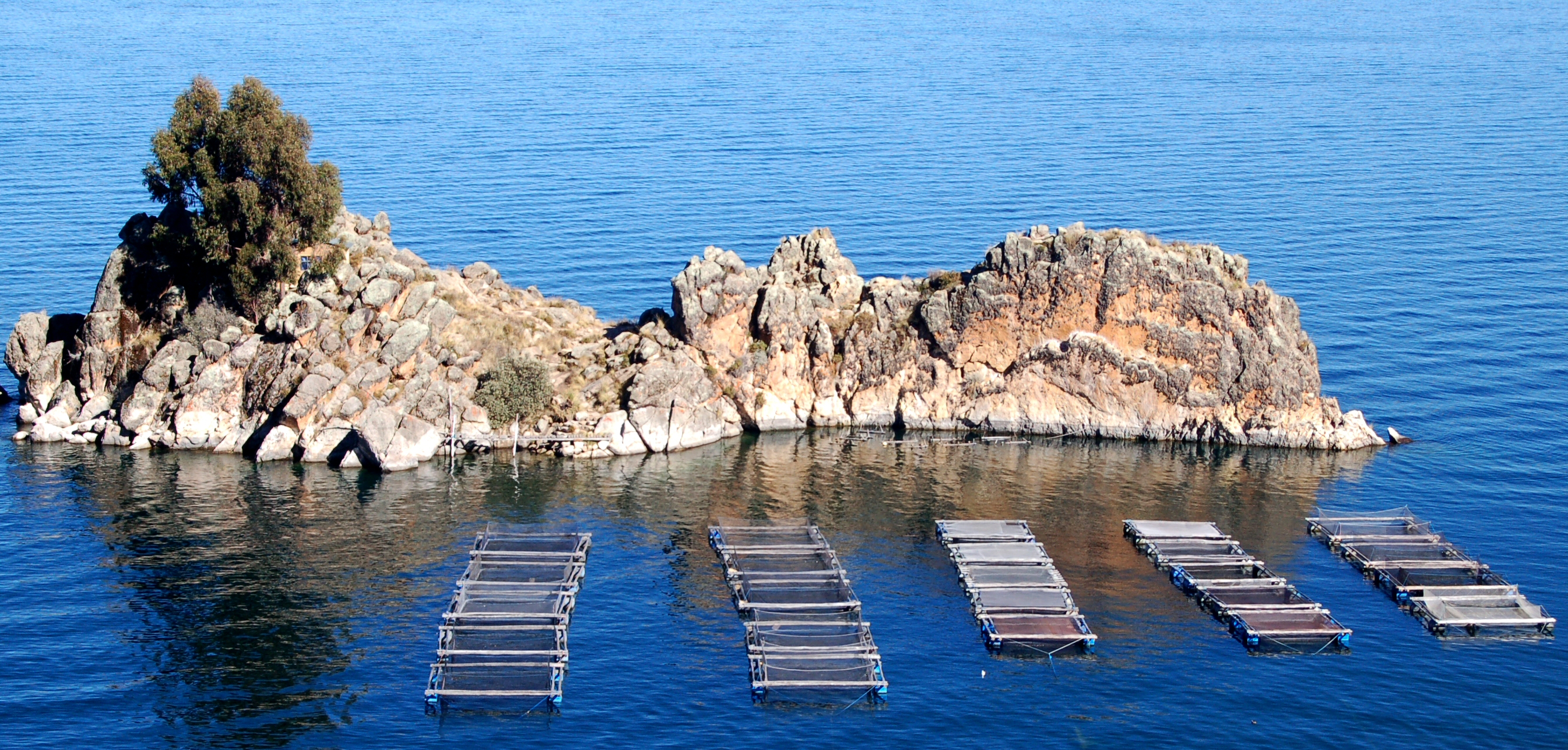
An artificial fish enclosure at a fish farming site near Copacabana, Bolivia

Titicaca is home to 24 described species of freshwater snails (15 endemics, including several tiny Heleobia spp.) and less than half a dozen bivalves (all in family Sphaeriidae), but in general these are very poorly known and their taxonomy is in need of a review. The lake also has an endemic species flock of amphipods consisting of 11 Hyalella (an additional Titicaca Hyalella species is nonendemic).

Reeds and other aquatic vegetation are widespread in Lake Titicaca. Totora sedges grow in water shallower than 3 m (10 ft), less frequently to 5.5 m (18 ft), but macrophytes, notably Chara and Potamogeton, occur down to 10 m (33 ft). In sheltered shallow waters, such as the harbour of Puno, Azolla, Elodea, Lemna and Myriophyllum are common.

== Geology ==
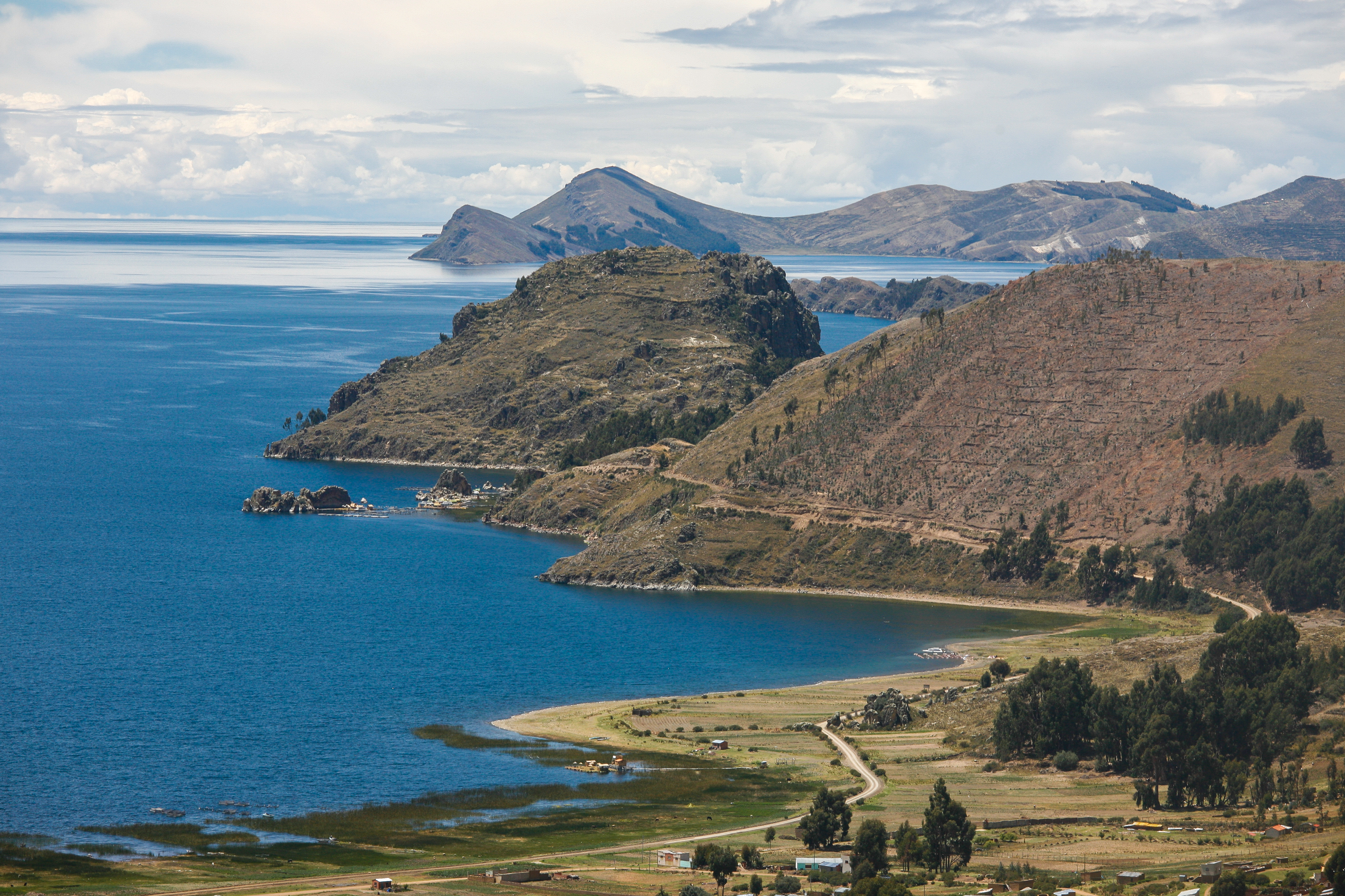
The intermontane basin surrounding Lake Titicaca

The Tinajani Basin, in which Lake Titicaca lies, is an intermontane basin. This basin is a pull-apart basin created by strike-slip movement along regional faults starting in the late Oligocene and ending in the late Miocene. The initial development of the Tinajani Basin is indicated by volcanic rocks, which accumulated between 27 and 20 million years ago within this basin. They lie upon an angular unconformity which cuts across pre-basin strata. Lacustrine sediments of the Lower Tinajani Formation, which are exposed within the Tinajani Basin, demonstrate the presence of a pre-Quaternary, ancestral Lake Titicaca within it between 18 and 14 million years ago (Mya). Little is known about the prehistory of Lake Titicaca between 14 Mya and 370,000 BP because the lake sediments dating to this period lie buried beneath the bottom of Lake Titicaca and have not yet been sampled by continuous coring.

The Lake Titicaca drilling project recovered a 136-m-long drill core of sediments from the bottom of Lake Titicaca at a depth of 235 m (771 ft) and at a location just east of Isla del Sol. This core contains a continuous record of lake sedimentation and paleoenvironmental conditions for Lake Titicaca back to about 370,000 BP. For this period of time, Lake Titicaca was typically fresher and had higher lake levels during periods of expanded regional glaciation that corresponded to global glacial periods. During periods of reduced regional glaciation that corresponded to global interglacial periods, Lake Titicaca had typically low lake levels.

Lacustrine sediments and associated terraces provide evidence for the past existence of five major prehistoric lakes that occupied the Tinajani Basin during the Pliocene and Pleistocene. Within the northern Altiplano (Tinajani Basin), these prehistoric lakes were Lake Mataro at an elevation of 3,950 m (12,960 ft), Lake Cabana at an elevation of 3,900 m (12,800 ft), Lake Ballivián at an elevation of 3,860 m (12,660 ft), Lake (North) Minchin at an elevation of 3,825 m (12,549 ft), and Lake (North) Tauca at an elevation 3,815 m (12,516 ft). The age of Lake Mataro is uncertain—it may date back to the Late Pliocene. Lake Cabana possibly dates to the Middle Pleistocene. Lake Ballivián existed between 120,000 and 98,000 BP. Two high lake stands, between 72,000 and 68,000 BP and 44,000–34,000 BP, have been discerned for Lake Minchin within the Altiplano. Another ancient lake in the area is Ouki. The high lake levels of Lake Tauca have been dated as having occurred between 18,100 and 14,100 BP.

== Underwater archaeology ==
Underwater excavations and surveys in and around Khoa reef, near the Island of Khoa, have recovered thousands of artifacts. These artifacts consist of ceramic feline incense burners, carved juvenile llamas, and well-crafted metal, shell, and stone ornaments. During the fifteenth and sixteenth centuries, Lake Titicaca was a mythical place and the location of a pilgrimage complex for the Incas. Part of this complex included Khoa reef as a location where offerings were dropped into the lake.

== Climate ==
Lake Titicaca has a cold subtropical highland climate. The average annual precipitation is 610 mm (24 in) mostly falling in summer thunderstorms. Winters are dry with very cold nights and mornings and warm afternoons.

The cold sources and winds over the lake give it an average surface temperature of 10 to 14 °C (50 to 57 °F). In the winter (June – September), mixing occurs with the deeper waters, which are always between 10 and 11 °C (50 and 52 °F). Below are the average temperatures of the town of Juliaca, in the northern part of the lake.

Climate data for Juliaca, Peru (1961–1990)
Month	Jan	Feb	Mar	Apr	May	Jun	Jul	Aug	Sep	Oct	Nov	Dec	Year
Mean daily maximum °C (°F)	16.7 (62.1)	16.7 (62.1)	16.5 (61.7)	16.8 (62.2)	16.6 (61.9)	16.0 (60.8)	16.0 (60.8)	17.0 (62.6)	17.6 (63.7)	18.6 (65.5)	18.8 (65.8)	17.7 (63.9)	17.1 (62.8)
Mean daily minimum °C (°F)	3.6 (38.5)	3.5 (38.3)	3.2 (37.8)	0.6 (33.1)	−3.8 (25.2)	−7.0 (19.4)	−7.5 (18.5)	−5.4 (22.3)	−1.4 (29.5)	0.3 (32.5)	1.5 (34.7)	3.0 (37.4)	−0.8 (30.6)
Average precipitation mm (inches)	133.3 (5.25)	108.7 (4.28)	98.5 (3.88)	43.3 (1.70)	9.9 (0.39)	3.1 (0.12)	2.4 (0.09)	5.8 (0.23)	22.1 (0.87)	41.1 (1.62)	55.3 (2.18)	85.9 (3.38)	609.4 (23.99)
Source: Hong Kong Observatory,

== Islands ==
=== Uros ===
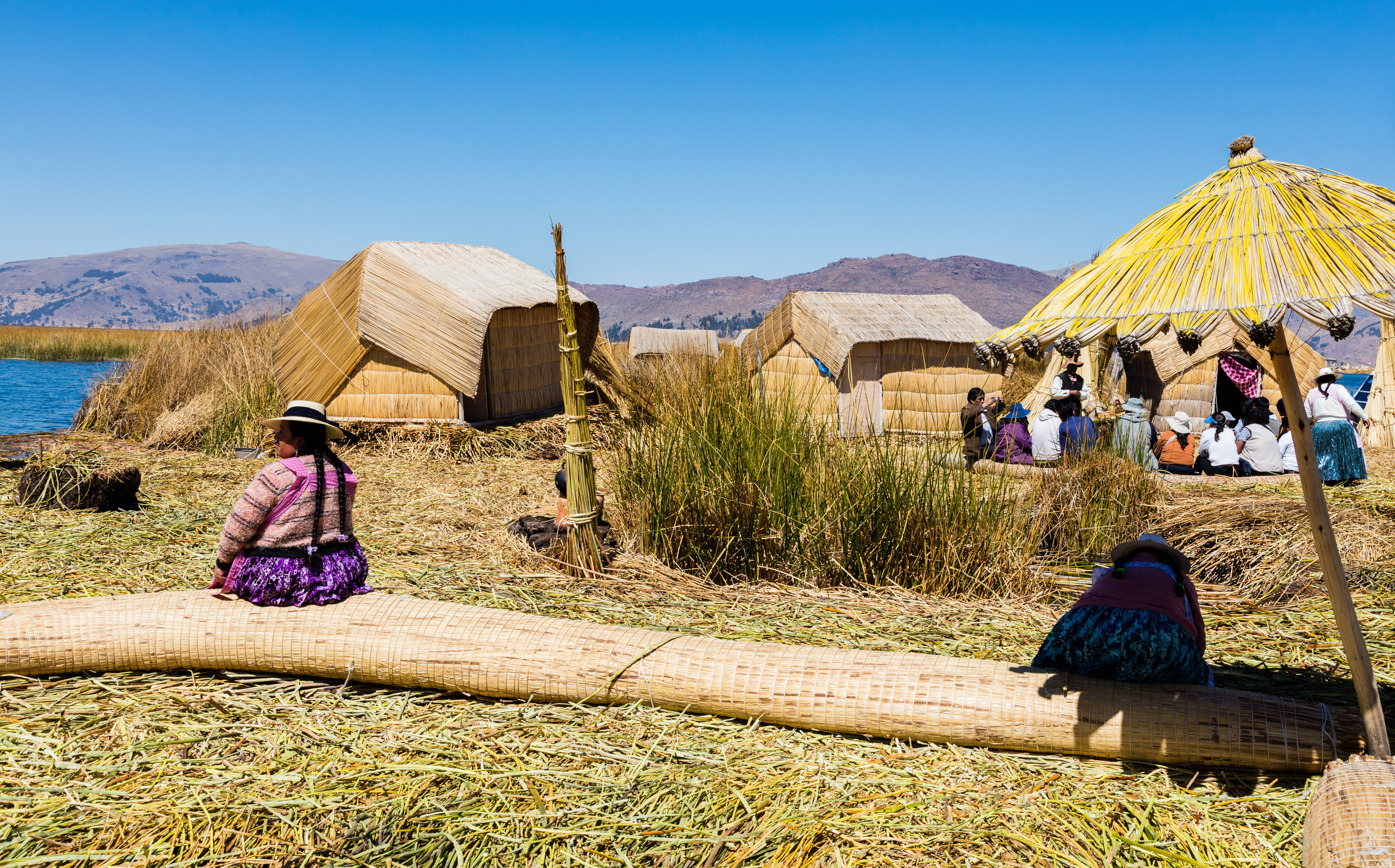
An Uros floating island in Peru

The "Floating Islands" are small, human-made islands constructed by the Uros (or Uru) people from layers of cut totora, a thick, buoyant sedge that grows abundantly in the shallows of Lake Titicaca. The Uros harvest the sedges that naturally grow on the lake's banks to make the islands by continuously adding sedges to the surface.

According to legend, the Uru people originated in the Amazon and migrated to the area of Lake Titicaca in the pre-Columbian era, where they were oppressed by the local population and were unable to secure land of their own. They built the sedge islands, which could be moved into deep water or to different parts of the lake, as necessary, for greater safety from their hostile neighbors on land.

Golden in color, many of the islands measure about 15 by 15 m (50 by 50 ft), and the largest are roughly half the size of a football field. Each island contains several thatched houses, typically belonging to members of a single extended family. Some of the islands have watchtowers and other buildings, also constructed of sedges.

Historically, most of the Uros islands were located near the middle of the lake, about 14 km (9 mi) from the shore; however, in 1986, after a major storm devastated the islands, many Uros rebuilt closer to shore. As of 2011, about 1,200 Uros lived on an archipelago of 60 artificial islands, clustering in the western corner of the lake near Puno, Titicaca's major Peruvian port town. The islands have become one of Peru's tourist attractions, allowing the Uros to supplement their hunting and fishing by conveying visitors to the islands by motorboat and selling handicrafts.

=== Isla del Sol ===
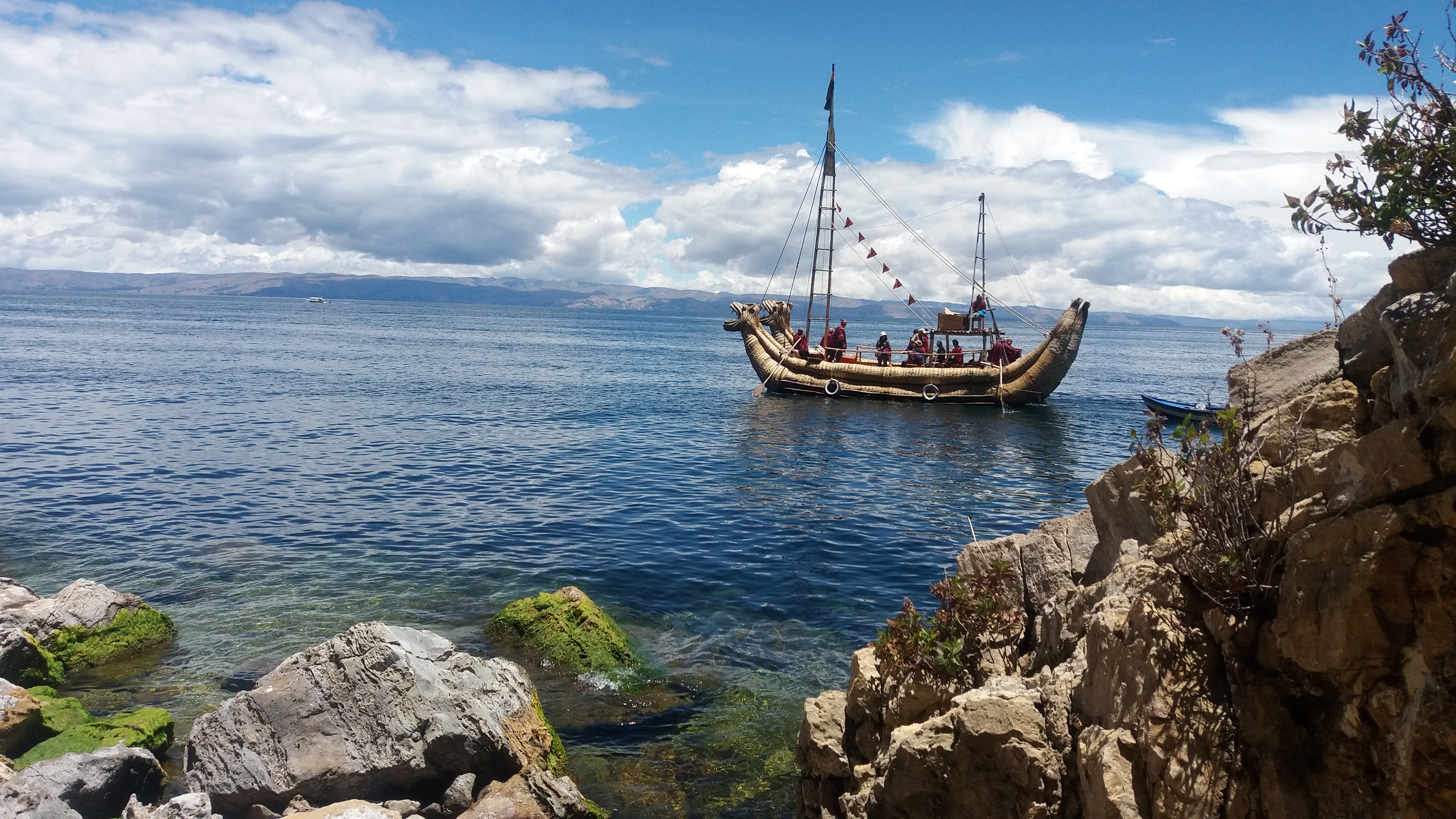
Isla del Sol in Bolivia, with a raft made from totora on Lake Titicaca

Situated on the Bolivian side of the lake with regular boat links to the town of Copacabana, Isla del Sol ("Island of the Sun") is one of the largest islands of the lake. Geographically, the terrain is harsh; it is a rocky, hilly island. No motor vehicles or paved roads are on the island. The main economic activity of the approximately 800 families on the island is farming, with fishing and tourism augmenting the subsistence economy.

Over 180 ruins remain on the island. Most of these date to the Inca period around the 15th century AD. Many hills on the island contain terraces, which adapt steep and rocky terrain to agriculture. Among the ruins on the island are the Sacred Rock, a labyrinth-like building called Chinkana, Kasa Pata, and Pilco Kaima. In the religion of the Incas, the sun god was believed to have been born here.

During 1987–92, Johan Reinhard directed underwater archaeological investigations off of the Island of the Sun, recovering Inca and Tiahuanaco offerings. These artifacts are currently on display in the site museum of the village of Challapampa.

=== Isla de la Luna ===
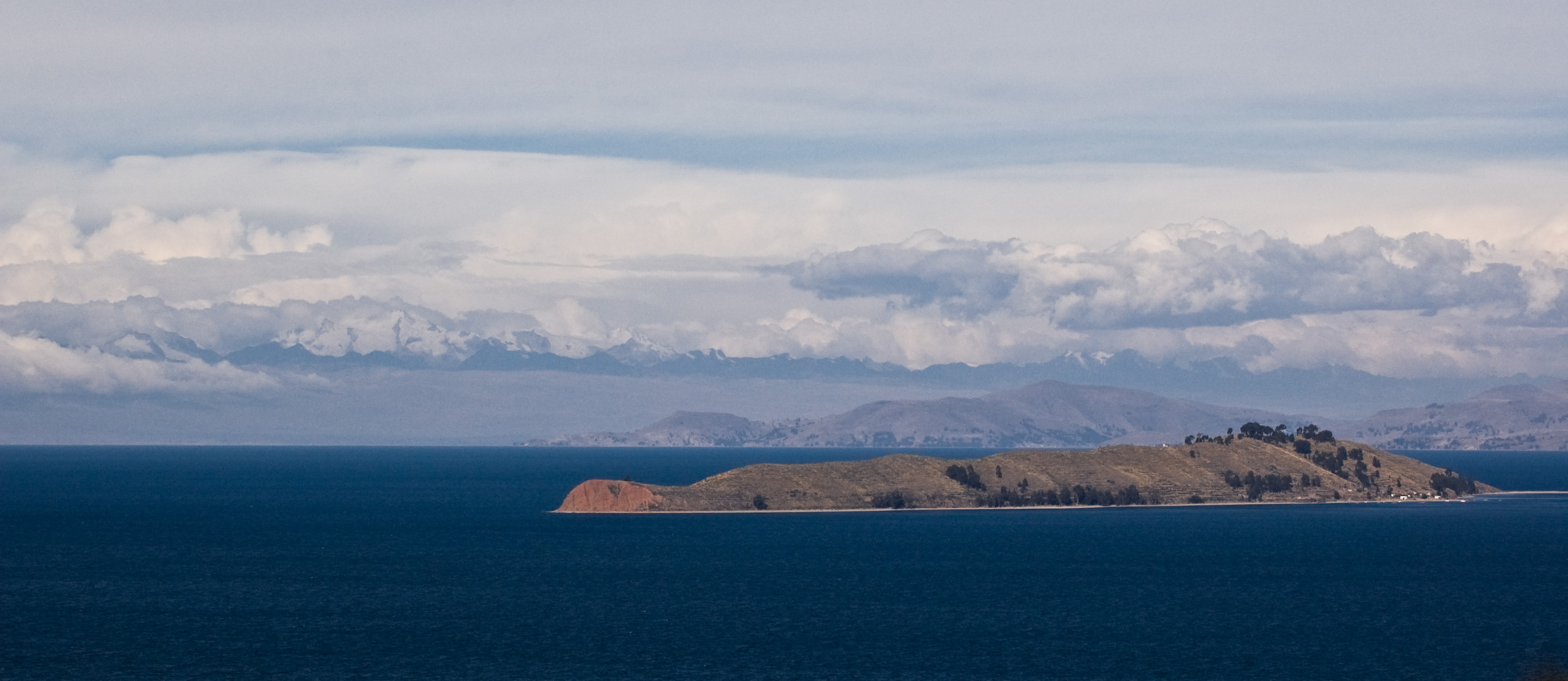
Isla de la Luna in Bolivia, with the Cordillera Real in the background

Isla de la Luna is situated east from the bigger Isla del Sol. Both islands belong to the La Paz Department of Bolivia. According to legends that refer to Inca mythology Isla de la Luna (Spanish for "island of the moon") is where Viracocha commanded the rising of the moon. Ruins of a supposed Inca nunnery (Mamakuna) occupy the eastern shore.

Archaeological excavations indicate that the Tiwanaku peoples (around 650–1000 AD) built a major temple on the Island of the Moon. Pottery vessels of local dignitaries dating from this period have been excavated on islands in Lake Titicaca. Two of them were found in the 19th century and are now in the British Museum in London. The structures seen on the island today were built by the Inca (circa 1450–1532) directly over the earlier Tiwanaku ones.

=== Amantani ===
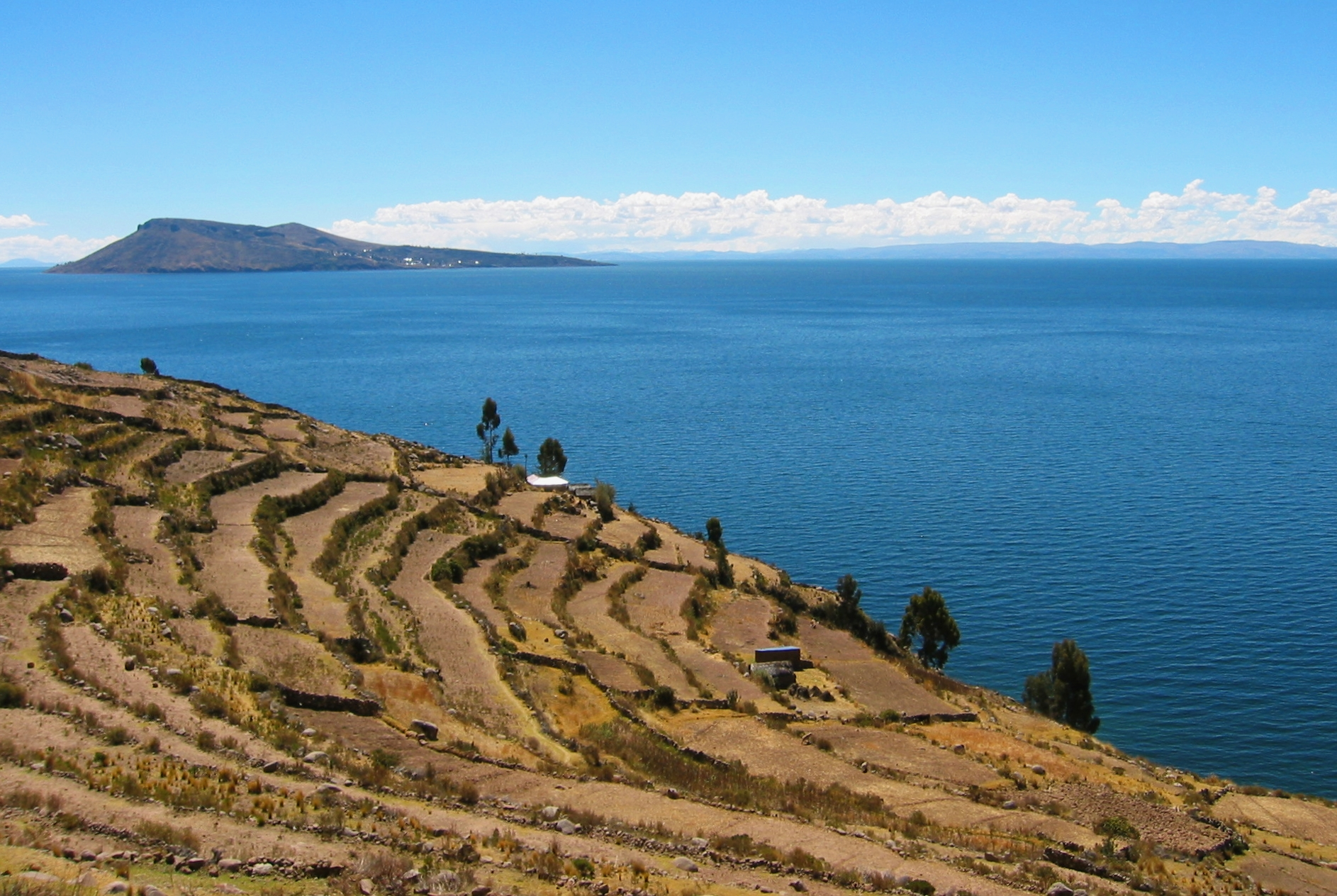
Amantani island (in the background left) in Peru

Amantani is another island on the Peruvian side of Lake Titicaca and is populated by Quechua speakers. About 4,000 people live in 10 communities on the roughly circular 15 km^{2} (6 sq mi) island. Two mountain peaks, called Pachatata (Father Earth) and Pachamama (Mother Earth) and ancient ruins are on the top of both peaks. The hillsides that rise up from the lake are terraced and planted with wheat, potatoes, and vegetables. Most of the small fields are worked by hand. Long stone fences divide the fields, and cattle and sheep graze on the hillsides.

No cars and no hotels are on the island. Since machines are not allowed on the island, all agriculture is done by hand. A few small stores sell basic goods, and a health clinic and six schools are found. Electricity was produced by a generator and provided limited power a few hours each day, but with the rising price of petroleum, they no longer use the generator. Most families use candles or flashlights powered by batteries or hand cranks. Small solar panels have recently been installed on some homes.

Some of the families on Amantani open their homes to tourists for overnight stays and provide cooked meals, arranged through tour guides. The families who do so are required to have a special room set aside for the tourists and must conform to a code specified by the tourist companies that help them. Guests typically take food staples (cooking oil, rice, etc., but no sugar products, as they have no dental facilities) as a gift, or school supplies for the children on the island. The islanders hold nightly traditional dance shows for the tourists, where they offer to dress them up in their traditional clothes and allow them to participate.

=== Taquile ===
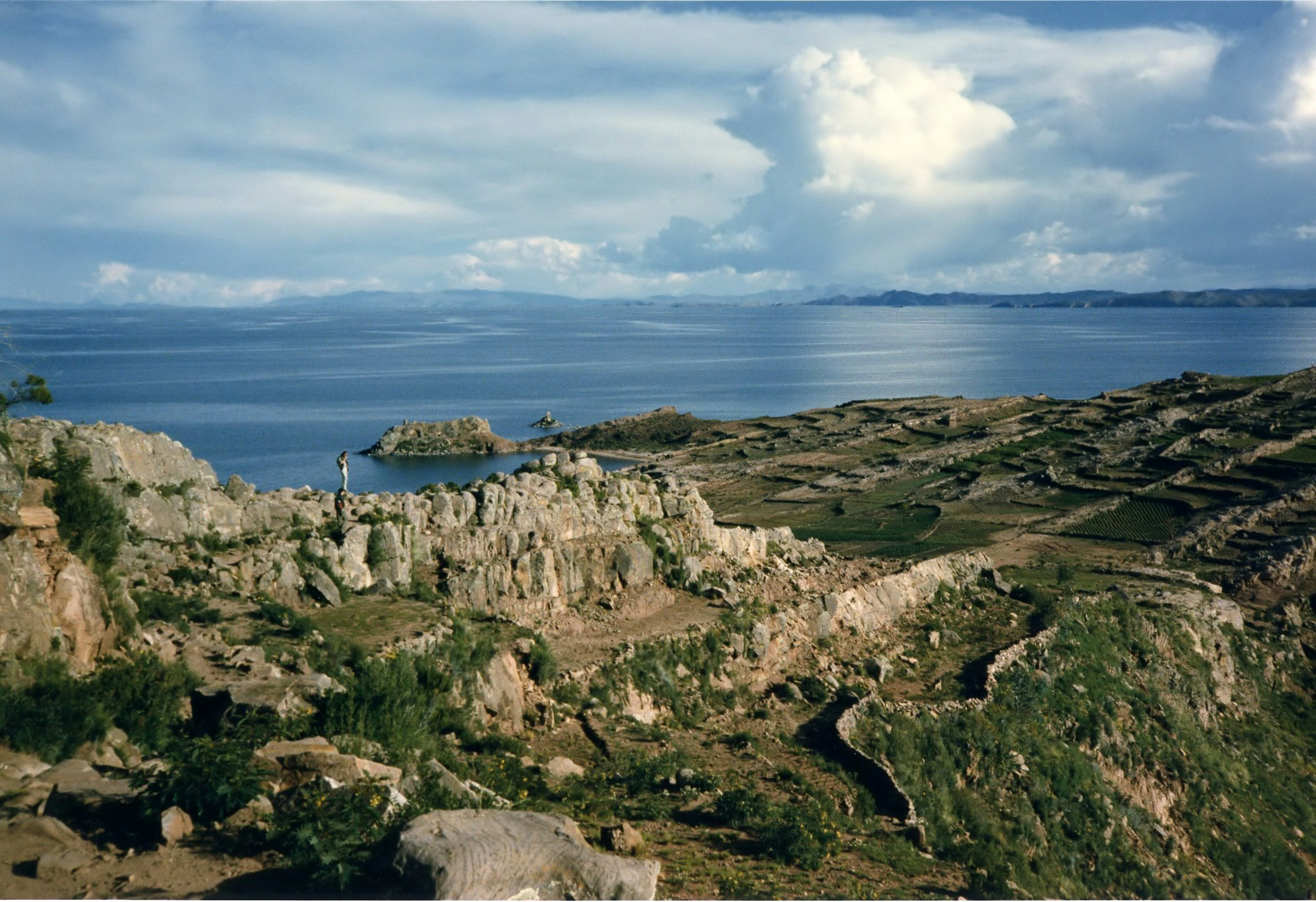
Taquile Island in Peru

Taquile is a hilly island on the Peruvian side of the lake and is located 45 km (28 mi) east of Puno. It is narrow and long and was used as a prison during the Spanish Colony and into the 20th century. In 1970, it became property of the Taquile people, who have inhabited the island since then. The current population is around 2,200. The island is 5.5 by 1.6 km (3.42 by 0.99 mi) in size (maximum measurements), with an area of 5.72 km^{2} (2.21 sq mi). The highest point of the island is 4,050 m (13,290 ft) above sea level, and the main village is at 3,950 m (12,960 ft). Pre-Inca ruins are found on the highest part of the island, and agricultural terraces on hillsides. From the hillsides of Taquile, one has a view of the tops of Bolivian mountains. The inhabitants, known as Taquileños, are southern Quechua speakers.

Taquile is especially known for its handicraft tradition, which is regarded as being of the highest quality. "Taquile and Its Textile Art" were honored by being proclaimed "Masterpieces of the Oral and Intangible Heritage of Humanity" by UNESCO. Knitting is exclusively performed by males, starting at age eight. The women exclusively make yarn and weave.

Taquileans are also known for having created an innovative, community-controlled tourism model, offering home stays, transportation, and restaurants to tourists. Ever since tourism started coming to Taquile in the 1970s, the Taquileños have slowly lost control over the mass day-tourism operated by non-Taquileans. They have thus developed alternative tourism models, including lodging for groups, cultural activities, and local guides who have completed a 2-year training program. The local Travel Agency, Munay Taquile, has been established to regain control over tourism.

The people in Taquile run their society based on community collectivism and on the Inca moral code ama sua, ama llulla, ama qhilla, (do not steal, do not lie, do not be lazy). The island is divided into six sectors or suyus for crop rotation purposes. The economy is based on fishing, terraced farming based on potato cultivation, and tourist-generated income from the roughly 40,000 tourists who visit each year.

=== Suriqui ===
Suriqui Island lies in the Bolivian part of lake Titicaca (in the southeastern part also known as lake Wiñaymarka).

Suriqui is thought to be the last place where the art of reed boat construction survives, at least as late as 1998. Craftsmen from Suriqui helped Thor Heyerdahl in the construction of several of his projects, such as the reed boats Ra II and Tigris, and a balloon gondola.

== Transport ==
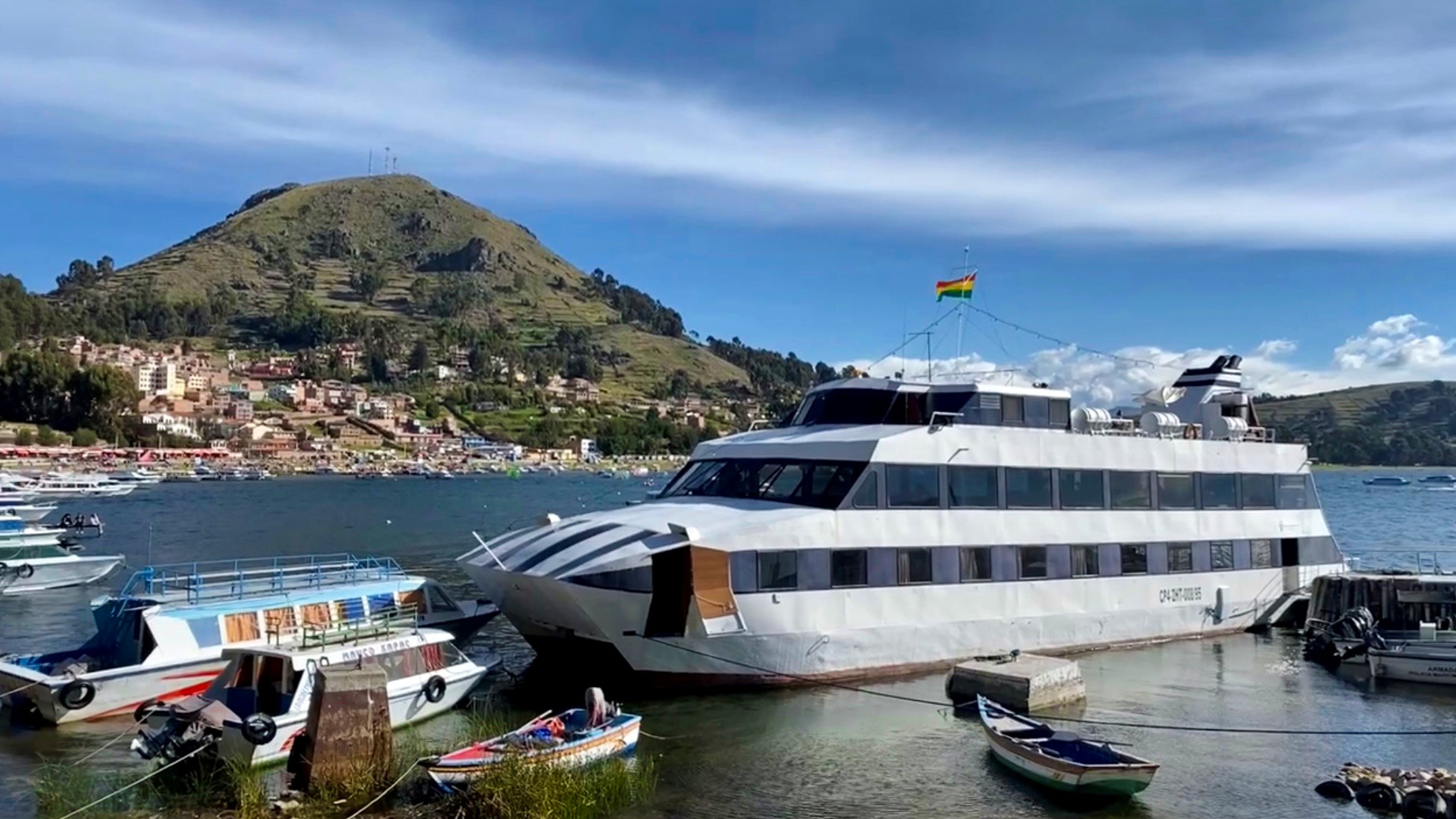
Ferries and fishing boats in the port of Copacabana

The dual gauge car float Manco Capac links PeruRail's 1,435 mm (4 ft 8 1/2 in) standard gauge line at Puno with the Bolivian railways' 1,000 mm (3 ft 3 3/8 in) meter gauge line at Guaqui.

=== History ===
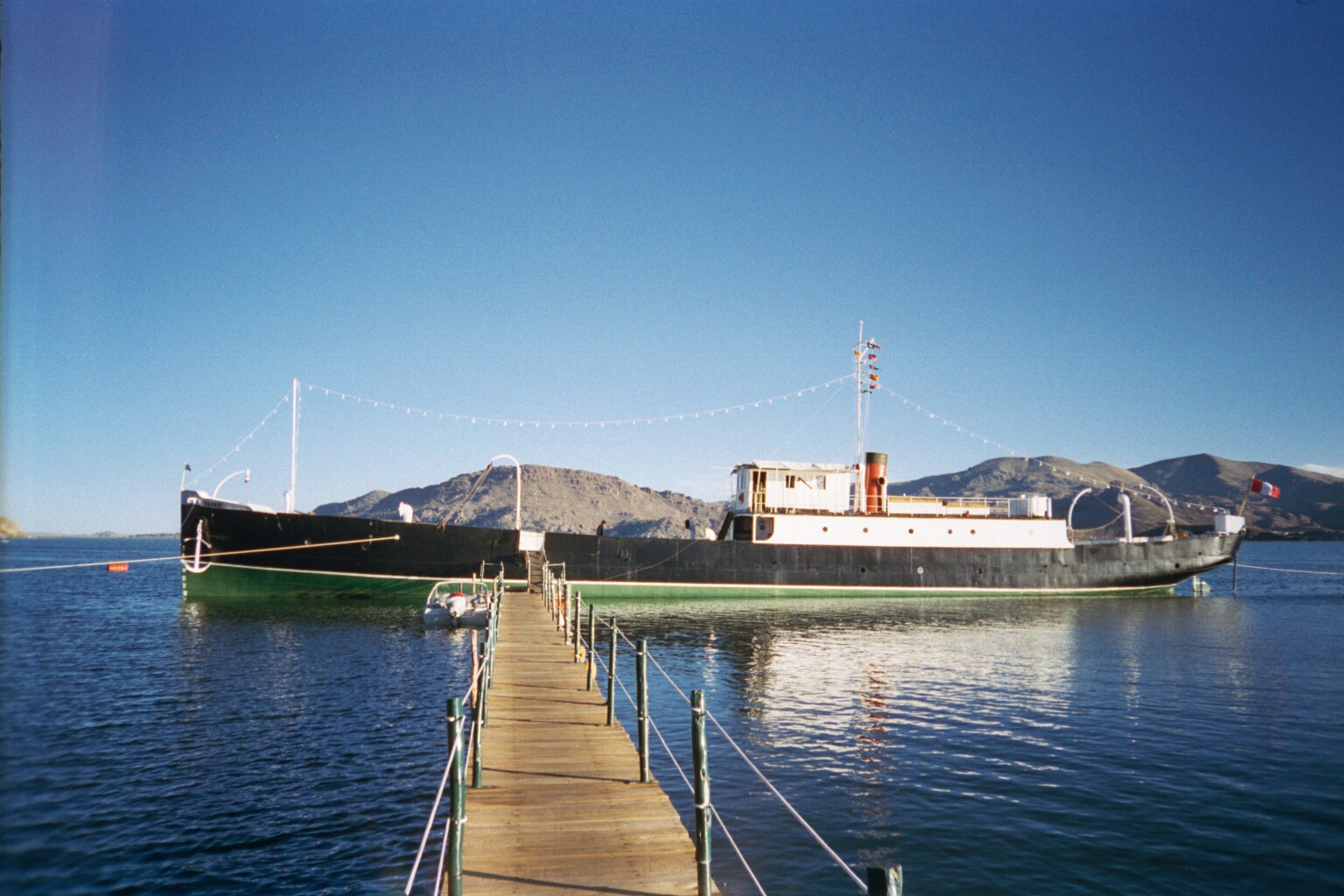
SS Yavari in Puno, 2002

The lake has had a number of steamships, each of which was built in the United Kingdom in "knock down" form with bolts and nuts, disassembled into many hundreds of pieces, transported to the lake, and then riveted together and launched.

In 1862 Thames Ironworks on the River Thames built the iron-hulled sister ships SS Yavari and SS Yapura under contract to the James Watt Foundry of Birmingham. The ships were designed as combined cargo, passenger, and gunboats for the Peruvian Navy. After several years' delay in delivery from the Pacific coast to the lake, Yavari was launched in 1870 and Yapura in 1873. Yavari was 30 m (100 ft) long, but in 1914 her hull was lengthened for extra cargo capacity and she was re-engined as a motor vessel.

In November 1883, during the final phase of the War of the Pacific, the Chilean military command sent the Chilean torpedo boat Colo Colo to the lake, via railroad, from Mollendo to Puno to control the area. It was the first warship to navigate the lake.

In 1892, William Denny and Brothers at Dumbarton on the River Clyde in Scotland built SS Coya. She was 52 m (170 ft) long and was launched on the lake in 1893.

In 1905, Earle's Shipbuilding at Kingston upon Hull on the Humber built SS Inca. By then, a railway served the lake, so the ship was delivered in kit form by rail. At 67 m (220 ft) long and 1,809 tons (1,994 U.S. tons), Inca was the lake's largest ship thus far. In the 1920s, Earle's supplied a new bottom for the ship, which also was delivered in kit form.

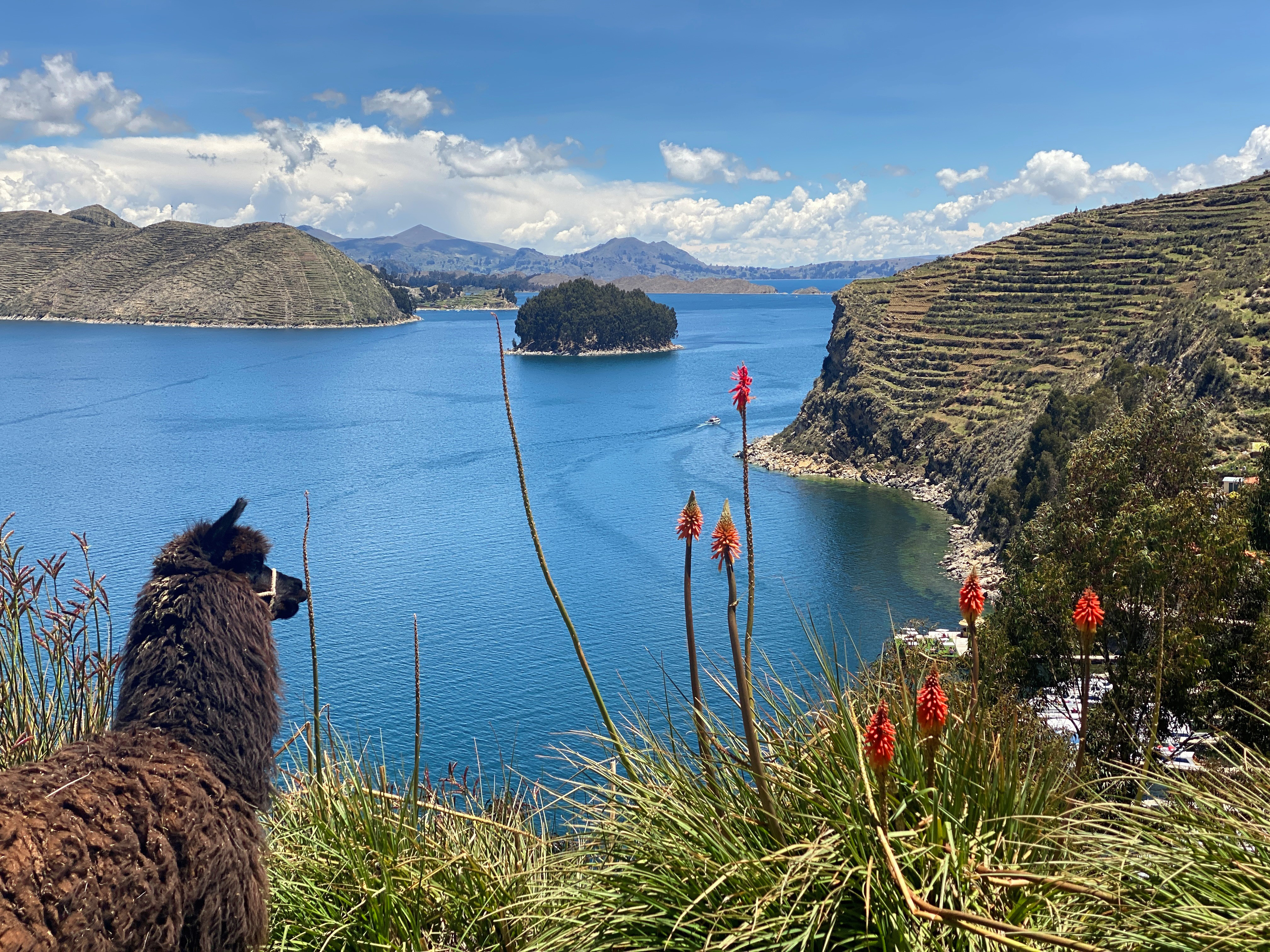
A view of Lake Titicaca and Chelleca island in the background. Alpacas are a common sight along the shores of the lake.

Trade continued to grow, so in 1930, Earle's built SS Ollanta. Her parts were landed at the Pacific Ocean port of Mollendo and brought by rail to the lake port of Puno. At 79 m (260 ft) long and 2,200 tons (425 U.S. tons), she was considerably larger than the Inca, so first a new slipway had to be built to build her. She was launched in November 1931.

In 1975, Yavari and Yapura were returned to the Peruvian Navy, which converted Yapura into a hospital ship and renamed her BAP Puno. The Navy discarded Yavari, but in 1987, charitable interests bought her and started restoring her. She is now moored at Puno Bay and provides static tourist accommodation while her restoration continues. Coya was beached in 1984, but restored as a floating restaurant in 2001. Inca survived until 1994, when she was broken up. Ollanta is no longer in scheduled service, but PeruRail has been leasing her for tourist charter operations.

== See also ==
- Chiripa culture
- Extremes on Earth
- Ilave River
- Sacred waters
- Taraco Peninsula
- Titicaca National Reservation
- Tourism in Bolivia
- Tourism in Peru
- Yampupata Peninsula
