= BAP Puno =

Peruvian Navy hospital ship

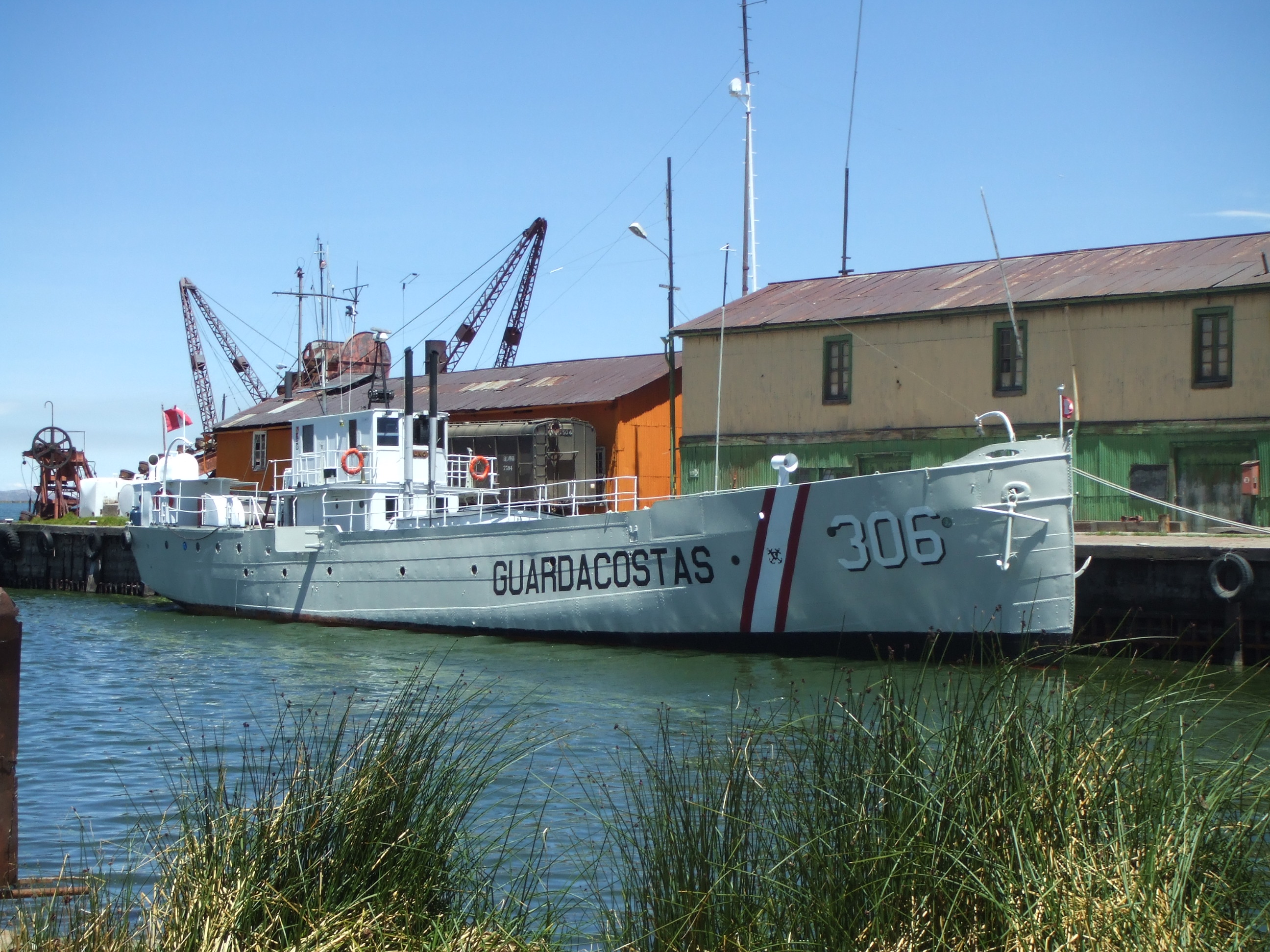
- BAP Puno in her namesake port of Puno

History

Peru
- Name: Yapura (1872–1976)
- Namesake: Puno
- Owner: Peruvian Navy
- Ordered: 1861
- Builder: Thames Ironworks and Shipbuilding Company
- Laid down: 1861
- Launched: 1872
- Commissioned: May 18, 1872
- Renamed: BAP Puno since 1976
- Status: In service

General characteristics
- Class & type: Yavarí class gunboat
- Displacement: 140 tons
- Length: 100 ft (30 m)
- Speed: 10 knots (19 km/h)
- Notes: Capacity for 180 tonnes of cargo

BAP Puno (ABH-306) is a Peruvian Navy hospital ship on Lake Titicaca. Until 1976 she was called Yapura. She is named after the Yapura River (or Caqueta River) that flows into the Amazon River in Department of Loreto, Peru. The Yapura river was the former border between Peru and Colombia in the Amazonia. It was an iron steam ship commissioned (along with her sister ship Yavarí) by the Peruvian government in 1861 for use on the lake by the Peruvian Navy. She is one of the oldest operational iron-hulled ships in the world, and is the oldest first-line military ship.

== Construction ==
The Peruvian government led by Ramón Castilla ordered Yapura and her sister ship Yavari in 1861. In 1862 Thames Ironworks on the River Thames built the iron-hulled Yavari and Yapura under contract to the James Watt Foundry of Birmingham. The ships were designed as combined cargo, passenger and gunboats for the Peruvian Navy. Puno has her original 60 horsepower (45 kW) two-cylinder steam engine, which is fuelled with dried llama dung.

The ships were built in "knock down" form; that is, they were assembled with bolts and nuts at the shipyard, dismantled into thousands of parts small enough to transport, and shipped to their final destination to be assembled with rivets and launched on the lake. The kits for the two ships consisted of a total 2,766 pieces between them. Each piece was no more than 3.5. cwt—what a mule could carry(C. 177 kg)—because the railway from the Pacific Ocean port of Arica went only 40 miles (64 km), as far as Tacna. From there pack mules had to carry them the remaining 220 miles (350 km) to Puno on the lake.

The original British contractor got the parts to Tacna but failed to complete the section of the journey with mules. This was not resumed until 1868 and Yapura was not launched until 1873. The Peruvian Corporation carried out two important remodellings to the original ship: between 1927 and 1929 it elevated the propeller, taking care not to spoil its gauge; and in 1956 it changed the old engine for a Paxman Ricardo of English manufacture (1948) with 12 cylinders in V, with a power of 410 HP allowing a speed of 10 knots.

== Service history ==
On May 2, 1873, the "Yapurá" sailed for the first time in the Titicaca Lake under the command of corvette captain Manuel Mariano Melgar.

Even though peace had already been signed with the Treaty of Ancón between Peru and Chile to end the War of the Pacific on October 20, 1883, Rear Admiral Lizardo Montero and General César Canevaro resisted in Arequipa. Pursued by Chilean forces, they retreated to Puno and negotiated more support from Bolivia. Upon reaching Puno, on the shore of Titicaca, they boarded with their men the steam gunboats Yavarí and Yapurá, to sail towards the lake port of Chililaya, in Bolivia, where General Narciso Campero was waiting for them with two Bolivian battalions to resume hostilities against Chile.

However, a Chilean division arrived in Puno on November 4, 1883 and its local authorities immediately handed over the place, declaring themselves in favor of peace and the government of Miguel Iglesias. The Chilean forces transported by rail from the port of Mollendo to Puno the torpedo boat Colo Colo and launched it into the waters of Lake Titicaca, where it carried out patrolling operations to prevent communications, control the guerrillas and the military use of the lake.

By the end of the war the Peruvian government was impoverished, so in 1890 UK investors established the Peruvian Corporation which took over the concession to operate Peru's railways and lake ships. In 1975 Peru nationalised the corporation and Yavari and Yapura passed to the state railway company ENAFER. In 1976 they were transferred back the Peruvian Navy, and renamed as BAP Puno, the name of the locality of its Base port, and assigning it to passenger and cargo transportation tasks and as a Coast Guard of lake naval force. In 1993, the BAP Puno was converted into a hospital ship and renamed BAP Puno.

== Bibliography ==
- Notari, Carlos Méndez (2013). "A Naval Operation on Lake Titicaca". Warship International. L (1): 79–82. ISSN 0043-0374.
