= Jach'a Jawira (Caquiaviri) =

- Etymology: Aymara

Location
- Country: Bolivia
- Region: La Paz Department, Pacajes Province, Caquiaviri Municipality

Physical characteristics
- Source
  - location: Caquiaviri Municipality
- Mouth
  - location: Caquiaviri Municipality
  - coordinates: 16°57′45″S 68°47′15″W

Jach'a Jawira (Aymara jach'a big, jawira river, "big river", also spelled Jachcha Jahuira) is a Bolivian river in the La Paz Department, Pacajes Province, Caquiaviri Municipality. It is a left tributary of the Desaguadero River.

Jach'a Jawira originates in the mountains near Caquiaviri. At first it flows to the northwest, then it turns to the west where it joins the Desaguaderdo River south of the village of Nasa Q'ara (Nazacara).

== See also ==
- Qala Jawira
- Thujsa Jawira
