= Qala Jawira =

- Etymology: Aymara

Location
- Country: Bolivia
- Region: La Paz Department, Pacajes Province

Physical characteristics
- Source
  - location: Caquiaviri Municipality
- Mouth
  - location: Caquiaviri Municipality
  - coordinates: 16°56′22″S 68°46′01″W

Qala Jawira (Aymara qala stone, jawira river, "stone river", also spelled Khala Jahuira) which upstream is named Laka Jaqhi (Lakajakke) is a river in the La Paz Department in Bolivia. It is a left tributary of the Desaguadero River.

Qala Jawira originates from various streams of the mountains in the east of the Caquiaviri Municipality of the Pacajes Province. It flows to the west along the village of Qullqipata (Colquepata, Kolque Pata) until it empties into the Desaguaderdo River in the south of the village of Nasa Q'ara (Nazacara).

== See also ==
- Jach'a Jawira
- Thujsa Jawira
