= Mataro (ancient lake) =

Lake Mataro is an ancient lake in the Andes. It formed over the northern Altiplano at an altitude of 3,950 metres (12,960 ft) and extended over the central Altiplano. It is one of the ancient lakes of the Altiplano like Lake Minchin, Lake Ballivian and Lake Cabana. It existed between 2.8 and 1.8 million years ago.

The Altiplano is a 200,000 square kilometres (77,000 sq mi) highland in South America, between the Eastern Cordillera and the Western Cordillera of the Andes. The most important lacustrine bodies of today are Lake Titicaca, Lake Poopo, Salar de Coipasa and Salar de Uyuni. During summer the ITCZ moves south and brings precipitation to the Altiplano, with the amount decreasing from north to south. In the past, several large lakes formed in the Altiplano, including Lake Minchin, Lake Ballivian, Lake Cabana and Lake Mataro. Additional ancient lakes have been identified. A tectonic event resulting into a relative uplift of the Eastern Cordillera with respect to the Altiplano may have triggered a lowering of the terrain and facilitated the formation of Mataro and Cabana.

River sediments consisting of 50 metres (160 ft) thick deposits of clay, gravel and sand have been left by Lake Mataro. Deposits of the lake have been found mostly in the northeastern part of its basin and the lake is named after an outcrop in the Mataro Chico locality. The erosion surface of Lake Mataro and Lake Cabana is found in both the northern and central Altiplano, implying that the Ulloma-Capalla pass did not exist back then.

Lake Mataro has been identified in the northern Altiplano, where deposits from this stage are found at an altitude of 3,950 metres (12,960 ft). For comparison, Lake Cabana deposits are found at altitudes of 3,900 metres (12,800 ft) and Lake Ballivian at an altitude of 3,860 metres (12,660 ft). Both Mataro and Cabana were named by Lavenu and others in 1984. The height of Lake Mataro was 140 metres (460 ft) above that of Lake Titicaca. It formed a single large lake over the central and northern Altiplano. Progressive erosion of the outlet of Lake Titicaca may be responsible for the observed reduction of the levels of the northern paleolakes during time, as it allowed water from the northern lakes to spill into the southern ones.

Lake Mataro along with Lake Cabana and Lake Ballivian was first debatably dated to be late Pliocene-mid/early Quaternary in age. Proposed ages include 1.8 and 2.8 million years ago, lake deposits lie on top of a 2.8 ± 0.4 million years old volcanic ash layer. The Mataro formation has been dated at 1.6 million years ago.

The lake existed at the same time as the Calvario glaciation over 2.8 million years ago, when the glaciation was ending. The Ayo Ayo and Purapurani formations are coeval with the existence of Lake Mataro, as is the differentiation of Hyalella amphipods; these are freshwater animals.
