= Utani Apu =

Mountain in Bolivia

- Location within Bolivia

Highest point
- Elevation: 4,060 m (13,320 ft)
- Coordinates: 17°03′40″S 68°55′33″W

Geography
- Location: Bolivia, La Paz Department
- Parent range: Andes

Utani Apu (Aymara) is a 4,060 m (13,320 ft) mountain in the Andes of Bolivia. It is located in the La Paz Department, Ingavi Province, San Andrés de Machaca Municipality, and in the Pacajes Province, Caquiaviri Municipality.
