= Desaguadero River (Bolivia and Peru) =

Desaguadero
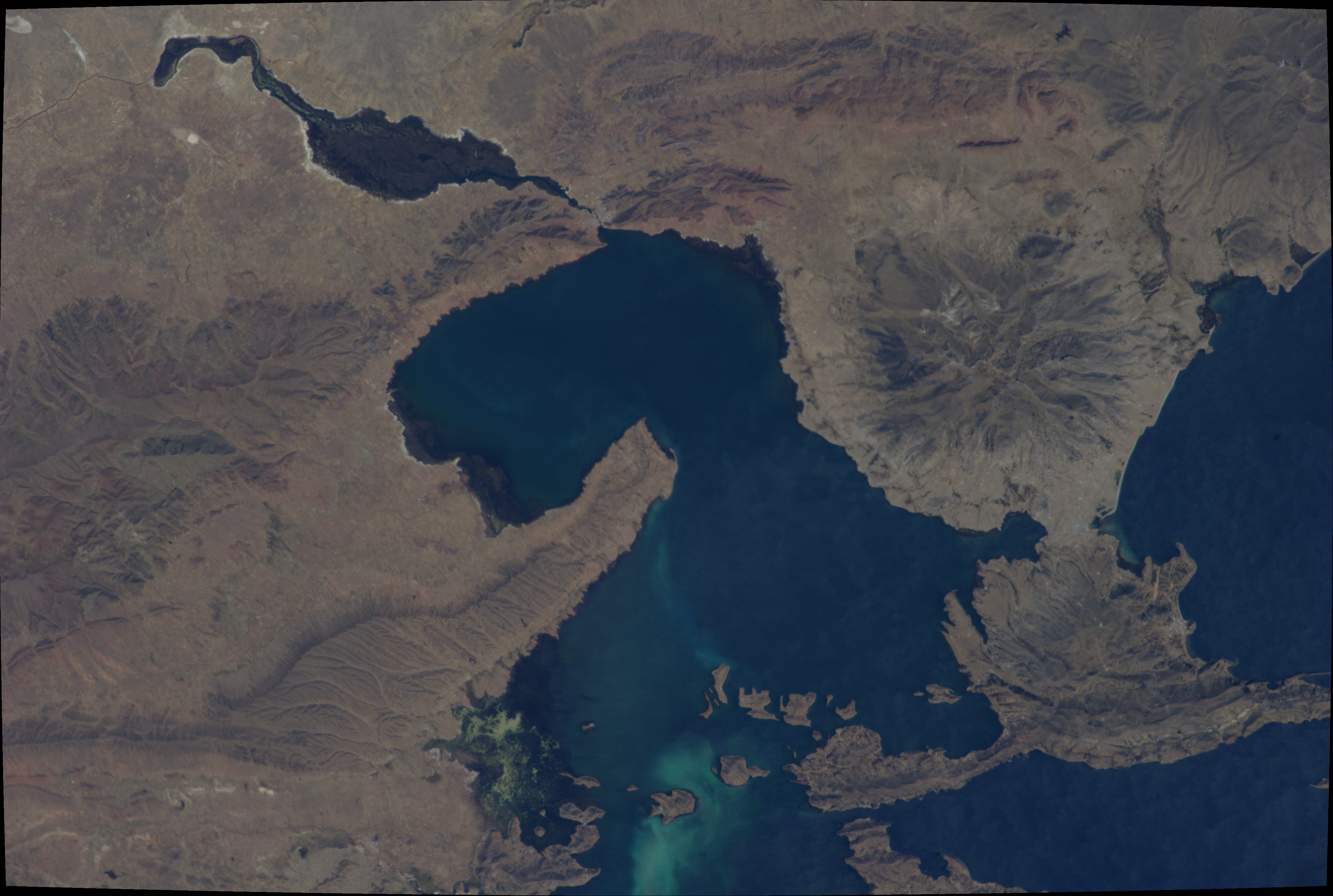
- The Desaguadero River at its origin as seen from the ISS (upper center, left; north is to the lower right part of this image)

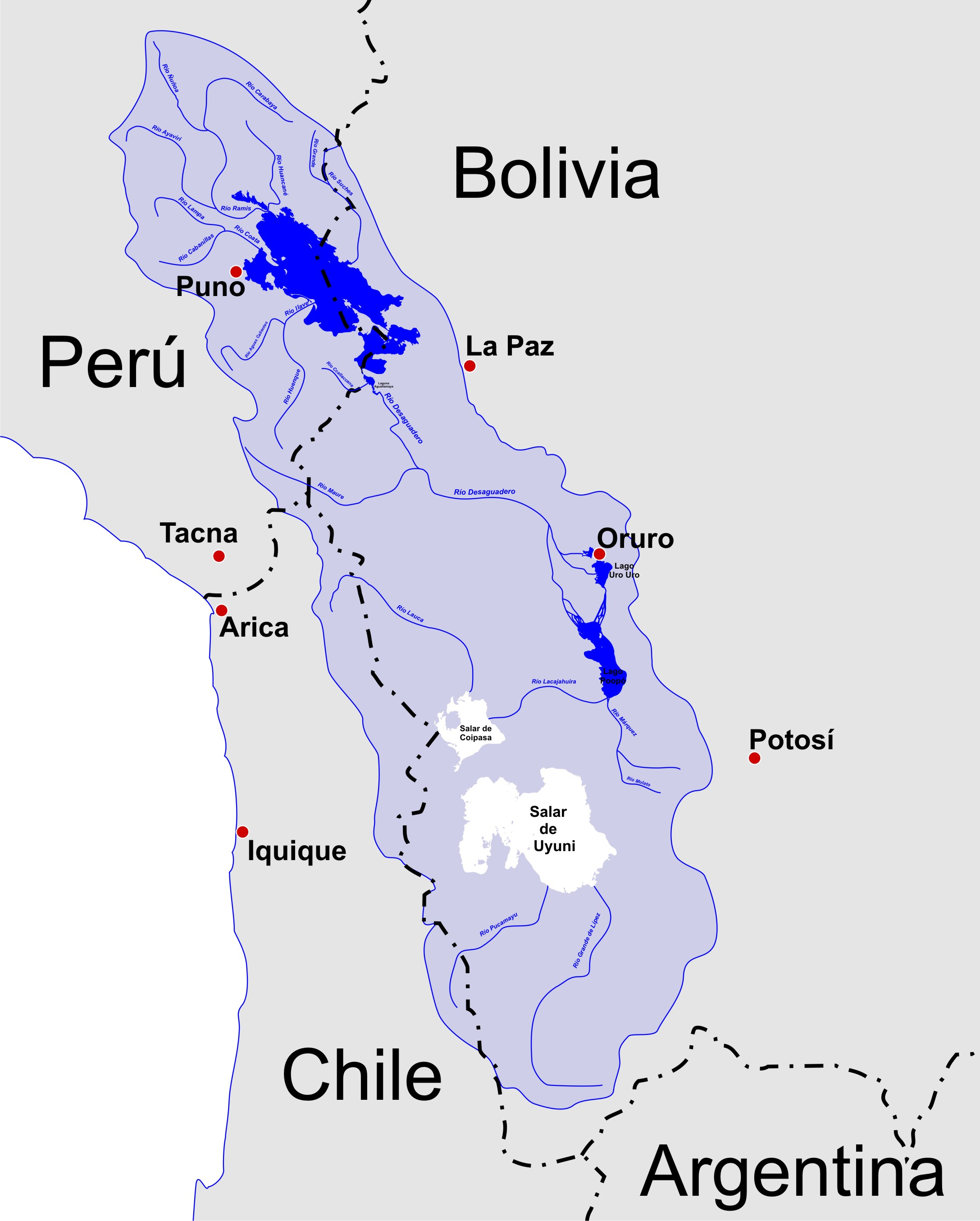
- Sketch map of the area showing Desaguadero River

Location
- Country: Peru, Bolivia
- Region: Altiplano
- Cities: Desaguadero, San Andrés, Oruro

Physical characteristics
- Source: Lake Titicaca
  - location: Desaguadero, Peru
  - coordinates: 16°33′49″S 69°02′11″W
  - elevation: 3,811 m (12,503 ft)
- Mouth: Poopó Lake
  - location: 50 kilometres (31 mi) S of Oruro, Bolivia
  - coordinates: 18°26′31″S 67°04′22″W
  - elevation: 3,686 m (12,093 ft)
- Length: 320 km (200 mi)
- Basin size: 90,000 km^{2} (35,000 sq mi)approx.
- Discharge
  - location: Ulloma
  - average: 78 m^{3}/s (2,800 cu ft/s)
  - minimum: 28 m^{3}/s (990 cu ft/s)
  - maximum: 282 m^{3}/s (10,000 cu ft/s)

Basin features
- Tributaries
  - left: Ch'alla Jawira, Llallawa Jawira, Jach'a Jawira (Caquiaviri), Thujsa Jawira, Qala Jawira, Jach'a Jawira (Ingavi)
  - right: Qullpa Jawira

The Desaguadero River, also known as Risawariru or Uchusumain, is a river shared between Bolivia and Peru. It drains Lake Titicaca from the southern part of the river basin, flowing south and draining approximately five percent of the lake's flood waters into Lake Uru Uru and Lake Poopó. Its source in the north is very near the Peruvian border.

It is navigable only by small craft and supports indigenous communities such as the Uru Muratu community.

== See also ==
- Awallamaya Lake
- Desaguadero River (Argentina) from Argentina.
