= San Andrés de Machaca Municipality =

- Municipality
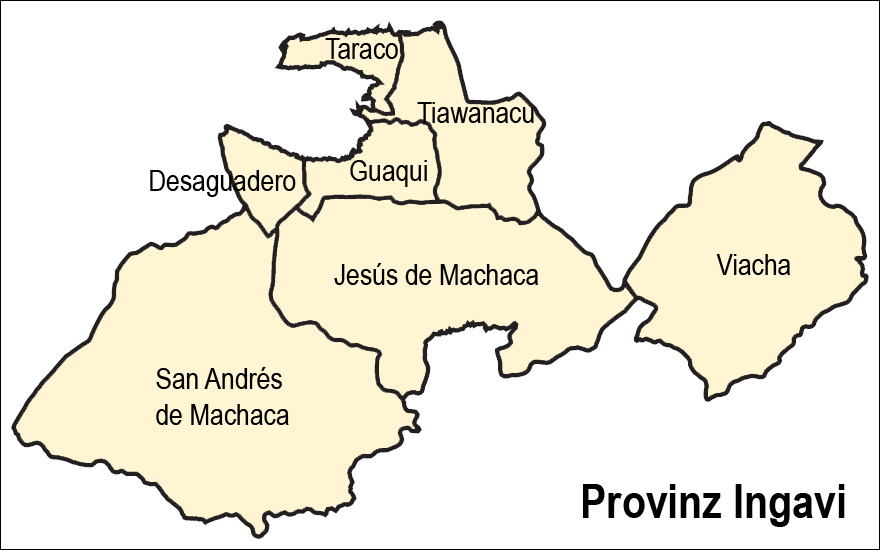
- Location of the municipality within Ingavi province

- Location of the San Andrés de Machaca Municipality within Bolivia
- Coordinates: 16°54′0″S 69°3′0″W
- Country: Bolivia
- Department: La Paz Department
- Province: Ingavi Province
- Seat: San Andrés de Machaca

Government
  - Mayor: Erasmo Ticona Quenta (2008)
  - President: Filomena Sarzuri Cruz (2008)

Area
  - Total: 580 sq mi (1,502 km^{2})

Population (2001)
  - Total: 6,299
- Time zone: UTC-4 (BOT)

San Andrés de Machaca Municipality is the fifth municipal section of the Ingavi Province in the La Paz Department, Bolivia. Its seat is San Andrés de Machaca.

== Division ==
The municipality consists of the following 9 cantons:

- Chuncarcota de Machaca - 400 inhabitants (2001)
- Conchacollo de Machaca - 915 inhabitants
- Laquinamaya - 1.089 inhabitants
- Mauri - 616 inhabitants
- Nazacara - 494 inhabitants
- San Andrés de Machaca - 1.344 inhabitants
- Sombra Pata - 262 inhabitants
- Villa Artasivi de Machaca - 873 inhabitants
- Villa Pusuma Alto de Machaca - 317 inhabitants

== The people ==
The people are predominantly indigenous citizens of Aymara descent.

| Ethnic group | % |
|---|---|
| Quechua | 0.3 |
| Aymara | 96.0 |
| Guaraní, Chiquitos, Moxos | 0.1 |
| Not indigenous | 3.3 |
| Other indigenous groups | 0.4 |

== Places of interest ==
Some of the tourist attractions of the municipality are:

- Afiani lagoon in San Andrés de Machaca Canton
- The chullpa of Kañoma in San Andrés de Machaca Canton
- The church of San Andrés de Machaca, built between 1806 and 1836

== See also ==
- Qullpa Jawira
- Thujsa Jawira
- Utani Apu
