= Caquiaviri =

- Town
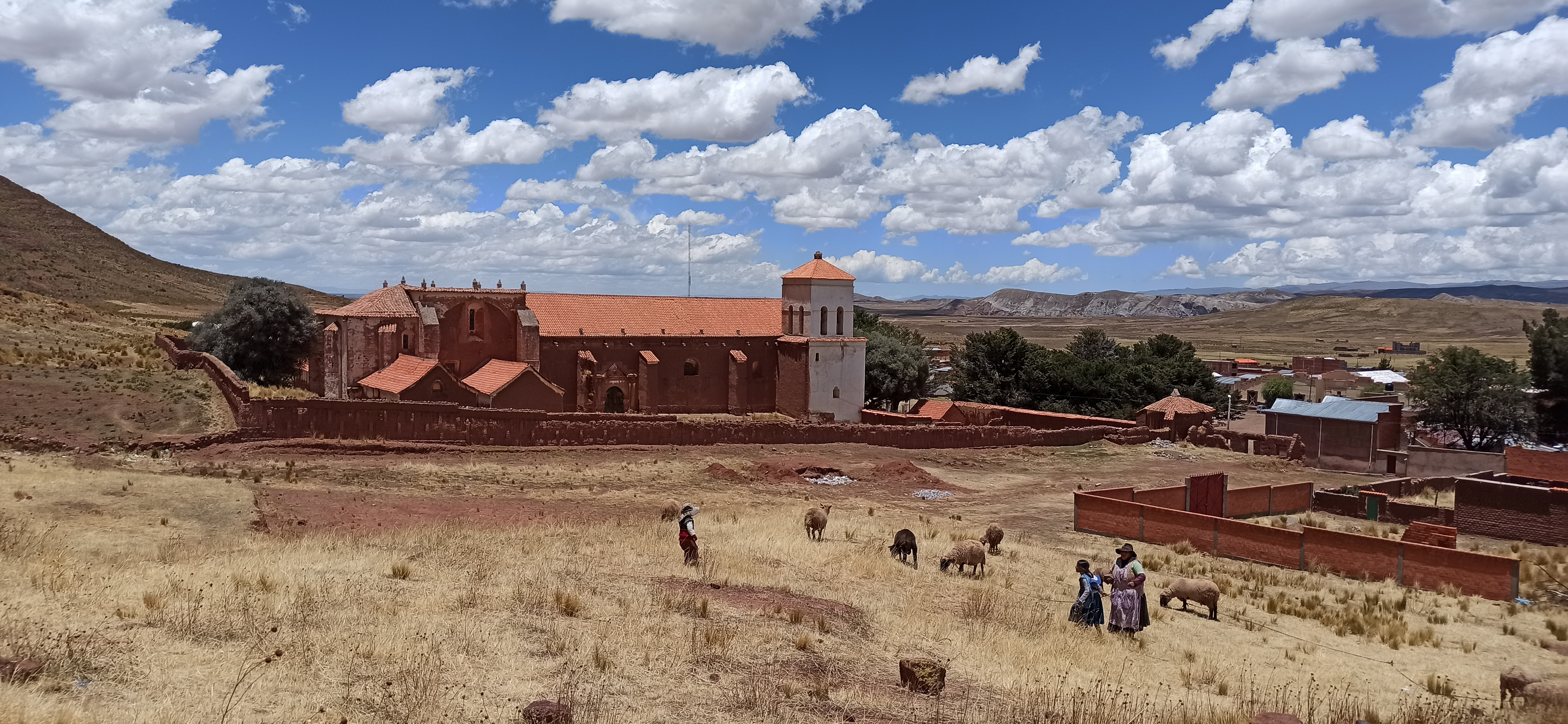
- The church of Caquiaviri
- Interactive map of Caquiaviri
- Coordinates: 17°01′S 68°36′W
- Country: Bolivia
- Department: La Paz Department
- Province: Pacajes Province
- Municipality: Caquiaviri Municipality

Population (2001)
  - Total: 399
- Time zone: UTC-4 (BOT)

Caquiaviri is a town in the La Paz Department in Bolivia. It is the seat of the Caquiaviri Municipality, the second municipal section of the Pacajes Province.

== Climate ==
Climate data for Caquiaviri, elevation 3,951 m (12,963 ft), (1976–2010)
Month	Jan	Feb	Mar	Apr	May	Jun	Jul	Aug	Sep	Oct	Nov	Dec	Year
Mean daily maximum °C (°F)	17.1 (62.8)	16.9 (62.4)	16.7 (62.1)	17.0 (62.6)	16.5 (61.7)	16.4 (61.5)	15.5 (59.9)	16.4 (61.5)	17.6 (63.7)	18.4 (65.1)	18.9 (66.0)	18.7 (65.7)	17.2 (62.9)
Daily mean °C (°F)	9.5 (49.1)	9.4 (48.9)	9.1 (48.4)	7.9 (46.2)	6.2 (43.2)	5.4 (41.7)	4.0 (39.2)	4.8 (40.6)	5.9 (42.6)	7.7 (45.9)	8.8 (47.8)	9.9 (49.8)	7.4 (45.3)
Mean daily minimum °C (°F)	1.9 (35.4)	1.9 (35.4)	1.6 (34.9)	−1.2 (29.8)	−4.2 (24.4)	−5.6 (21.9)	−7.5 (18.5)	−6.7 (19.9)	−5.8 (21.6)	−3.0 (26.6)	−1.3 (29.7)	1.0 (33.8)	−2.4 (27.7)
Average precipitation mm (inches)	108.8 (4.28)	97.6 (3.84)	74.3 (2.93)	32.5 (1.28)	11.5 (0.45)	6.6 (0.26)	8.3 (0.33)	16.2 (0.64)	21.8 (0.86)	26.4 (1.04)	38.2 (1.50)	63.7 (2.51)	505.9 (19.92)
Average precipitation days	15.2	12.3	11.2	5.6	2.4	1.3	1.6	2.8	3.4	4.6	5.8	9.6	75.8
Average relative humidity (%)	47.3	50.0	49.4	44.3	46.1	44.6	43.5	42.0	41.6	41.1	42.5	42.6	44.6
Source: Servicio Nacional de Meteorología e Hidrología de Bolivia
