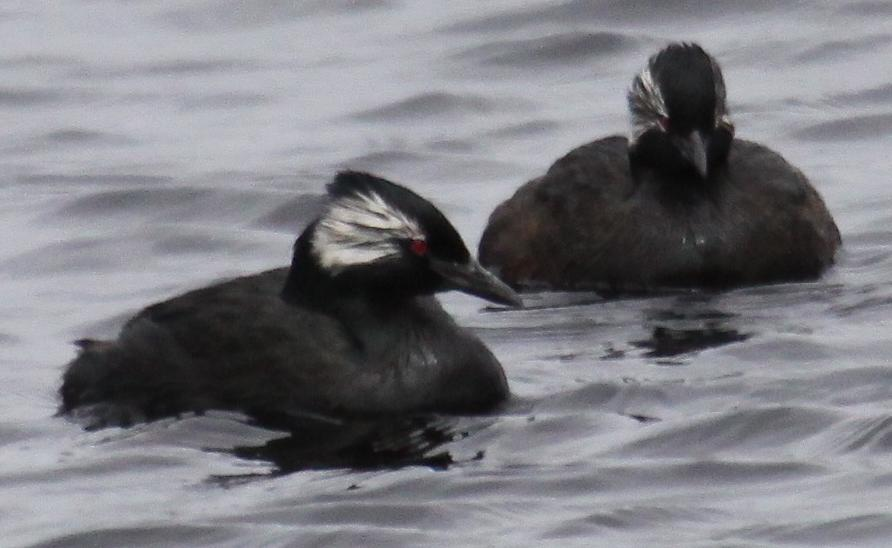
- White-tufted grebe, Rollandia rolland

Scientific classification
- Kingdom: Animalia
- Phylum: Chordata
- Class: Aves
- Order: Podicipediformes
- Family: Podicipedidae
- Genus: Rollandia; Bonaparte, 1856

Type species
- Rollandia leucotis Bonaparte, 1856

Species
- R. rolland R. microptera

= Rollandia (bird) =

Genus of birds

Rollandia is a small genus of birds in the grebe family. Its two members are found in South America.

== Species ==
They are:

Genus Rollandia – Bonaparte, 1856 – two species
| Common name | Scientific name and subspecies | Range | Size and ecology | IUCN status and estimated population |
|---|---|---|---|---|
| White-tufted grebe | Rollandia rolland (Gaimard, 1823) Three subspecies: R. r. chilensis (Lesson, 1828); R. r. morrisoni (Simmons, 1962); R. r. rolland (Gaimard, 1823) | Peru and southeast Brazil southwards to Cape Horn and Tierra del Fuego. | Size: Habitat: Diet: | LC |
| Titicaca grebe | Rollandia microptera (Gould, 1868) | Peru and Bolivia. | Size: Habitat: Diet: | EN |
