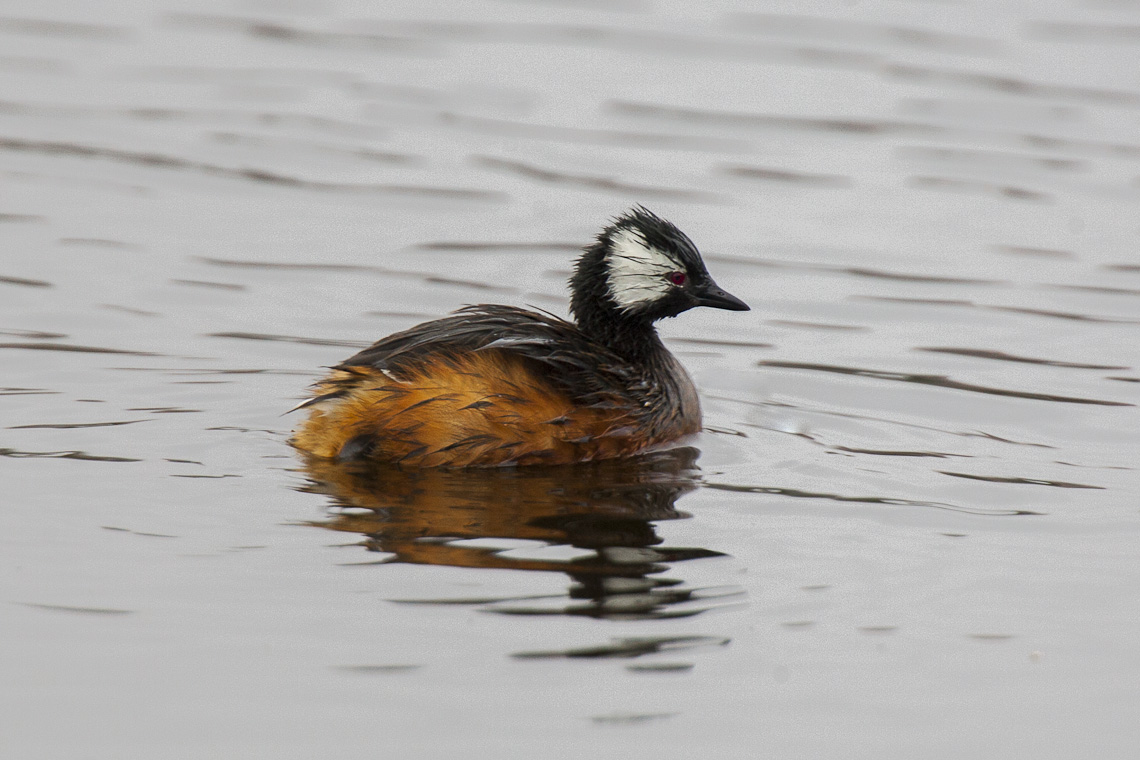
- White-tufted grebe in Lima, Peru

Conservation status
- Least Concern (IUCN 3.1)

Scientific classification
- Kingdom: Animalia
- Phylum: Chordata
- Class: Aves
- Order: Podicipediformes
- Family: Podicipedidae
- Genus: Rollandia
- Species: R. rolland

Binomial name
- Rollandia rolland (Gaimard, 1823)

= White-tufted grebe =

Species of bird

The white-tufted grebe (Rollandia rolland), also known as Rolland's grebe, is a species of grebe in the family Podicipedidae. Found in the southern and western South America, its natural habitat is freshwater lakes, ponds and sluggish rivers and streams.

== Taxonomy ==
Three subspecies are recognised:

- R. r. chilensis (Lesson, 1828) – Southern and western Peru and southeast Brazil southwards to Cape Horn and Tierra del Fuego.
- R. r. morrisoni (Simmons, 1962) – Lake Junin in the Andean highlands of central Peru.
- R. r. rolland (Gaimard, 1823) – Falkland Islands.

The most notable difference between the subspecies is their sizes. R. r. rolland is almost flightless, and considerably larger (typically weighs about twice as much as R. r. chilensis) and with deeper rufous underparts than the other two subspecies. R. r. chilensis and R. r. morrisoni are very similar, but the former is on average smaller than the latter. R. r. rolland also has certain behavioral differences, including related to display and breeding. Historically it was often recognized as a separate species, to which the common name Rolland's grebe has been applied (leaving the name white-tufted grebe for the South American mainland species), and some recent authorities have supported its return to status as a separate species.

== Description ==
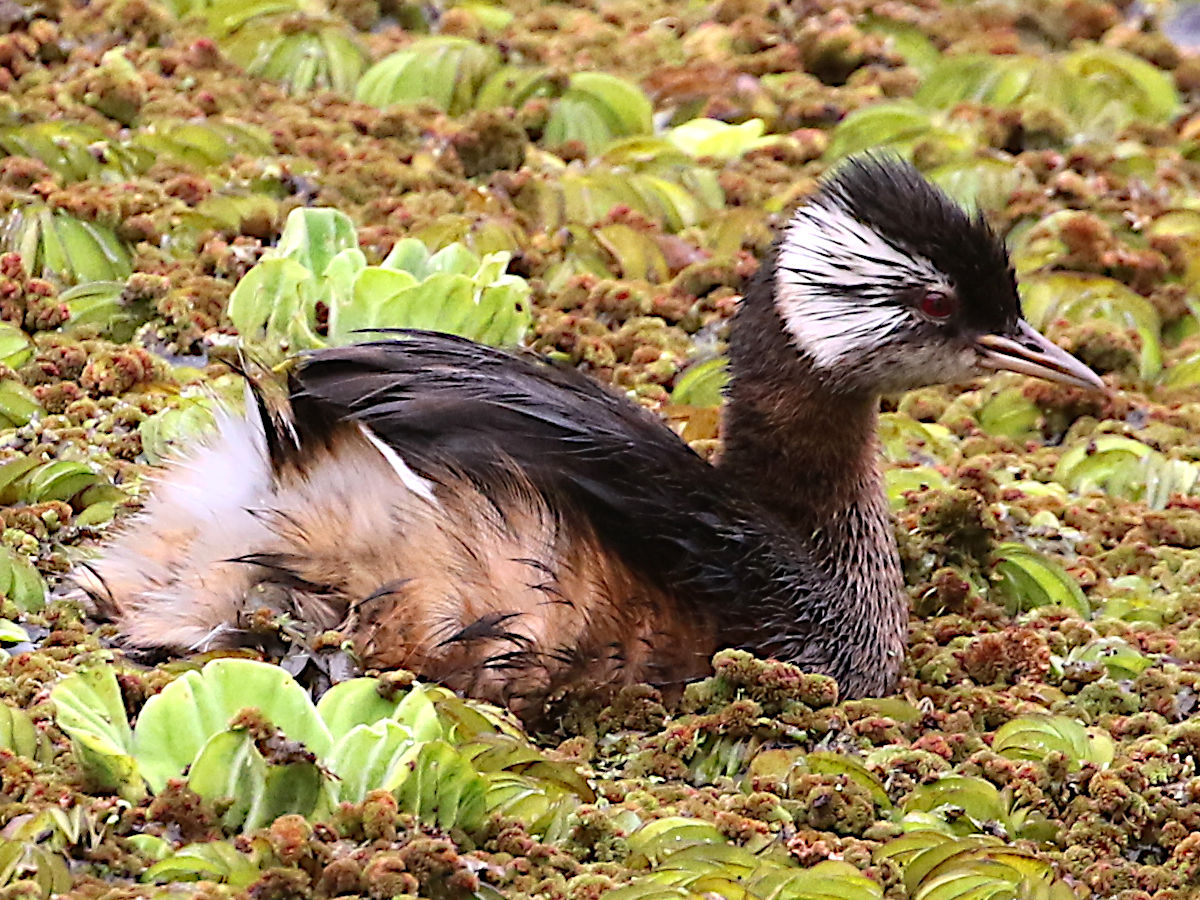
In the Costanera Sur Ecological Reserve, Argentina

The male and female white-tufted grebe look alike and are between 24 and 36 cm (9.4–14.2 in) in length, with lower and medium measurements being typical for the South American mainland populations and upper measurements typical for the Falkland population. Adults in breeding plumage have a prominent black crest on the back of their heads. There is a large white tuft of feathers around the ear but otherwise the head, neck and back are black, with a slight greenish sheen, and the feathers of the mantle and back are narrowly bordered with brown. The underparts are a dull reddish-brown, often mottled with brown or grey. The secondary wing feathers are white, pale grey or have white tips. The eye is red, the beak black and the legs grey or olive-brown. Adults in non-breeding plumage are dark brown rather than black. The crest becomes inconspicuous, the sides of the head and throat are white and the white wing patches are retained. The neck and chest are buff, gradually paling to white on the belly. Immature birds resemble adults in non-breeding plumage but their throats and the sides of their necks have brown streaking.

== Distribution and habitat ==
The white-tufted grebe is found in the southern and western parts of South America, occurring from lowlands up to an altitude of 4,500 m (14,800 ft) above sea level. Its range includes south-eastern Brazil, Uruguay, Paraguay, Bolivia, Chile, Peru, Argentina and the Falkland Islands. It occurs as a vagrant in the South Sandwich Islands and South Georgia. Its typical habitat is lakes, marshy ponds, ditches and slow-moving rivers and streams. Birds in southernmost South America form into flocks after the breeding season and migrate northwards up the coast. These are often seen in bays and other sheltered marine locations.

== Behaviour ==
=== Breeding ===
The white-tufted grebe varies in breeding behavior depending on the population and it involves elaborate displays. The widespread R. r. chilensis is strongly territorial when breeding and pairs usually are solitary nesters, but they may nest in loose colonies with conspecifics in places with few suitable sites but sufficient food. Both R. r. morrisoni of Lake Junin and R. r. rolland of the Falkland Islands are solitary nesters, never known to form colonies with conspecifics, and pairs of the former may be territorial year-round, whereas pairs of the latter generally appear to be less territorial, even during the breeding season. In both mainland South America and the Falkland Islands, the nest is occasionally placed near nests of other species of waterbirds or colonies of gulls; nesting gulls are pugnacious towards potential predators which also may provide some protection for nesting white-tufted grebes. The nest of the white-tufted grebe consists of a platform made of reeds, other aquatic vegetation or grasses. In the South American mainland, the nest is floating and located some distance from the shore; mating happens on the nest or on another floating platform made of plant material. In the Falkland Islands, the nest is floating but usually directly attached to land or it is placed on firm ground, sometimes even under banks on the shore; mating also commonly happens on firm land (instead of always on a floating platform), which is not known from any other grebe.

This grebe usually lays a clutch of one to three eggs, but occasionally up to six. These eggs usually measure about 40 by 28 millimetres (1.6 by 1.1 in).

=== Feeding ===
The white-tufted grebe feeds mostly on fish, but also takes arthropods and sometimes aquatic vegetation. The fish are typically quite small, but may be up to about 15 cm (6 in) long. The white-tufted grebe catches its prey in rather sluggish dives that may last up to 20 seconds or by only submerging its head while swimming on the surface.

== Status ==
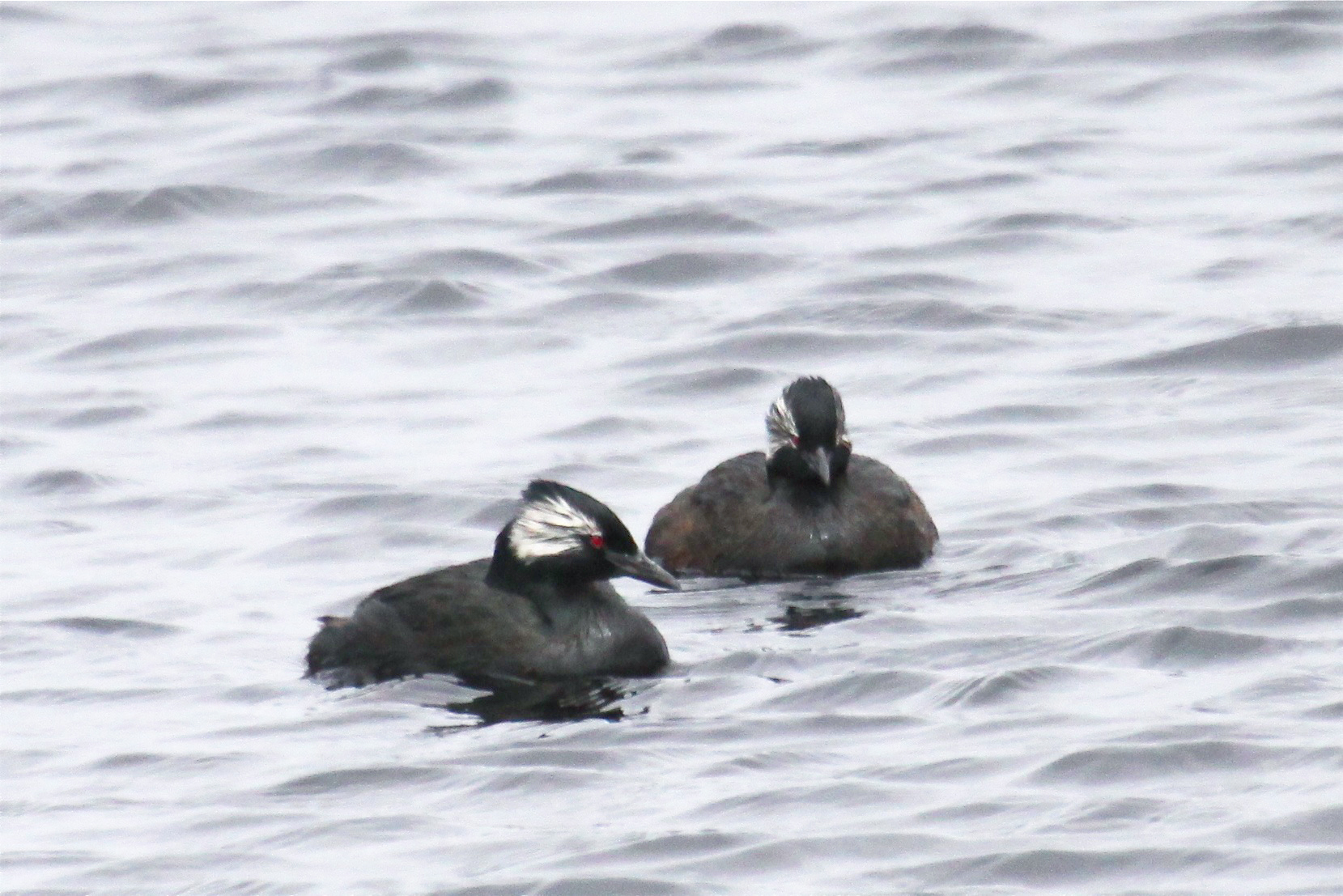
R. r. rolland, the subspecies found only in the Falkland Islands

The white-tufted grebe has an extensive range. The IUCN lists the species as being of "least concern" as it has a stable population trend and the total population is large (68,800 – 70,100 mature individuals as of 2024).

In contrast to the species' overall status, the localized Junin white-tufted grebe (R. r. morrisoni) has a small population that has significantly declined and it is considered threatened, largely for the same reasons as in the Junin grebe (Podiceps taczanowskii). The other subspecies with a small range, the Falkland white-tufted grebe (R. r. rolland), has a population estimated to consist of about 1,000 pairs and this makes it potentially vulnerable, but there is no clear evidence of it having declined in recent times.
