= Ulloma =

Coordinates: 17°30′S 68°30′W

- Town
- Interactive map of Ulloma
- Country: Bolivia
- Time zone: UTC-4 (BOT)

Ulloma is a small town in Bolivia.
