= Jilarata (La Paz) =

Mountain in the Bolivian Andes

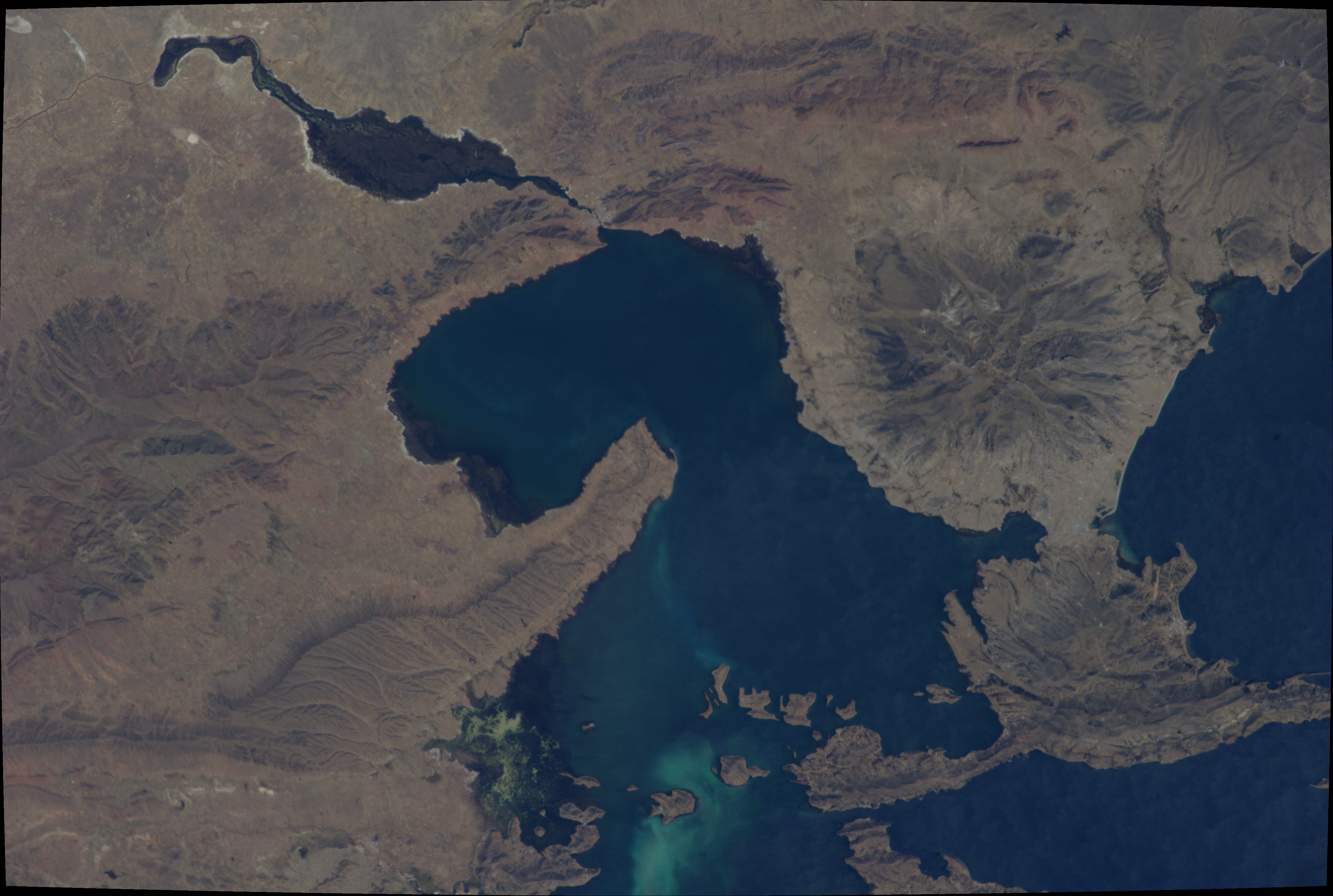
- Jilarata near Wiñaymarka Lake as seen from the ISS (upper center, left; north is to the lower right part of this image)

Highest point
- Elevation: 4,355 m (14,288 ft)
- Coordinates: 16°36′15″S 68°59′40″W

Geography
- Location within Bolivia
- Location: Bolivia; La Paz Department
- Parent range: Andes, Chilla-Kimsa Chata

Jilarata is a 4,355-metre-high (14,288 ft) mountain in the Chilla-Kimsa Chata mountain range in the Andes of Bolivia. It is located in the La Paz Department, Ingavi Province, Desaguadero Municipality. Jilarata lies south of Wiñaymarka Lake, the southern branch of Lake Titicaca, near Desaguadero and the Peruvian border. Janq'u Jaqhi is northeast of it.
