= Katari River =

- Etymology: Aymara

Location
- Country: Bolivia
- Region: La Paz Department

Physical characteristics
- Source
  - location: Aroma Province, Colquencha Municipality
  - coordinates: 17°03′02″S 68°20′02″W
- Mouth: Wiñaymarka Lake
  - location: Los Andes Province, Puerto Pérez Municipality, Aykachi Canton
- Length: 90 km (56 mi)

Basin features
- Tributaries
  - left: Sunimuru Jawira
  - right: Pallina River, Ikiri, Sirk'i Sirk'ini

Katari River (Aymara katari a big viper, "snake river", hispanicized spelling Catari) which upstream successively is named Jach'a Jawira, Colorado, Mani and then Colorado again is a river in the La Paz Department of Bolivia, about 90 km long, southeast of Lake Titicaca. It empties into Wiñaymarka Lake, the southern part of Lake Titicaca.

== Course ==
Known as Jach'a Jawira (Aymara for "big river", also spelled Jachcha Jahuira) it originates from various streams southwest of Qillqatiri at 17°03′02″S 68°20′02″W. At first its direction is to the northwest, then to the north and northeast, and then to the northwest again where it meets Lake Titicaca. The river crosses the municipalities of Colquencha (Aroma Province), Comanche and Coro Coro (Pacajes), Viacha (Ingavi), and Pucarani and Puerto Pérez (Los Andes).

From Qillqatiri near its origin Jach'a Jawira flows along the peaks of Ananta, Waywasi Qullu (Huayhuasi Kkollu) and Chuqi Q'awa which lie on its right side. Near a mountain named Qullqincha (Colquencha) it takes the name Río Colorado (Spanish for "colored river"). It receives waters from an intermittent stream called Sirk'i Sirk'ini (Sirki Sirkini), a right affluent, and it changes its name to Mani.

In Comanche the river turns to the north and gets the name Río Colorado again. Now there is a railroad on the left bank of the river. One of the affluents from the right is Ikiri (Hiquiri). Near the peak of Phuru Qullu (Foro Collu) it receives the name Katari. Shortly before reaching Koniri it gets waters from two streams coming from the west, Katari Jawira ("snake river", also spelled Catari Jahuira) and Sunimuru Jawira (Sunimuro Jahuira).

Near Q'illani (Khellani) the river takes a northwestern direction and soon meets one of its most important tributaries, Pallina River, which upstream is named Jach'a Jawira (Jacha Jahuira), too. Its origin is at 16°48′00″S 68°18′00″W in a plain called Ch'alla Pampa ("sand plain", hispanicized Pampa Challa), near Ch'alla Piñaya (Challapinaya). It surrounds the town of Viacha and runs along Laja before it joins the Katari River.

The confluence of the Katari River with Lake Titicaca is in the bay of Aykachi in the Puerto Pérez Municipality, in the Aykachi Canton.
