= Ch'alla Jawira (Ingavi) =

- Etymology: Aymara

Location
- Country: Bolivia
- Region: La Paz Department, Ingavi Province

Physical characteristics
- Source: Andes
  - location: Tiwanaku Municipality
- Mouth: Tiwanaku River
  - location: Tiwanaku Municipality
  - coordinates: 16°32′52″S 68°41′20″W

The Ch'alla Jawira (Aymara ch'alla sand, jawira river, "sand river", also spelled Challa Jahuira) is a river in the La Paz Department in Bolivia. It is a left tributary of the Tiwanaku River which empties into Wiñaymarka Lake, the southern part of Lake Titicaca.

The Ch'alla Jawira originates from various intermittent streams of the Chilla-Kimsa Chata mountain range northeast, north and northwest of the peak of Kimsa Chata in the Ingavi Province, Tiwanaku Municipality. Its direction is mainly to the north. The confluence with the Tiwanaku River is northwest of the UNESCO World Heritage Site of Tiwanaku at 16°32′52″S 68°41′20″W.
