= Achachi Qala (Ingavi) =

Mountain in Bolivia

- Location within Bolivia

Highest point
- Elevation: 4,600 m (15,100 ft)
- Coordinates: 16°39′09″S 68°48′25″W

Geography
- Location: Bolivia; La Paz Department
- Parent range: Andes, Chilla-Kimsa Chata

Achachi Qala (Aymara for "gigantic stone", also spelled Achachicala) is a mountain in the Chilla-Kimsa Chata mountain range in the Andes of Bolivia which reaches a height of approximately 4,600 m (15,100 ft). It is located in the La Paz Department, Ingavi Province, on the border of the municipalities of Guaqui and Jesús de Machaca. Achachi Qala lies south of Wiñaymarka Lake, the southern branch of Lake Titicaca, northwest of Wanq'uni and southwest of Quta Willk'i.
