= Ch'utu Wankarani =

Mountain in Bolivia

- Location within Bolivia

Highest point
- Elevation: 4,475 m (14,682 ft)
- Coordinates: 16°44′49″S 68°31′49″W

Geography
- Location: Bolivia; La Paz Department
- Parent range: Andes, Chilla-Kimsa Chata

Ch'utu Wankarani (Aymara ch'utu peak of a mountain, top of the head, wankara a kind of drum, ni a suffix to indicate ownership, Hispanicized spelling Choto Huancarani) is a 4,475-metre-high (14,682 ft) mountain in the Chilla-Kimsa Chata mountain range in the Andes of Bolivia. It is located in the La Paz Department, Ingavi Province, Jesús de Machaca Municipality, northeast of Ch'ama (Chama). Ch'utu Wankarani lies northeast of Imill Wawani and Apachita and southeast of Jisk'a Sallalla and Wisk'achani. The Wila Jaqhi Jawira ("red rock river", also spelled Wila Jakke Jahuira, Wila Jaqi Jawira) originates near Ch'utu Wankarani. It flows to the northeast.
