= Awallamaya Lake =

Lake in La Paz Department, Bolivia

Awallamaya
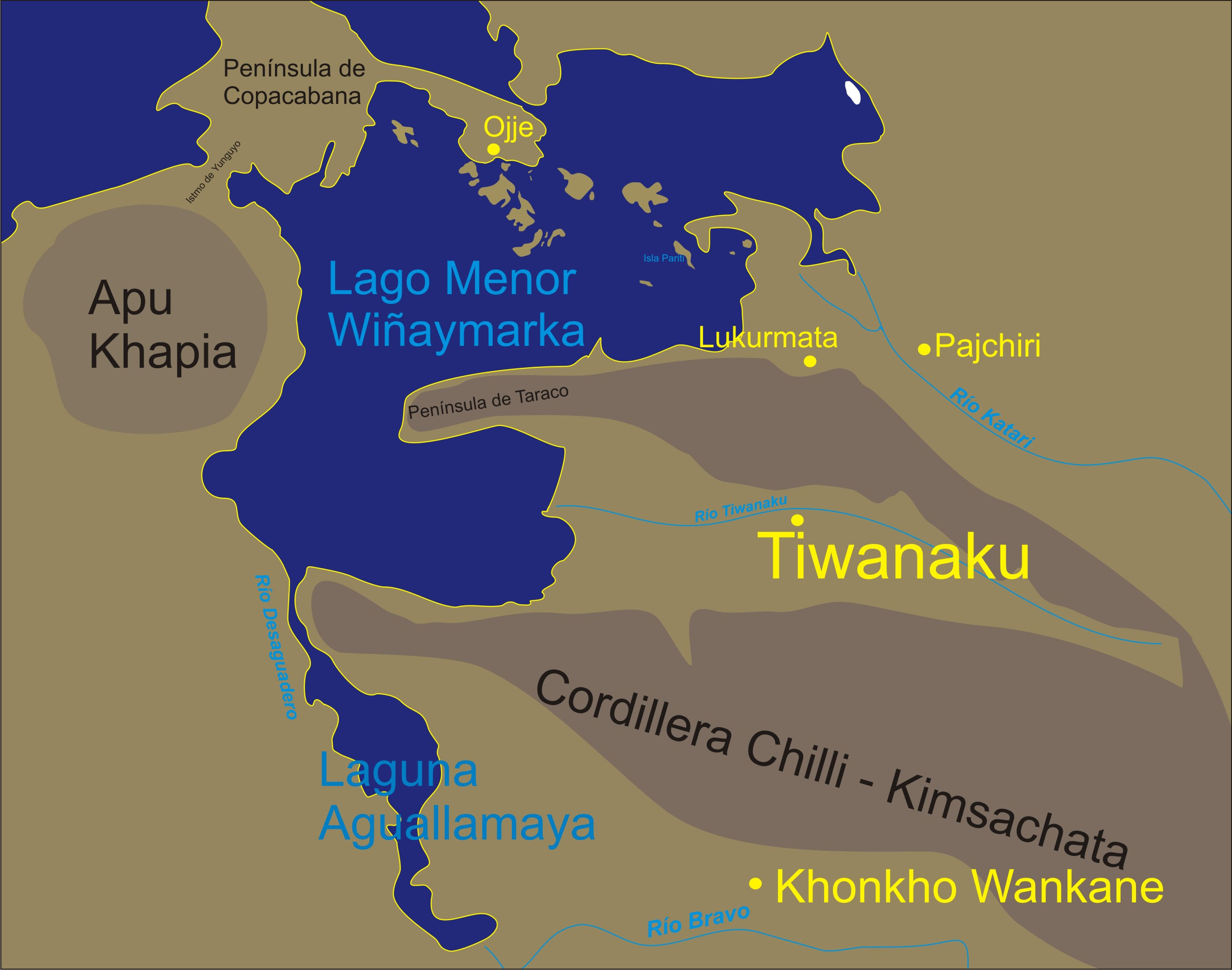
- Sketch map of the area showing the location of Awallamaya Lake

- Location within Bolivia Location within South America
- Interactive map of Awallamaya
- Location: La Paz Department
- Coordinates: 16.685°S 68.975°W
- Primary inflows: Desaguadero
- Primary outflows: Desaguadero
- Basin countries: Bolivia
- Surface area: 96 km^{2} (37 sq mi)
- Islands: none
- Settlements: Desaguadero

Awallamaya (Aymara awalla the first one of two newborn girls, maya one, amaya merlon / dead boy / beloved or very dear son or daughter / lazy / dead / skinny or weak person, Hispanicized spelling Aguallamaya) is a lake in Bolivia located in the La Paz Department, Ingavi Province, Jesús de Machaca Municipality, near the village Awallamaya. Its surface area is 96 km^{2}.

== See also ==
- Chilla-Kimsa Chata mountain range
- Jach'a Jawira
- Thujsa Jawira
- Qhunqhu Wankani
