= Pukara (Jesús de Machaca) =

Mountain in Bolivia

- Location within Bolivia

Highest point
- Elevation: 4,329 m (14,203 ft)
- Coordinates: 16°43′34″S 68°35′21″W

Geography
- Location: Bolivia; La Paz Department, Ingavi Province, Jesús de Machaca Municipality
- Parent range: Andes, Chilla-Kimsa Chata

Pukara (Aymara for fortress, Hispanicized spelling Pucara) is a 4,329-metre-high (14,203 ft) mountain in the Chilla-Kimsa Chata mountain range in the Andes of Bolivia. It lies in the La Paz Department, Ingavi Province, Jesús de Machaca Municipality. Pukara is situated west of the mountain Q'ullq'uni and north-west of the mountains Wisk'achani and Jisk'a Sallalla. The Q'ullq'uni River (Khullkuni) flows along its slopes. It flows to the south as a tributary of Jach'a Jawira.
