= Jach'a Qullu (Ingavi) =

Mountain in Bolivia

- Location within Bolivia

Highest point
- Elevation: 4,305 m (14,124 ft)
- Coordinates: 16°46′27″S 68°38′55″W

Geography
- Location: Bolivia; La Paz Department
- Parent range: Andes, Chilla-Kimsa Chata

Jach'a Qullu (Aymara jach'a big, qullu mountain, "big mountain", also spelled Jachcha Kkollu) is a 4,305-metre-high (14,124 ft) mountain in the Chilla-Kimsa Chata mountain range in the Andes of Bolivia. It is situated in the La Paz Department, Ingavi Province, Jesús de Machaca Municipality. Jach'a Qullu lies near the Jach'a Jawira valley north-east of the archaeological site of Qhunqhu Wankani.
