= Jani Lawani =

Mountain in Bolivia

- Location within Bolivia

Highest point
- Elevation: 4,605 m (15,108 ft)
- Coordinates: 16°40′21″S 68°35′30″W

Geography
- Location: Bolivia; La Paz Department
- Parent range: Andes, Chilla-Kimsa Chata

Jani Lawani (Aymara) is a 4,605-metre-high (15,108 ft) mountain in the Chilla-Kimsa Chata mountain range in the Andes of Bolivia. It is located in the La Paz Department, Ingavi Province, Jesús de Machaca Municipality, and in the Los Andes Province, Laja Municipality. Jani Lawani lies south of Wiñaymarka Lake, the southern branch of Lake Titicaca, northwest of Siqurini, Phujtir Pata Punta and Asir Kunka.
