= Nasa Puqi =

Mountain in Bolivia

- Location within Bolivia

Highest point
- Elevation: 4,735 m (15,535 ft)
- Coordinates: 16°39′04″S 68°40′17″W

Geography
- Location: Bolivia, La Paz Department, Ingavi Province
- Parent range: Andes, Chilla-Kimsa Chata mountain range

Nasa Puqi (Aymara nasa nose, puqi crumb, "nose crumb", also spelled Nasa Poke) is a 4,735-metre-high (15,535 ft) mountain in the Andes in Bolivia. It is located in the Chilla-Kimsa Chata mountain range south-east of Wiñaymarka Lake, the southern part of Lake Titicaca. It lies in the La Paz Department, Ingavi Province, Tiwanaku Municipality. Nasa Puqi is situated north of the mountains Chuqi Ch'iwani and Kimsa Chata.

== See also ==
- Tiwanaku River
