= Chuqi Ch'iwani =

Mountain in Bolivia

- Location within Bolivia

Highest point
- Elevation: 4,695 m (15,404 ft)
- Coordinates: 16°39′58″S 68°40′39″W

Geography
- Location: Bolivia, La Paz Department, Ingavi Province
- Parent range: Andes, Chilla-Kimsa Chata mountain range

Chuqi Ch'iwani (Aymara chuqi gold, ch'iwa edible, cooked leaves, -ni a suffix to indicate ownership, Hispanicized spelling Choque Chihuani) is a 4,695-metre-high (15,404 ft) mountain in the Chilla-Kimsa Chata mountain range in the Andes of Bolivia. It lies south-east of Wiñaymarka Lake, the southern part of Lake Titicaca. It is located in the La Paz Department, Ingavi Province, at the border of the Jesús de Machaca Municipality and the Tiwanaku Municipality. Chuqi Ch'iwani is situated south of the mountains Nasa Puqi and Kimsa Chata.

== See also ==
- Tiwanaku River
