= Pukara (Guaqui) =

Mountain in Bolivia

- Location within Bolivia

Highest point
- Elevation: 4,119 m (13,514 ft)
- Coordinates: 16°36′49″S 68°45′24″W

Geography
- Location: Bolivia; La Paz Department, Ingavi Province, Guaqui Municipality
- Parent range: Andes, Chilla-Kimsa Chata

Pukara (Aymara for fortress, Hispanicized spelling Pucara) is a 4,119-metre-high (13,514 ft) mountain in the Chilla-Kimsa Chata mountain range in the Andes of Bolivia. It is situated in the La Paz Department, Ingavi Province, Guaqui Municipality. The Chilla River flows along its western slope. It is a tributary of Wiñaymarka Lake, the southern branch of Lake Titicaca.
