= Chuqi Q'awa (disambiguation) =

Chuqi Q'awa (Aymara chuqi gold, q'awa little river, ditch, crevice, fissure, gap in the earth, also spelled Choque Khaua, Chuqui Khaua) may refer to:

- Chuqi Q'awa, a mountain in the Jesús de Machaca Municipality, Ingavi Province, La Paz Department, Bolivia
- Chuqi Q'awa (Aroma), a mountain in the Aroma Province, La Paz Department, Bolivia
- Chuqi Q'awa (Chuñuni Jawira), a mountain near Chuñuni Jawira in the Jesús de Machaca Municipality, Ingavi Province, La Paz Department, Bolivia
