= Desaguadero Municipality =

Municipal section in La Paz Department, Bolivia

Coordinates: 16.6167°S 68.9667°W

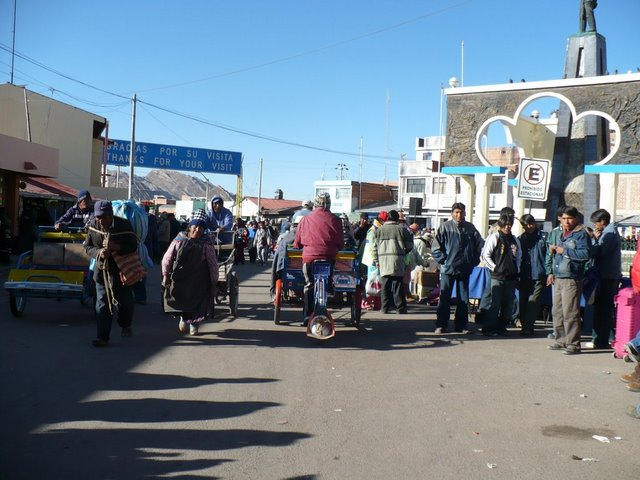
Desaguadero (Peruvian side of the city), at the border Peru - Bolivia

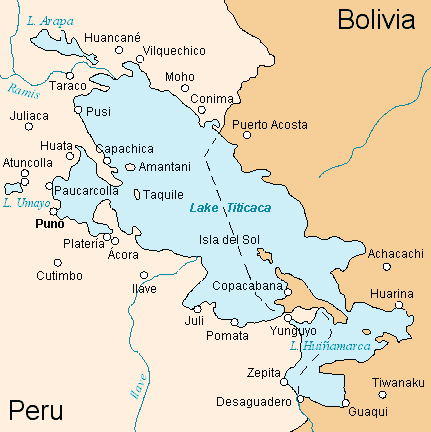
Location of Desaguadero in Bolivia and Peru, at Lake Wiñaymarka (Lake Titicaca)

Desaguadero's municipal flag

Desaguadero Municipality is the fourth municipal section of Ingavi Province in La Paz Department, Bolivia. Its capital is Desaguadero, a town on the border of Peru and Bolivia.

The name Desaguadero refers to the Desaguadero River, a channel of water flowing out from the neighboring Lake Titicaca at this location. This channel forms the international border and separates the Bolivian municipality from the Peruvian district of the same name.

== Communities ==
The municipality consists of the following two cantons:

- Desaguadero - 4.194 inhabitants (2001)
- San Juan de Huancollo - 787 inhabitants

The following communities are located within the municipality:

- Azafranal
- Kealluma
- San Pedro de Desaguadero
- Titijoni
- Vituncani
- Desaguadero
- San Pedro de Okorani
- Chuata
- Taipi Chiviraya
- San Juan de Huancollo
- Yanari
- Jayuma Zapana

== Government ==
The Mayor of Desaguadero is Isidro Henry Mamani Cerda, who was elected in the March 2026 elections.

Desaguadero has a municipal council with five seats, as do all municipalities with populations up to 15,000.

Seat	Type	Name	Party / Political Organization
1	Member	Pedro Sarmiento Cerda	MTS
1	Alternate	Flora Silvia Quispe Millares	MTS
2	Member	Vaneza Sandivel Sánchez Zegarra	MTS
2	Alternate	Víctor Hugo Acarapi	MTS
3	Member	Primitivo Ticona Quispe	M.P.S.
3	Alternate	Sara Aruquipa Salinas	M.P.S.
4	Member	Irma Aruquipa Catari	M.P.S.
4	Alternate	TBD	M.P.S.
5	Member	Erwin Cerda Mamani	M.P.S.
5	Alternate	Mery Dania Cerda Ticona	M.P.S.
Source: Supreme Electoral Tribunal.

== Demographics ==
Population pyramid 2024
%	Males	Age	Females	%
0.4		85+		0.7
0.7		80–84		0.7
0.9		75–79		1.2
1.3		70–74		1.6
1.7		65–69		2.2
2.3		60–64		2.3
2.4		55–59		2.4
3		50–54		3
2.8		45–49		3
3.2		40–44		3.2
3.4		35–39		3.5
3.4		30–34		4
3.6		25–29		3.6
3.4		20–24		3.1
4.1		15–19		3.8
5.1		10–14		4.4
4.8		5–9		4.4
3.2		0–4		3.4
- Source: 2024 Bolivian Census

Population in Recent Censuses
1992	2001	2012	2024
4,337	4,981	6,987	7,897

=== Ethnicity ===
The people are predominantly indigenous citizens of Aymara descent.

Ethnic group	%
Quechua	1.3
Aymara	92.9
Guaraní, Chiquitos, Moxos	0.2
Not indigenous	5.6
Other indigenous groups	0.1

=== Languages ===
The languages spoken in the Desaguadero Municipality are mainly Aymara and Spanish.

Languages spoken
Language	2024 speakers	2024 %	2012 speakers	2012 %
Spanish	6,946	88.0%	5,416	77.5%
Aymara	4,525	57.3%	4,571	65.4%
Quechua	122	1.5%	126	1.8%
Source: 2024 Bolivian Census

== Places of interest ==
Some of the tourist attractions of the municipality are:

- The international fair of Desaguadero on the Peruvian border
- Desaguadero River with its avifauna and native Aymara and Uru communities along its banks. The river runs along the entire Altiplano.

== See also ==
- Janq'u Jaqhi
- Jilarata
