= Ch'alla Qullu =

Ch'alla Qullu may refer to the following mountains:

- Ch'alla Qullu (Bolivia-Chile), on the border of Bolivia and Chile
- Ch'alla Qullu (La Paz), in the La Paz Department, Bolivia
