= Guaqui Municipality =

- Municipality
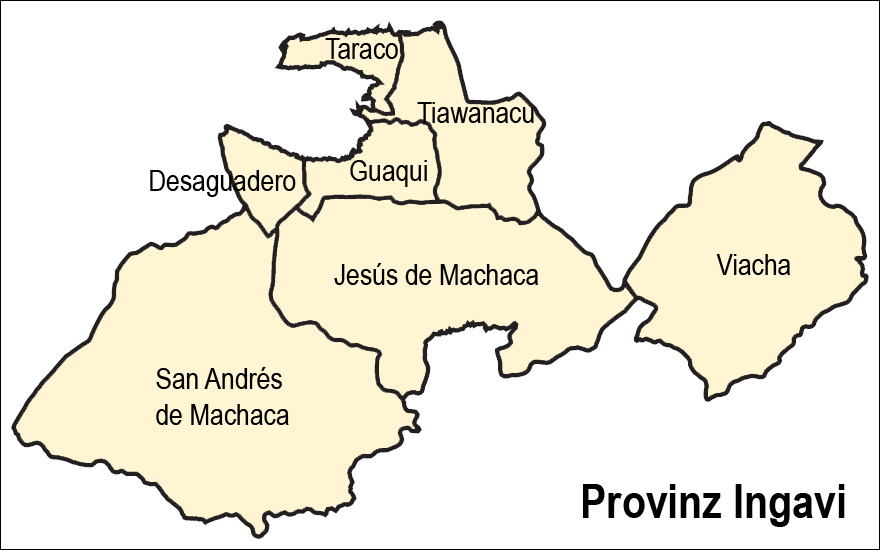
- Location of the municipality within Ingavi province

- Location of the Guaqui Municipality within Bolivia
- Coordinates: 16°37′0″S 68°50′0″W
- Country: Bolivia
- Department: La Paz Department
- Province: Ingavi Province
- Seat: Guaqui

Government
  - Mayor: Nixon Mamani Amaru (2007)
  - President: Abraham Choque Condori (2007)

Area
  - Total: 73 sq mi (188 km^{2})
- Elevation: 12,800 ft (3,900 m)

Population (2001)
  - Total: 7,552
- Time zone: UTC-4 (BOT)

Guaqui Municipality is the second municipal section of the Ingavi Province in the La Paz Department, Bolivia. Its seat is Guaqui.

== Division ==
The municipality consists of only one canton, Guaqui Canton, identical to the municipality.

== The people ==
The people are predominantly indigenous citizens of Aymara descent.

Ethnic group	%
Quechua	1.3
Aymara	91.1
Guaraní, Chiquitos, Moxos	0.3
Not indigenous	7.1
Other indigenous groups	0.1

== Places of interest ==
Some of the tourist attractions of the municipality are:

- Guaqui festivity from July 23 to July 25 celebrated in honour of Apostle James
- Apostle James church of Guaqui built between 1625 and 1784
- Guaqui port

== See also ==
- Achachi Qala
- Jach'a Uma Chuwani
- Pukara
- Qala Waxrani
- Quta Willk'i
- Tiwanaku River
- Wanq'uni
