= Tiwanaku River =

Tiwanaku River / Wakira River
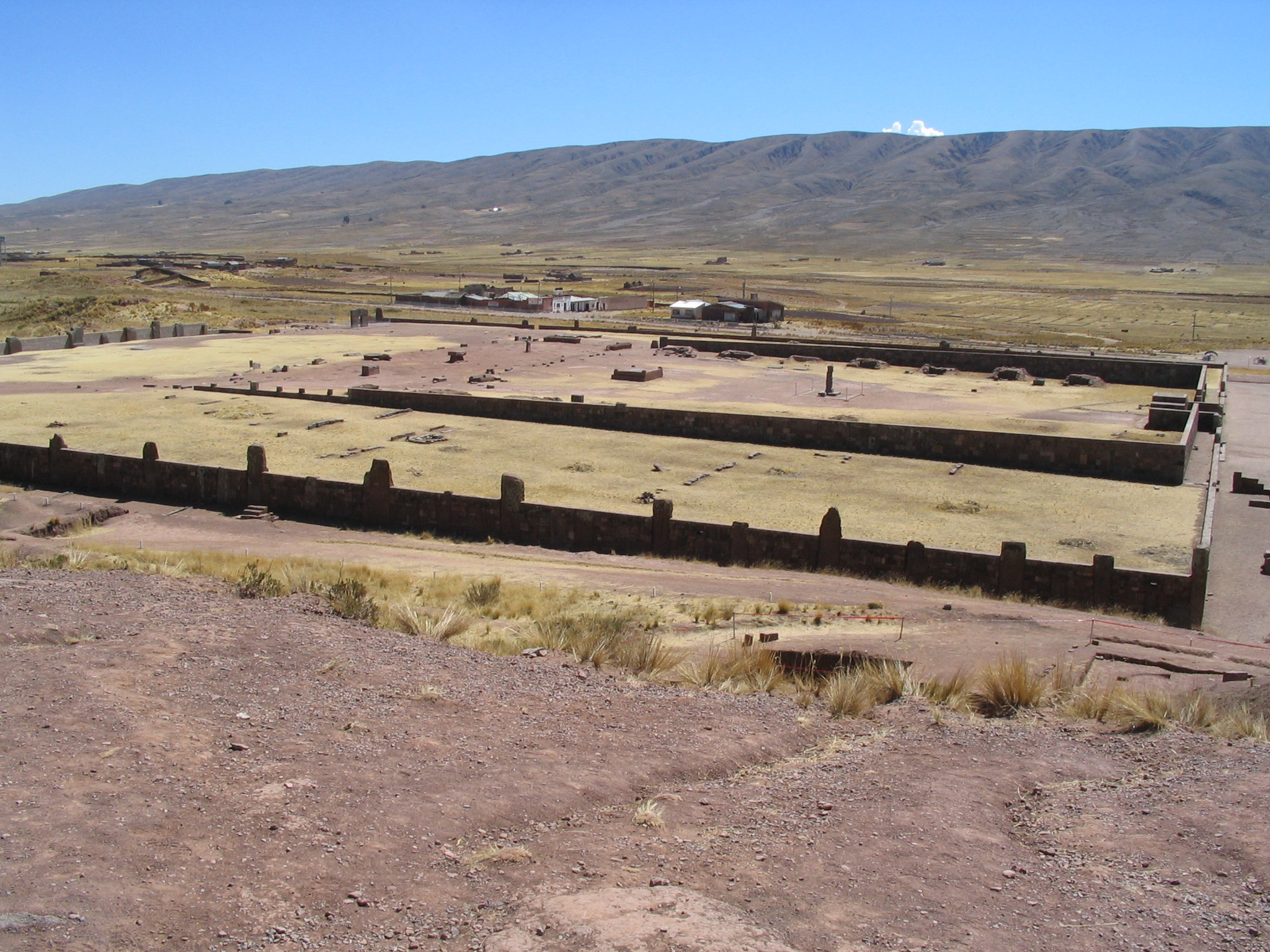
- The Tiwanaku River flows between the archaeological site of Tiwanaku and the village of the same name north west of it (on the left) and the Taraco range (in the background).

Location
- Country: Bolivia
- Region: La Paz Department, Ingavi Province, Los Andes Province

Physical characteristics
- Mouth: Wiñaymarka Lake
  - location: Ingavi Province
  - coordinates: 16°31′20″S 68°50′20″W

Basin features
- Tributaries
  - left: Ch'alla Jawira, Ch'amaka Jawira
  - right: Kunturiri, Allqamari, Jaru Uma

Tiwanaku River (also spelled Tiwanacu) or Wakira River (Aymara, Hispanicized Cuaquira, Guaquira) is a Bolivian river southeast of Lake Titicaca in the La Paz Department, Ingavi Province, in the municipalities of Guaqui and Tiwanaku, and in the Los Andes Province, Laja Municipality. It empties into Wiñaymarka Lake, the southern part of Lake Titicaca, north of Guaqui (Waki) near the villages of Jawira Pampa and Uma Marka. On its way along the southern slopes of the Taraco range it flows along the archaeological site of Tiwanaku.

Some of its left tributaries are Ch'alla Jawira ("sand river") and Ch'amaka Jawira ("dark river"). Kunturiri, Allqamari and Jaru Uma are right affluenets.

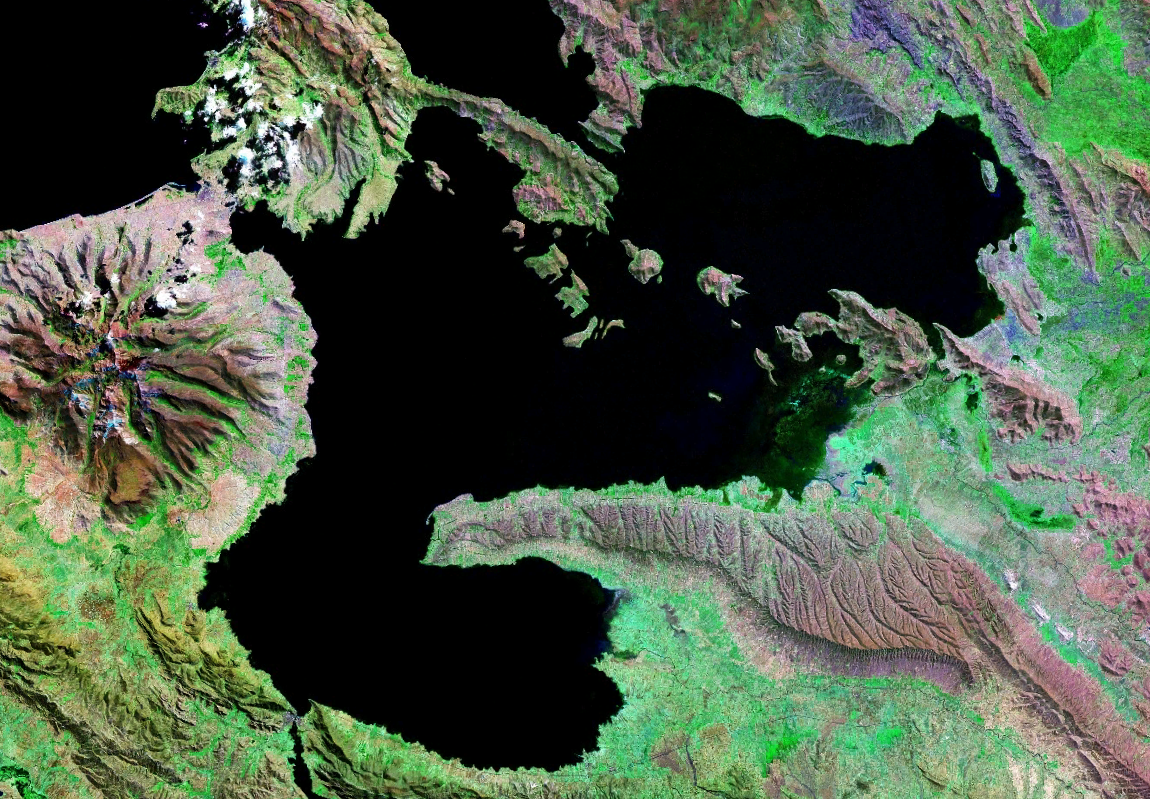
Taraco Peninsula in Wiñaymarka. Tiwanaku River is visible south of the Taraco range. (satellite photo)

== See also ==
- Chilla-Kimsa Chata mountain range
- Katari River
