= Jesús de Machaca =

- Town
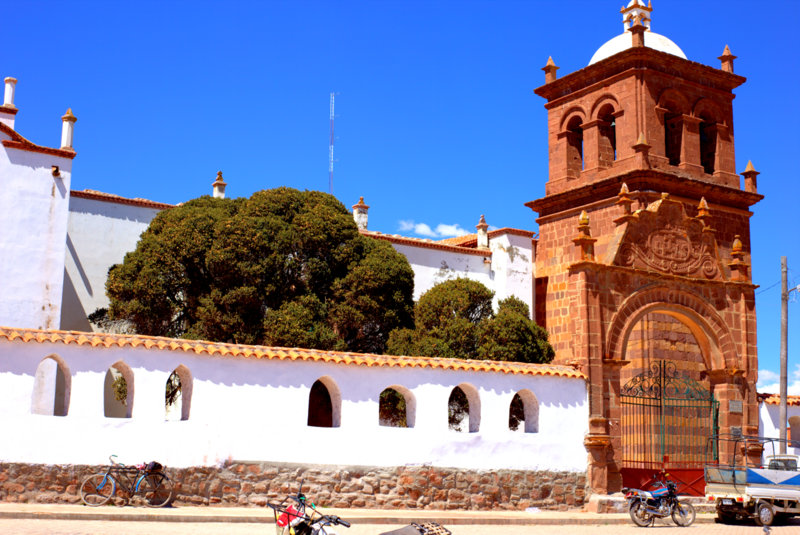

- Location within Bolivia
- Coordinates: 16°45′S 68°50′W
- Country: Bolivia
- Department: La Paz Department
- Province: Ingavi Province
- Municipality: Jesús de Machaca Municipality
- Municipality: Jesús de Machaca Canton

Population (2001)
  - Total: 396
  - Ethnicities: Aymara
- Time zone: UTC-4 (BOT)

Jesús de Machaca is a location in the La Paz Department, Bolivia. It is the seat of the Jesús de Machaca Municipality, the sixth municipal section of the Ingavi Province, and of the Jesús de Machaca Canton. In 2001 it had a population of 396.

== Transport ==
There are daily buses from El Alto to Jesús de Machaca. 'The trip takes about three hours. Part of the road is paved.

- El Alto - Viacha (23 km).
- Viacha - Chama (42 km).
- Chama - Jesús de Machaca (23.5 km).
