= Waqullani (disambiguation) =

Waqullani (Aymara waqulla, pitcher, jug, -ni a suffix to indicate ownership, "the one with a jug", Hispanicized spellings Huacullane, Huacullani) may refer to:

- Waqullani, a mountain in the Arequipa Region in Peru
- Huacullani, a town in the La Paz Department in Bolivia
- Huacullani District, a district in the Puno Region in Peru
