= Jach'a Wankarani =

Mountain in Bolivia

- Location within Bolivia

Highest point
- Elevation: 4,040 m (13,250 ft)
- Coordinates: 16°40′30″S 68°31′13″W

Geography
- Location: Bolivia; La Paz Department
- Parent range: Andes, Chilla-Kimsa Chata

Jach'a Wankarani (Aymara jach'a big, wankara a kind of drum, -ni a suffix to indicate ownership, "the one with a big drum" or "the big one with a drum", also spelled Jachcha Huancarani, Jacha Huancarani) is a mountain in the Chilla-Kimsa Chata mountain range in the Andes of Bolivia, about 4,040 metres (13,255 ft) high. It is located in the La Paz Department, Los Andes Province, Laja Municipality, near Saqaqani (Sacacani). Jach'a Wankarani lies north-east of the mountain Phujtir Pata Punta. It is situated next to the mountain Wankarani (4,009 metres (13,153 ft)).
