= Q'awiri Qullu =

Mountain in Bolivia

- Location within Bolivia

Highest point
- Elevation: 4,000 m (13,000 ft)
- Coordinates: 16°47′11″S 68°28′33″W

Geography
- Location: Bolivia, La Paz Department; Ingavi Province, Los Andes Province
- Parent range: Andes, Chilla-Kimsa Chata

Q'awiri Qullu (Aymara, also spelled Kawiricollo) is a mountain in the Chilla-Kimsa Chata mountain range in the Andes of Bolivia which reaches a height of approximately 4,000 m (13,000 ft). It is located in the La Paz Department, Ingavi Province, on the border of the municipalities of Jesús de Machaca and Viacha, and in the Pacajes Province, Caquiaviri Municipality. Q'awiri Qullu lies southeast of Wayllani.
