= Ch'alla Qullu (La Paz) =

Mountain in Bolivia

- Location within Bolivia

Highest point
- Elevation: 4,660 m (15,290 ft)
- Coordinates: 16°42′37″S 68°43′46″W

Geography
- Location: Bolivia; La Paz Department
- Parent range: Andes, Chilla-Kimsa Chata

Ch'alla Qullu (Aymara ch'alla sand, qullu mountain, "sand mountain", also spelled Challa Kkollu) is a mountain in the Chilla-Kimsa Chata mountain range in the Andes of Bolivia which reaches a height of about 4,660 m (15,290 ft). It is located in the La Paz Department, Ingavi Province, Jesús de Machaca Municipality. Ch'alla Qullu lies northwest of Chhuxlla Willk'i. The Ch'uñu Jawira ("ch'uñu river", Chuñu Jahuira) originates near the mountain. It flows to the south as a right affluent of the Jach'a Jawira.

== See also ==
- Ch'alla Qullu (Bolivia-Chile)
