= Kimsa Chata (Ingavi) =

Mountain in Bolivia

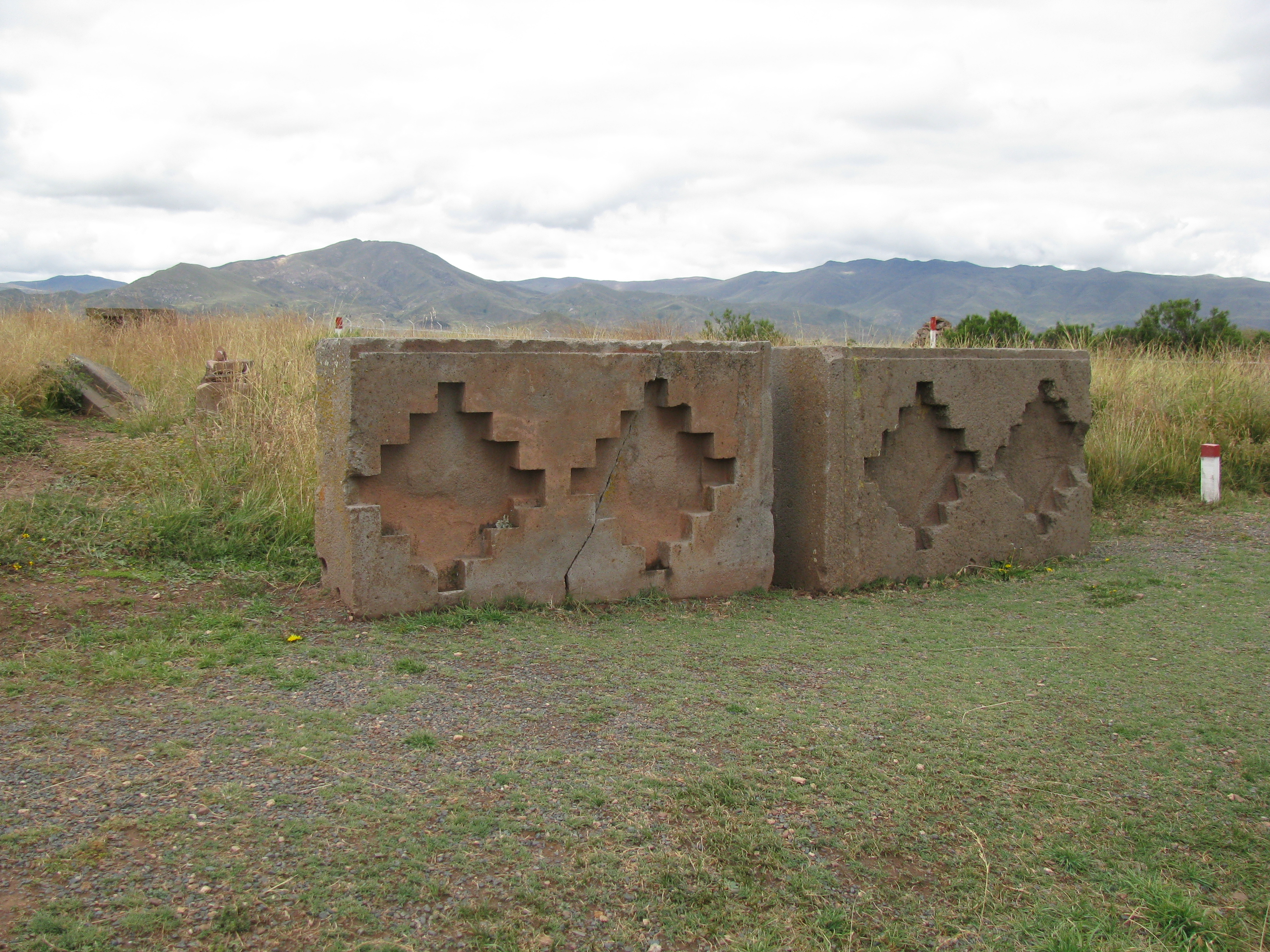
- Chilla-Kimsa Chata mountain range as seen from Tiwanaku (looking south). Kimsa Chata lies behind the mountain Quena Chita on the left.

Highest point
- Elevation: 4,735 m (15,535 ft)
- Coordinates: 16°39′36″S 68°40′21″W

Geography
- Location within Bolivia
- Location: Bolivia, La Paz Department, Ingavi Province
- Parent range: Andes, Chilla-Kimsa Chata mountain range

Kimsa Chata, also spelled Kimsachata, (Aymara and Quechua kimsa three, Pukina chata mountain, "three mountains", spellings Quimsachata, Quimsa Chata) is a 4,735-metre-high (15,535 ft) mountain in the Andes in Bolivia. It is located in the Chilla-Kimsa Chata mountain range south-east of Wiñaymarka Lake, the southern part of Lake Titicaca. It lies in the La Paz Department, Ingavi Province, Tiwanaku Municipality, about 15 km south of the archaeological site of Tiwanaku and the village of the same name. Kimsa Chata is situated between the mountains Nasa Puqi in the north and Chuqi Ch'iwani in the south.

Kimsa Chata is a ceremonial and sacred mountain of the Aymara people. This is also where the Aymara Willkakuti feast takes place.

== See also ==
- Tiwanaku River
