= Qala P'axrani =

Mountain in Bolivia

- Location within Bolivia

Highest point
- Elevation: 4,262 m (13,983 ft)
- Coordinates: 16°39′05″S 68°35′24″W

Geography
- Location: Bolivia; La Paz Department
- Parent range: Andes, Chilla-Kimsa Chata

Qala P'axrani (Aymara qala stone, p'axra bald head, -ni a suffix to indicate ownership, "the one with a stone bald head", also spelled Cala Pajrani) is a 4,262-metre-high (13,983 ft) mountain in the Chilla-Kimsa Chata mountain range in the Andes of Bolivia. It lies in the La Paz Department, Los Andes Province, Laja Municipality. Qala P'axrani is situated south-west of Pukara (Pucara), north-west of the mountain Kunkani. The river Ch'amaka Jawira ("dark river", Chamaca Jahuira) originates near the mountain. It flows to the north as a left tributary of Wakira River.
