= Jach'a Qullu =

Jach'a Qullu (Aymara jach'a big, qullu mountain, "big mountain", also spelled Achacollo, Jacha Khollo, Jacha Khollu, Jacha Kkollu, Jachcha Khollu, Jachcha Kkollu, Jachacollo, Jachaqollo) may refer to:

- Jach'a Qullu (Ingavi), a mountain in the Ingavi Province, La Paz Department, Bolivia
- Jach'a Qullu (Loayza), a mountain in the Malla Municipality, Loayza Province, La Paz Department, Bolivia
- Jach'a Qullu (Los Andes), a mountain in the Los Andes Province, La Paz Department, Bolivia
- Jach'a Qullu (Luribay), a mountain in the Luribay Municipality, Loayza Province, La Paz Department, Bolivia
- Jach'a Qullu (Oruro), a mountain in the Oruro Department, Bolivia
- Jach'a Qullu (Peru), a mountain in the Tacna Region, Peru

== See also ==
- Nemecia Achacollo
