= Wila Qullu (Ingavi) =

Mountain in Bolivia

- Location within Bolivia

Highest point
- Elevation: 4,400 m (14,400 ft)
- Coordinates: 16°40′29″S 68°37′30″W

Geography
- Location: Bolivia, La Paz Department; Ingavi Province
- Parent range: Andes, Chilla-Kimsa Chata

Wila Qullu (Aymara wila blood, blood-red, qullu mountain, "red mountain") is a mountain in the Chilla-Kimsa Chata mountain range in the Andes of Bolivia which reaches a height of approximately 4,400 m (14,400 ft). It is located in the La Paz Department, Ingavi Province, on the border of the municipalities of Jesús de Machaca and Tiwanaku. Wila Qullu lies north of Chuqi Q'awa.
