= Qaluyu =

Mountain in Bolivia

- Location within Bolivia

Highest point
- Elevation: 4,202 m (13,786 ft)
- Coordinates: 16°37′39″S 68°38′02″W

Geography
- Location: Bolivia; La Paz Department
- Parent range: Andes, Chilla-Kimsa Chata

Qaluyu (Aymara qala stone, uyu corral, "stone corral", also spelled Caluyo) is a 4,202-metre-high (13,786 ft) mountain in the Chilla-Kimsa Chata mountain range in the Andes of Bolivia. It is located in the La Paz Department, Ingavi Province, Tiwanaku Municipality. Qaluyu is situated south-west of Pukara (Pucara) and south-east of the archaeological site of Tiwanaku. The village of Qaluyu (Caluyo) lies at its feet.
