= Wayllani (La Paz) =

Mountain in Bolivia

- Location within Bolivia

Highest point
- Elevation: 4,172 m (13,688 ft)
- Coordinates: 16°46′24″S 68°28′42″W

Geography
- Location: Bolivia, La Paz Department; Ingavi Province, Los Andes Province
- Parent range: Andes, Chilla-Kimsa Chata

Wayllani (Aymara waylla Stipa obtusa, a kind of feather grass, -ni a suffix, "the one with the feather grass", also spelled Huayllani) is a 4,172 m (13,688 ft) mountain in the Chilla-Kimsa Chata mountain range in the Andes of Bolivia. It is located in the La Paz Department, Ingavi Province, on the border of the municipalities of Jesús de Machaca and Viacha. It lies southeast of Turini.
