= Q'ilani (Ingavi-Los Andes) =

Mountain in Bolivia

- Location within Bolivia

Highest point
- Elevation: 4,216 m (13,832 ft)
- Coordinates: 16°46′15″S 68°29′40″W

Geography
- Location: Bolivia, La Paz Department
- Parent range: Andes, Chilla-Kimsa Chata

Q'ilani (Aymara q'ila a kind of flower, similar to the lupin, -ni a suffix, "the one with the q'ila plant", also spelled Kelani) is a 4,216 m (13,832 ft) mountain in the Chilla-Kimsa Chata mountain range in the Andes of Bolivia. It is located in the La Paz Department, Ingavi Province, Jesús de Machaca Municipality, and in the Los Andes Province, Laja Municipality. It lies west of Turini. The Ch'iyar Jawira ("black river") originates north of the mountain. It flows to the northeast.
