= Huacullani =

Huacullani Waqullani
- Town
- Location within Bolivia
- Coordinates: 16°26′S 68°44′W
- Country: Bolivia
- Department: La Paz Department
- Province: Ingavi Province
- Municipality: Tiwanaku Municipality

Population (2001)
  - Total: 871
- Time zone: UTC-4 (BST)

Huacullani (in Hispanicized spelling) or Waqullani (Aymara waqulla jug, pitcher, -ni a suffix to indicate ownership, "the one with a jug") is a location in the La Paz Department in Bolivia.
