= Viacha Municipality =

Viacha Wiyacha
- Municipality
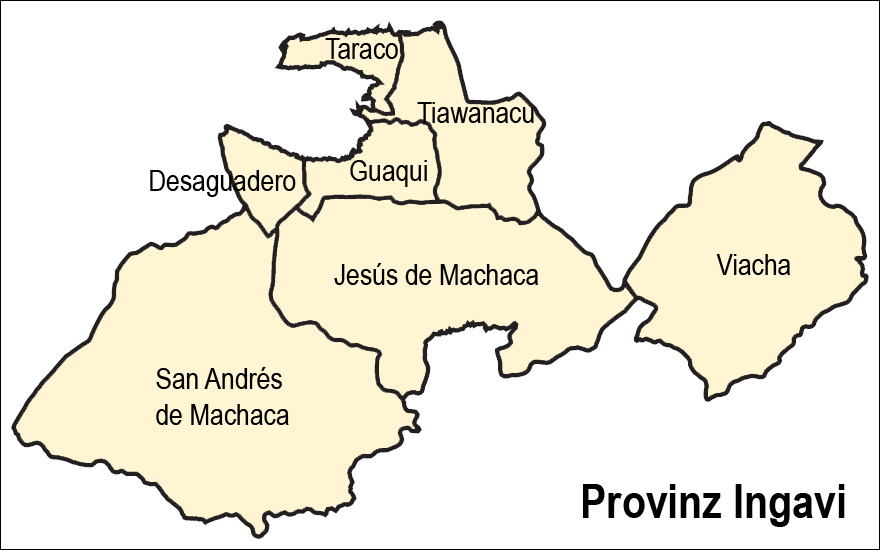
- Location of the municipality within Ingavi province

- Location of the Viacha Municipality within Bolivia
- Coordinates: 16°45′0″S 68°20′0″W
- Country: Bolivia
- Department: La Paz Department
- Province: Ingavi Province
- Seat: Viacha

Government
  - Mayor: Arsenio Lamas Chambi (2007)
  - President: Heriberto Quispe Flores (2007)

Area
  - Total: 326 sq mi (845 km^{2})
- Elevation: 12,800 ft (3,900 m)

Population (2001)
  - Total: 46,596
- Time zone: UTC-4 (BOT)

Viacha Municipality is the first municipal section of the Ingavi Province in the La Paz Department, Bolivia. Its seat is Viacha.

== Division ==
The municipality is subdivided into seven cantons:

- Chacoma Irpa Grande - 1,247 inhabitants (2001)
- General José Ballivian - 452 inhabitants
- Ichuraya Grande - 332 inhabitants
- Irpuma Irpa Grande - 1,078 inhabitants
- Viacha - 46,596 inhabitants
- Villa Remedios - 1,449 inhabitants
- Villa Santiago de Chacoma - 438 inhabitants

== The people ==
The people are predominantly indigenous citizens of Aymara descent.

Ethnic group	%
Quechua	2.9
Aymara	84.4
Guaraní, Chiquitos, Moxos	0.2
Not indigenous	12.2
Other indigenous groups	0.2

== Places of interest ==
Some of the tourist attractions of the municipality are:

- The town of Viacha
- Viriloco lagoon, a small man made lake in Viacha Canton
- Qalachaka bridge in Viacha Canton
- "Virgen de Letanías" Sanctuary in Viacha Canton
- "Pan de Azúcar" mountain in Viacha Canton
- Fields of the Battle of Ingavi in Viacha Canton

== See also ==
- Katari River
- Q'awiri Qullu
- Wayllani
