= Thujsa Jawira =

- Etymology: Aymara

Location
- Country: Bolivia
- Region: La Paz Department, Ingavi Province, Pando Province

Physical characteristics
- Source
  - location: Santiago de Machaca Municipality
- Mouth: Awallamaya Lake
  - coordinates: 16°46′22″S 68°58′23″W

Basin features
- Tributaries
  - left: Ch'alla Jawira, Jach'a Jawira, Taypi Jawira
  - right: Wila Jawira, Chullpa Jawira

Thujsa Jawira (Aymara thujsa smelling, jawira river, "smelling river", also spelled Tujsa Jahuira), which upstream successively is named Ingenio and Río Grande and downstream is called Llink'i, is a river in the La Paz Department in Bolivia. It flows to Awallamaya Lake south of Lake Titicaca.

Thujsa Jawira originates from the confluence of various streams in the Santiago de Machaca Municipality of the José Manuel Pando Province. Known as Ingenio (Spanish for "mill, plant") and Río Grande (Spanish for "big river") it runs to the little town of Santiago de Machaca in the northeast. Behind the town it receives the name Thujsa Jawira. In the San Andrés de Machaca Municipality of the Ingavi Province its direction is mainly to the north until the Jach'a Jawira ("big river", Río Jacha), a left tributary, joins the river. Just before the confluence its name changes to Llink'i ("potter clay", Llinkhi, Llinqui). The river turns to the east and then north again until it empties into Awallamaya Lake.
