= Q'ullq'uni =

Mountain in Bolivia

- Location within Bolivia

Highest point
- Elevation: 4,570 m (14,990 ft)
- Coordinates: 16°43′31″S 68°33′29″W

Geography
- Location: Bolivia; La Paz Department
- Parent range: Andes, Chilla-Kimsa Chata

Q'ullq'uni (Aymara q'ullq'u narrowness, strait, narrow pass, -ni a suffix to indicate ownership, "the one with a strait", also spelled Khullkuni) is a 4,570-metre-high (14,993 ft) mountain in the Chilla-Kimsa Chata mountain range in the Andes of Bolivia. It is situated in the La Paz Department, Ingavi Province, Jesús de Machaca Municipality, north-east of Ch'ama (Chama). Q'ullq'uni lies north-west of the mountain Wisk'achani, north-east of the mountain Jisk'a Sallalla and east of the mountains Pukara and Wila Qullu.
