= Taraco =

Peninsula in Bolivia

Coordinates: 16.45°S 68.8667°W

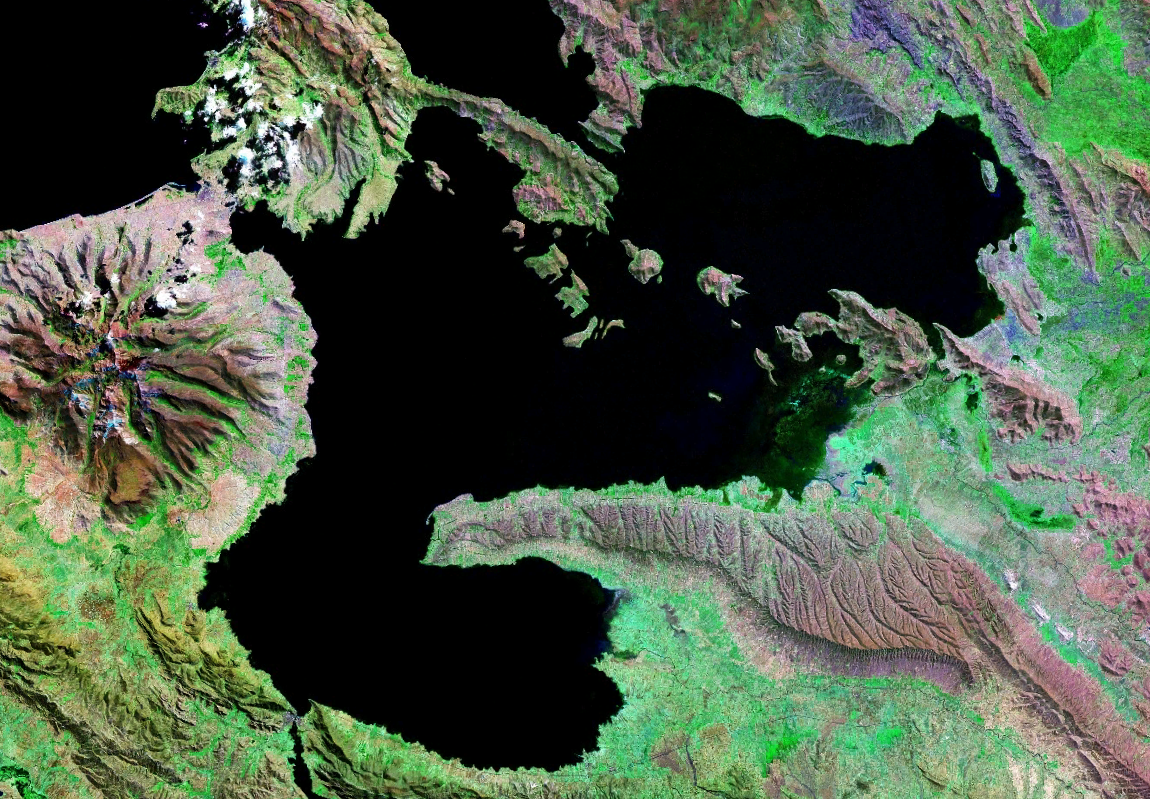
Taraco Peninsula in Lake Wiñaymarka, Lake Titicaca

Taraco is a peninsula jutting into Lake Wiñaymarka, the southern branch of Lake Titicaca in Bolivia. It is located in the La Paz Department, Ingavi Province, Tiwanaku Municipality, Taraco Canton. There is also a town of the same name on the peninsula.

As with many place names in the Titicaca Basin, a corresponding Taraco District also exists on the Peruvian, northern side of the lake in the Huancané Province in Puno.

== See also ==
- Lukurmata
