= Jach'a Uma Chuwani =

Mountain in Bolivia

- Location within Bolivia

Highest point
- Elevation: 4,351 m (14,275 ft)
- Coordinates: 16°39′14″S 68°51′02″W

Geography
- Location: Bolivia; La Paz Department
- Parent range: Andes, Chilla-Kimsa Chata

Jach'a Uma Chuwani (Aymara jach'a big, uma water, chuwa little bowl, -ni a suffix to indicate ownership, "the one with a big water bowl", also spelled Jacha Uma Chuani) is a 4,351-metre-high (14,275 ft) mountain in the Chilla-Kimsa Chata mountain range in the Andes of Bolivia. It is situated in the La Paz Department, Ingavi Province, at the border of the Guaqui Municipality and the Jesús de Machaca Municipality.
