= Quta Willk'i =

Mountain in Bolivia

- Location within Bolivia

Highest point
- Elevation: 4,595 m (15,075 ft)
- Coordinates: 16°38′28″S 68°48′21″W

Geography
- Location: Bolivia; La Paz Department
- Parent range: Andes, Chilla-Kimsa Chata

Quta Willk'i (Aymara quta lake, willk'i gap, "lake gap", also spelled Kkota Willkki) is a 4,595-metre-high (15,075 ft) mountain in the Chilla-Kimsa Chata mountain range in the Andes of Bolivia. It lies in the La Paz Department, Ingavi Province, Guaqui Municipality. Quta Willk'i is situated north-west of the mountain Wanq'uni, north-east of Tanqa Tanqani and south-east of Qala Waxrani.
