= Janq'u Jaqhi (Ingavi) =

Mountain in Bolivia

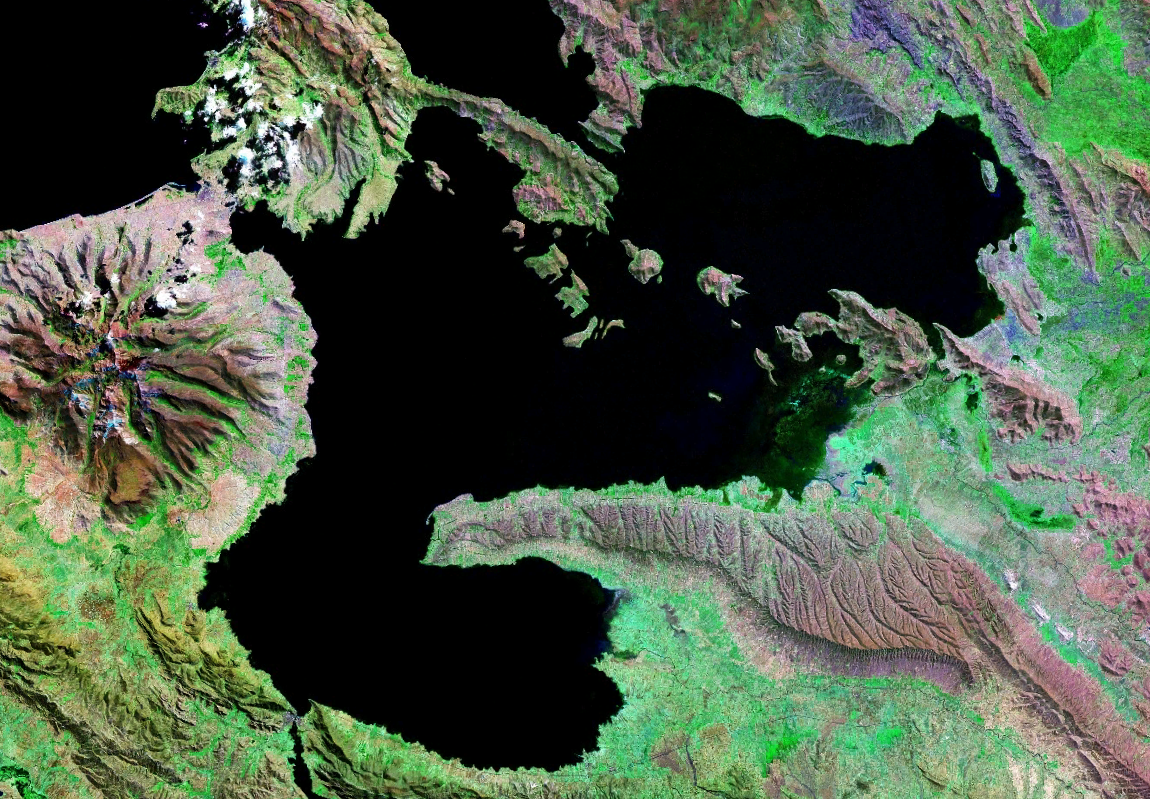
- Wiñaymarka as seen from above with Janq'u Jaqhi south of it (bottom, center-left)

Highest point
- Elevation: 4,254 m (13,957 ft)
- Coordinates: 16°35′54″S 68°58′26″W

Geography
- Location within Bolivia
- Location: Bolivia; La Paz Department
- Parent range: Andes, Chilla-Kimsa Chata

Janq'u Jaqhi (Aymara janq'u white, jaqhi precipice, cliff, "white cliff", also spelled Jankho Jakke) is a 4,254-metre-high (13,957 ft) mountain in the Chilla-Kimsa Chata mountain range in the Andes of Bolivia. It is situated in the La Paz Department, Ingavi Province, Desaguadero Municipality. Janq'u Jaqhi lies south of Wiñaymarka Lake, the southern branch of Lake Titicaca.
