= Laqaya (La Paz) =

Mountain in Chilla-Kimsa Chata mountain range, Andes, Bolivia

- Location within Bolivia

Highest point
- Elevation: 4,825 m (15,830 ft)
- Coordinates: 16°40′07″S 68°43′08″W

Geography
- Location: Bolivia; La Paz Department
- Parent range: Andes, Chilla-Kimsa Chata

Laqaya (Aymara for ruins of a building, also spelled Lakaya) is a 4,825-metre-high (15,830 ft) mountain in the Chilla-Kimsa Chata mountain range in the Andes of Bolivia. It is situated in the La Paz Department, Ingavi Province, at the border of the Jesús de Machaca Municipality and the Tiwanaku Municipality.
