= Jesús de Machaca Municipality =

- Municipality
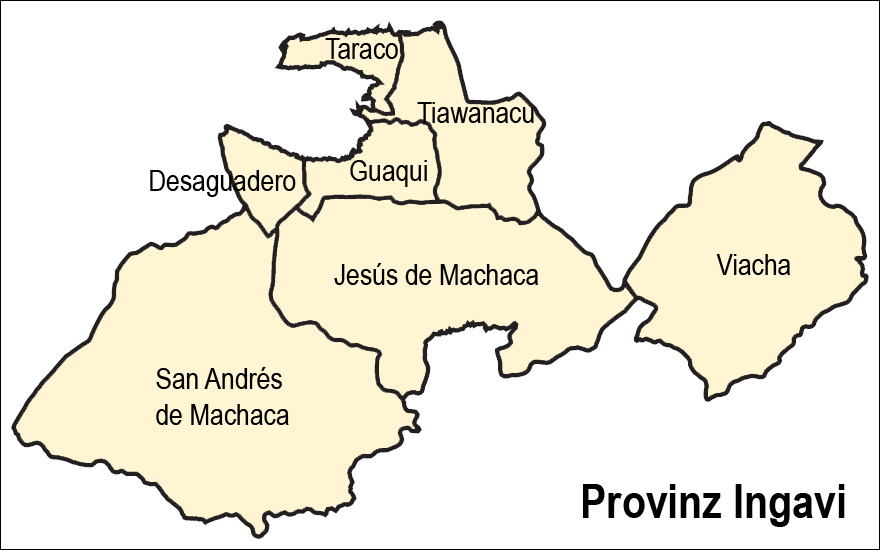
- Location of the municipality within Ingavi province

- Location of the Jesús de Machaca Municipality within Bolivia
- Coordinates: 16°45′0″S 68°45′0″W
- Country: Bolivia
- Department: La Paz Department
- Province: Ingavi Province
- Seat: Jesús de Machaca

Government
  - Mayor: Adrian Aspi Cosme (2008)
  - President: Melicio Llanqui Mita (2008)

Area
  - Total: 369 sq mi (955 km^{2})

Population (2001)
  - Total: 13,247
- Time zone: UTC-4 (BOT)

Jesús de Machaca Municipality is the sixth municipal section of the Ingavi Province in the La Paz Department in Bolivia. It was created by Law No. 2351 on May 7, 2002, during the presidency of Jorge Quiroga Ramírez. Its seat is Jesús de Machaca.

== Geography ==
Jesús de Machaca lies south of Lake Titicaca. The Chilla-Kimsa Chata mountain range traverses the municipality. Some of the highest mountains of the municipality are listed below:

- Achachi Qala
- Apachita
- Asir Kunka
- Chuqi Ch'iwani
- Chuqi Q'awa
- Chuqi Q'awa (Chuñuni Jawira)
- Chhuxlla Willk'i
- Ch'alla Qullu
- Ch'utu Wankarani
- Imill Wawani
- Jach'a Uma Chuwani
- Jani Lawani
- Jisk'a Sallalla
- Laqaya
- Pukara
- Phujtir Pata Punta
- Q'awiri Qullu
- Q'ilani
- Q'ullq'uni
- Turini
- T'aqachiri
- Wayllani
- Wanq'uni
- Wila Qullu
- Wisk'achani

== Division ==
The municipality consists of the following ten cantons:

- Aguallamaya - 1,694 inhabitants (2001)
- Chama - 1,278 inhabitants
- Cuipa España de Machaca - 662 inhabitants
- Jesús de Machaca - 862 inhabitants
- Kalla Tupac Katari - 2,669 inhabitants
- Khonkho San Salvador - 755 inhabitants
- Mejillones de Machaca - 845 inhabitants
- Santa Ana de Machaca - 363 inhabitants
- Santo Domingo de Machaca - 588 inhabitants
- Villa Asunción de Machaca - 3,244 inhabitants

== The people ==
The people are predominantly indigenous citizens of Aymara descent.

Ethnic group	%
Quechua	0.3
Aymara	94.4
Guaraní, Chiquitos, Moxos	0.1
Not indigenous	4.3
Other indigenous groups	0.9

== Places of interest ==
Some of the tourist attractions of the municipality are:

- The archaeological site of Qhunqhu Wankani in Jesús de Machaca Canton
- Jesús de Machaca, an indigenous community
- Yakayuni saltflats in Jesús de Machaca Canton where salt exploitation is possible
- Uru Iruito community in Jesús de Machaca Canton and the Urus Iruito museum in Jesús de Machaca

== See also ==
- Awallamaya Lake
- Jach'a Jawira
