= Apachita (Ingavi) =

Mountain in Bolivia

- Location within Bolivia

Highest point
- Elevation: 4,556 m (14,948 ft)
- Coordinates: 16°45′47″S 68°32′10″W

Geography
- Location: Bolivia; La Paz Department
- Parent range: Andes, Chilla-Kimsa Chata

Apachita (Aymara for the place of transit of an important pass in the principal routes of the Andes; name for a stone cairn in the Andes, a little pile of rocks built along the trail in the high mountains, Hispanicized spelling Apacheta) is a 4,556-metre-high (14,948 ft) mountain in the Chilla-Kimsa Chata mountain range in the Andes of Bolivia. It lies in the La Paz Department, Ingavi Province, Jesús de Machaca Municipality, north-east of Ch'ama (Chama). Apachita is situated south-west of the mountain Ch'utu Wankarani and north-east of the mountain Imill Wawani.
