= Chuqi Q'awa (Chuñuni Jawira) =

Mountain in Bolivia

- Location within Bolivia

Highest point
- Elevation: 4,570 m (14,990 ft)
- Coordinates: 16°41′13″S 68°37′19″W

Geography
- Location: Bolivia; La Paz Department
- Parent range: Andes, Chilla-Kimsa Chata

Chuqi Q'awa (Aymara chuqi gold, q'awa little river, ditch, crevice, fissure, gap in the earth, "gold brook" or "gold ravine", Hispanicized spelling Choque Khaua) is a 4,570-metre-high (14,993 ft) mountain in the Chilla-Kimsa Chata mountain range in the Andes of Bolivia. It lies in the La Paz Department, Ingavi Province, in the north of the Jesús de Machaca Municipality, near the border with the Tiwanaku Municipality. Chuqi Q'awa is situated south of the river Chuñuni Jawira (Chununi Jahuira).

Chuqi Q'awa is also the name of the river which originates south of the mountain. Its waters flows to Jach'a Jawira in the south.
