= T'aqachiri =

Mountain in Bolivia

- Location within Bolivia

Highest point
- Elevation: 4,100 m (13,500 ft)
- Coordinates: 16°49′51″S 68°30′24″W

Geography
- Location: Bolivia, La Paz Department; Ingavi Province, Los Andes Province
- Parent range: Andes, Chilla-Kimsa Chata

T'aqachiri (Aymara, also spelled Tacachiri) is a mountain in the Chilla-Kimsa Chata mountain range in the Andes of Bolivia which reaches a height of approximately 4,100 m (13,500 ft). It is located in the La Paz Department, Ingavi Province, Jesús de Machaca Municipality.
