= Chuqi Q'awa =

Mountain in Bolivia

- Location within Bolivia

Highest point
- Elevation: 4,790 m (15,720 ft)
- Coordinates: 16°43′24″S 68°38′19″W

Geography
- Location: Bolivia; La Paz Department
- Parent range: Andes, Chilla-Kimsa Chata

Chuqi Q'awa (Aymara chuqi gold, q'awa little river, ditch, crevice, fissure, gap in the earth, "gold brook" or "gold ravine", Hispanicized spelling Choque Khaua) is a 4,790-metre-high (15,715 ft) mountain in the Chilla-Kimsa Chata mountain range in the Andes of Bolivia. It lies in the La Paz Department, Ingavi Province, Jesús de Machaca Municipality. Chuqi Q'awa is situated west of the mountain Pukara.

Chuqi Q'awa is also the name of the river east of the mountain. Its waters flows to Jach'a Jawira in the south.
