= Asir Kunka =

Mountain in Bolivia

- Location within Bolivia

Highest point
- Elevation: 4,641 m (15,226 ft)
- Coordinates: 16°41′00″S 68°34′54″W

Geography
- Location: Bolivia; La Paz Department
- Parent range: Andes, Chilla-Kimsa Chata

Asir Kunka or Asiru Kunka (Aymara asiru snake, kunka throat, "snake throat", also spelled Acerkunka) is a 4,641-metre-high (15,226 ft) mountain in the Chilla-Kimsa Chata mountain range in the Andes of Bolivia. It lies in the La Paz Department, at the border of the Ingavi Province, Jesús de Machaca Municipality, and the Los Andes Province, Laja Municipality. Asir Kunka is situated northwest of Phujtir Pata Punta.
