= Laja Municipality =

Coordinates: 16.5833°S 68.4167°W

- Municipality
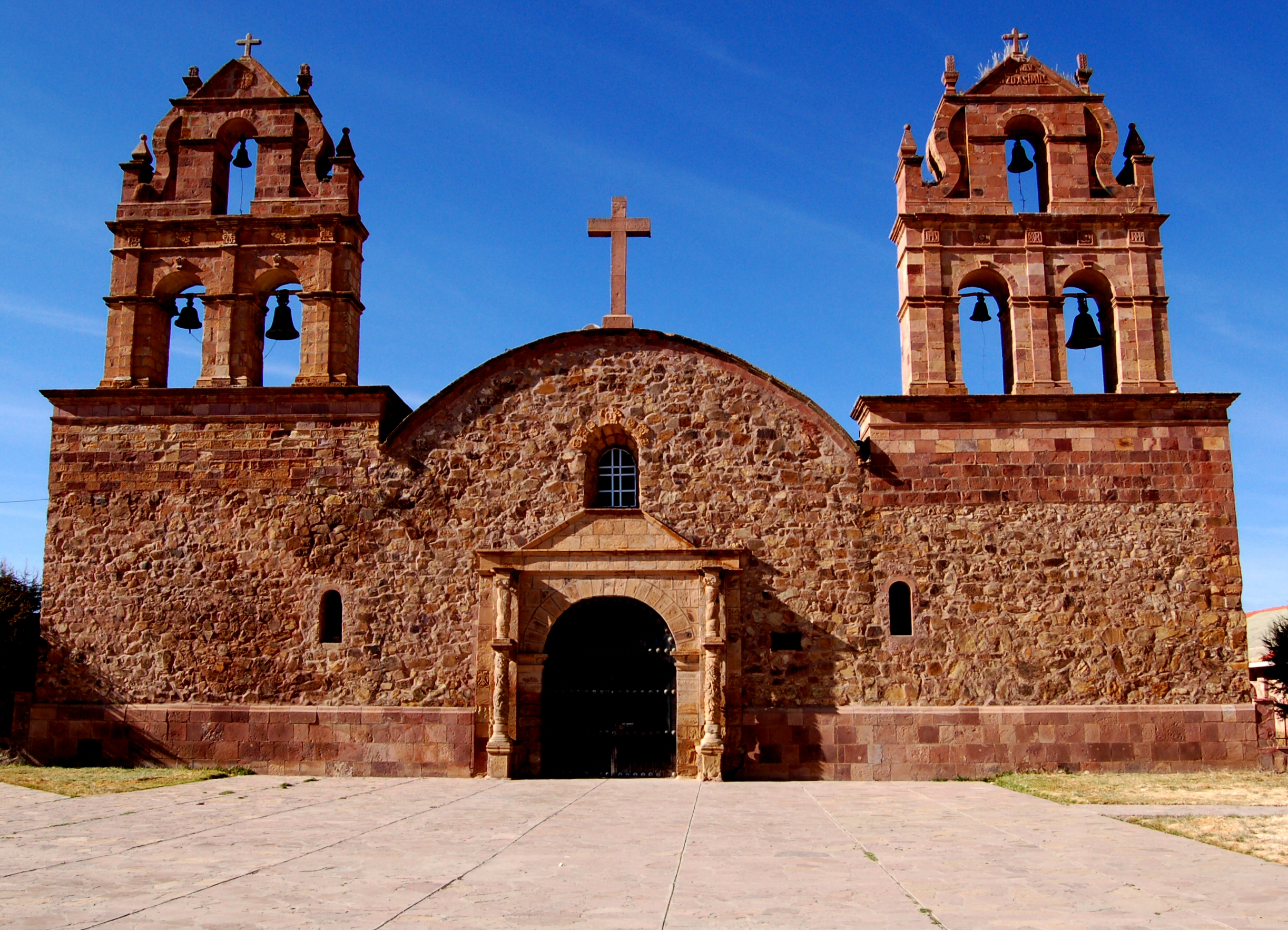
- Church in Laja
- Interactive map of Laja Municipality
- Country: Bolivia
- Department: La Paz Department
- Province: Los Andes Province
- Seat: Laja

Population (2001)
  - Total: 16,311
- Time zone: UTC-4 (BOT)

Laja Municipality is the second municipal section of the Los Andes Province in the La Paz Department, Bolivia. Its seat is Laja.

== See also ==
- Asir Kunka
- Jach'a Wankarani
- Jani Lawani
- Phujtir Pata Punta
- Qala P'axrani
- Q'ilani
- Turini
