= Imill Wawani =

Mountain in Bolivia

- Location within Bolivia

Highest point
- Elevation: 4,505 m (14,780 ft)
- Coordinates: 16°45′55″S 68°32′57″W

Geography
- Location: Bolivia; La Paz Department
- Parent range: Andes, Chilla-Kimsa Chata

Imill Wawani (Aymara mimilla, imilla, mimilla wawa girl, ni a suffix to indicate ownership, "the one with a girl", Hispanicized spelling Imillhuahuani) is a 4,505-metre-high (14,780 ft) mountain in the Chilla-Kimsa Chata mountain range in the Andes of Bolivia. It is situated in the La Paz Department, Ingavi Province, Jesús de Machaca Municipality, north-east of Ch'ama (Chama). Imill Wawani lies south-west of the mountain Apachita and south-east of the mountain Jisk'a Sallalla.
