= San Andrés de Machaca =

- Town
- Location in Bolivia
- Coordinates: 16°57′22″S 68°58′07″W
- Country: Bolivia
- Department: La Paz Department
- Time zone: UTC-4 (BOT)

San Andrés de Machaca is a town in the La Paz Department, Bolivia.
