= Laja, Bolivia =

Laja
- Town
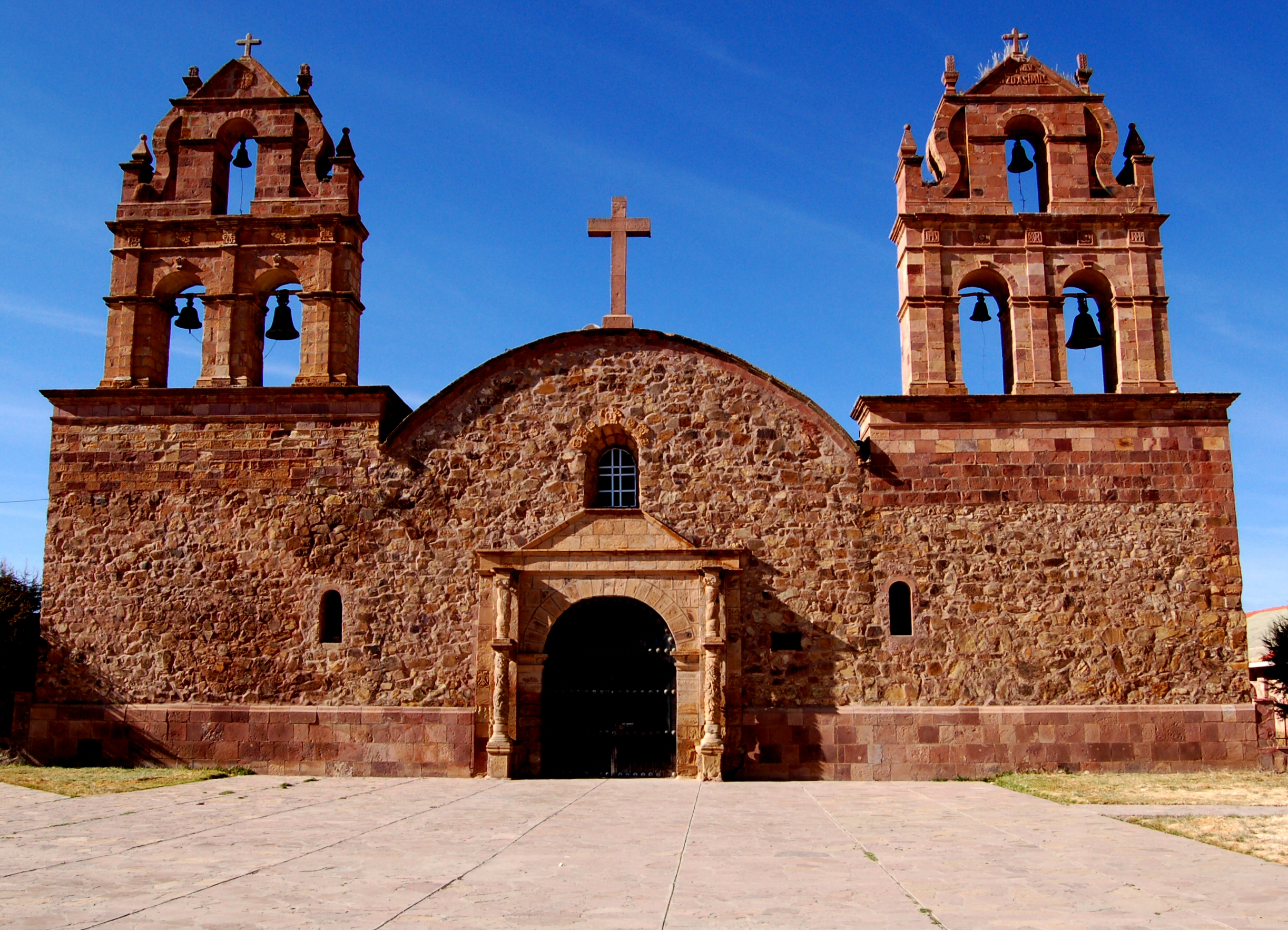
- Church of Laja, said to be made of stones from Tiwanaku

- Location within Bolivia
- Coordinates: 16°32′S 68°23′W
- Country: Bolivia
- Department: La Paz Department
- Province: Los Andes Province
- Municipality: Laja Municipality
- Elevation: 12,800 ft (3,900 m)

Population (2001)
  - Total: 707
- Time zone: UTC-4 (BOT)

Laja is a town 25 kilometres (16 mi) west of La Paz, in the La Paz Department of Bolivia. It is the administrative seat of the Laja Municipality, the second municipal section of the Los Andes Province.
