= Qhunqhu Wankani =

Archaeological site in Bolivia

Coordinates: 16.80797°S 68.6726°W

- Interactive map of Qhunqhu Wankani
- Location: Qhunqhu Liqiliqi, Ingavi Province, La Paz Department, Bolivia
- Region: Andes

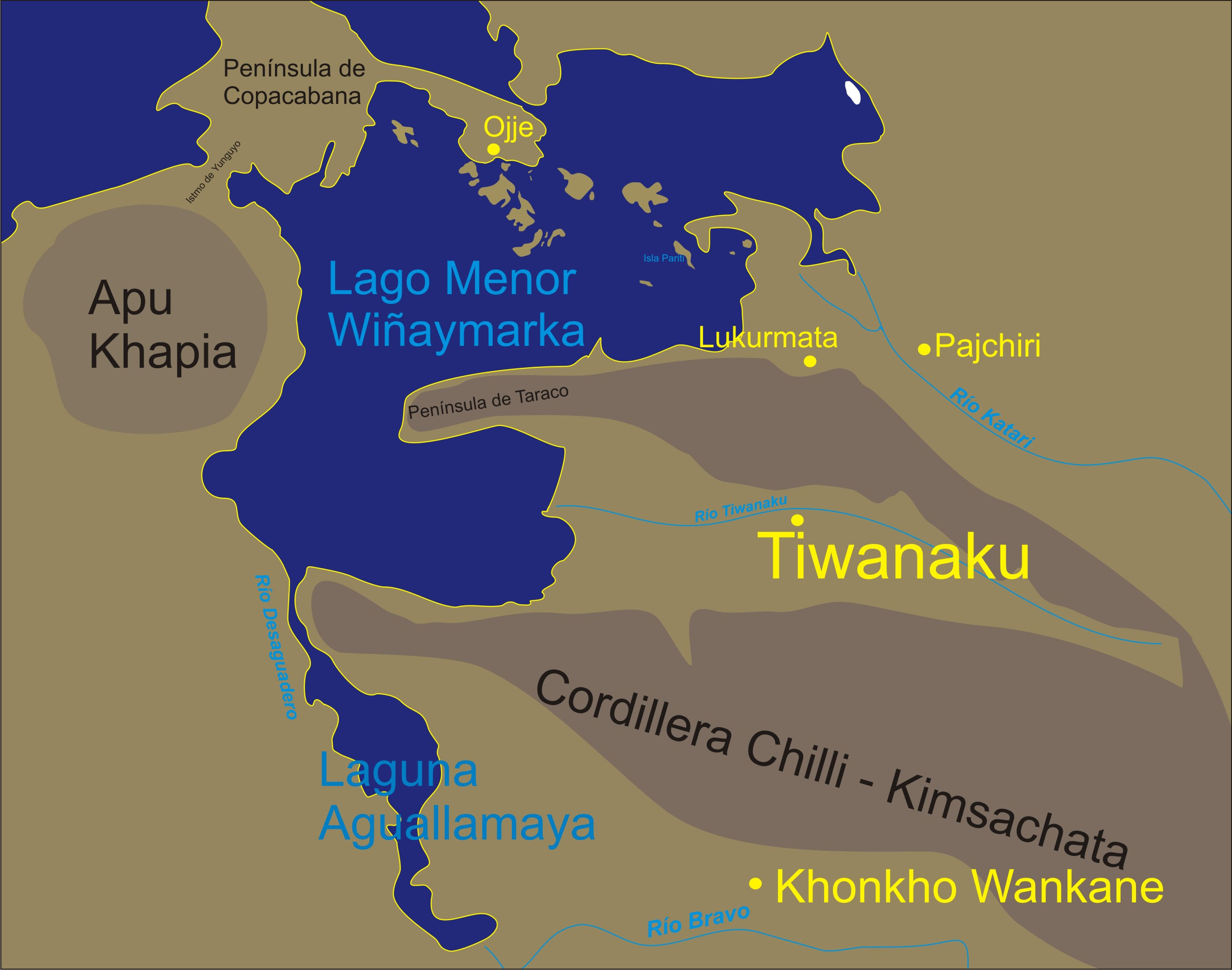
Location of Qhunqhu Wankani

Qhunqhu Wankani (Aymara, Hispanicized spellings Khonkho Wankane, Khonkho Wankani, Khonko Huancane, Qhunqhu Wankane) is an archaeological site in Bolivia located in the La Paz Department, Ingavi Province, Jesús de Machaca Municipality. It is situated south of Lake Wiñaymarka, the southern part of Lake Titicaca, and south of the ancient building site of Tiwanaku, near the village Qhunqhu Liqiliqi.
