= Wanq'uni (Bolivia) =

Mountain in Bolivia

- Location within Bolivia

Highest point
- Elevation: 4,599 m (15,089 ft)
- Coordinates: 16°39′17″S 68°47′35″W

Geography
- Location: Bolivia; La Paz Department
- Parent range: Andes, Chilla-Kimsa Chata

Wanq'uni (Aymara wanq'u guinea pig, -ni a suffix to indicate ownership, "the one with guinea pigs", also spelled Huankhuni) is a 4,599-metre-high (15,089 ft) mountain in the Chilla-Kimsa Chata mountain range in the Andes of Bolivia. It lies in the La Paz Department, Ingavi Province, at the border of the Guaqui Municipality and the Jesús de Machaca Municipality. Wanq'uni is situated northeast of Tanka Tankani and southeast of Quta Willk'i.
