= Qala Waxrani =

Mountain in Bolivia

- Location within Bolivia

Highest point
- Elevation: 4,316 m (14,160 ft)
- Coordinates: 16°37′28″S 68°49′41″W

Geography
- Location: Bolivia; La Paz Department
- Parent range: Andes, Chilla-Kimsa Chata

Qala Waxrani (Aymara qala stone, waxra horn, -ni a suffix to indicate ownership, "the one with a stone horn", also spelled Khalawajrani) is a 4,316-metre-high (14,160 ft) mountain in the Chilla-Kimsa Chata mountain range in the Andes of Bolivia. It is situated in the La Paz Department, Ingavi Province, Guaqui Municipality, south-east of Guaqui.
