= Wisk'achani (Ingavi) =

Mountain in Bolivia

- Location within Bolivia

Highest point
- Elevation: 4,585 m (15,043 ft)
- Coordinates: 16°43′52″S 68°32′59″W

Geography
- Location: Bolivia; La Paz Department
- Parent range: Andes, Chilla-Kimsa Chata

Wisk'achani (Aymara wisk'acha a rodent, -ni a suffix to indicate ownership, "the one with the viscacha", Hispanicized spelling Viscachani) is a 4,585-metre-high (15,043 ft) mountain in the Chilla-Kimsa Chata mountain range in the Andes of Bolivia. It is situated in the La Paz Department, Ingavi Province, Jesús de Machaca Municipality, north-east of Ch'ama (Chama). Wisk'achani lies north of the mountain Imill Wawani, north-east of Jisk'a Sallalla and Sallalla and south-east of Q'ullq'uni. The river Wila Jaqhi Jahuira ("red rock river", Wila Jakke Jahuira) originates east of the mountain. It flows to the north-east.
