= Turini (Ingavi) =

Mountain in Bolivia

- Location within Bolivia

Highest point
- Elevation: 4,212 m (13,819 ft)
- Coordinates: 16°46′11″S 68°28′58″W

Geography
- Location: Bolivia, La Paz Department; Ingavi Province, Los Andes Province
- Parent range: Andes, Chilla-Kimsa Chata

Turini (Aymara turi tower, -ni a suffix, "the one with a tower", also spelled Torrini) is a 4,212 m (13,819 ft) mountain in the Chilla-Kimsa Chata mountain range in the Andes of Bolivia. It is located in the La Paz Department, Ingavi Province, Jesús de Machaca Municipality, and in the Los Andes Province, Laja Municipality. It lies near Q'ilani.
