= Chhuxlla Willk'i =

Mountain in Bolivia

- Location within Bolivia

Highest point
- Elevation: 4,664 m (15,302 ft)
- Coordinates: 16°43′08″S 68°42′08″W

Geography
- Location: Bolivia; La Paz Department
- Parent range: Andes, Chilla-Kimsa Chata

Chhuxlla Willk'i (Aymara chhuxlla grass, weed, pasture or a kind of barley, willk'i gap, "pasture gap" or "barley gap", also spelled Chojlla Willkhi) is a 4,664-metre-high (15,302 ft) mountain in the Chilla-Kimsa Chata mountain range in the Andes of Bolivia. It lies in the La Paz Department, Ingavi Province, Jesús de Machaca Municipality. Chhuxlla Willk'i is situated south-east of the 4,737-metre-high (15,541 ft) mountain named Qala Cruz (Khala Cruz) and Ch'alla Qullu ("sand mountain", Challa Kkollu), and north-east of a 4,522-metre-high (14,836 ft) mountain which is also called Qala Cruz.
