= Ingavi Province =

- Province
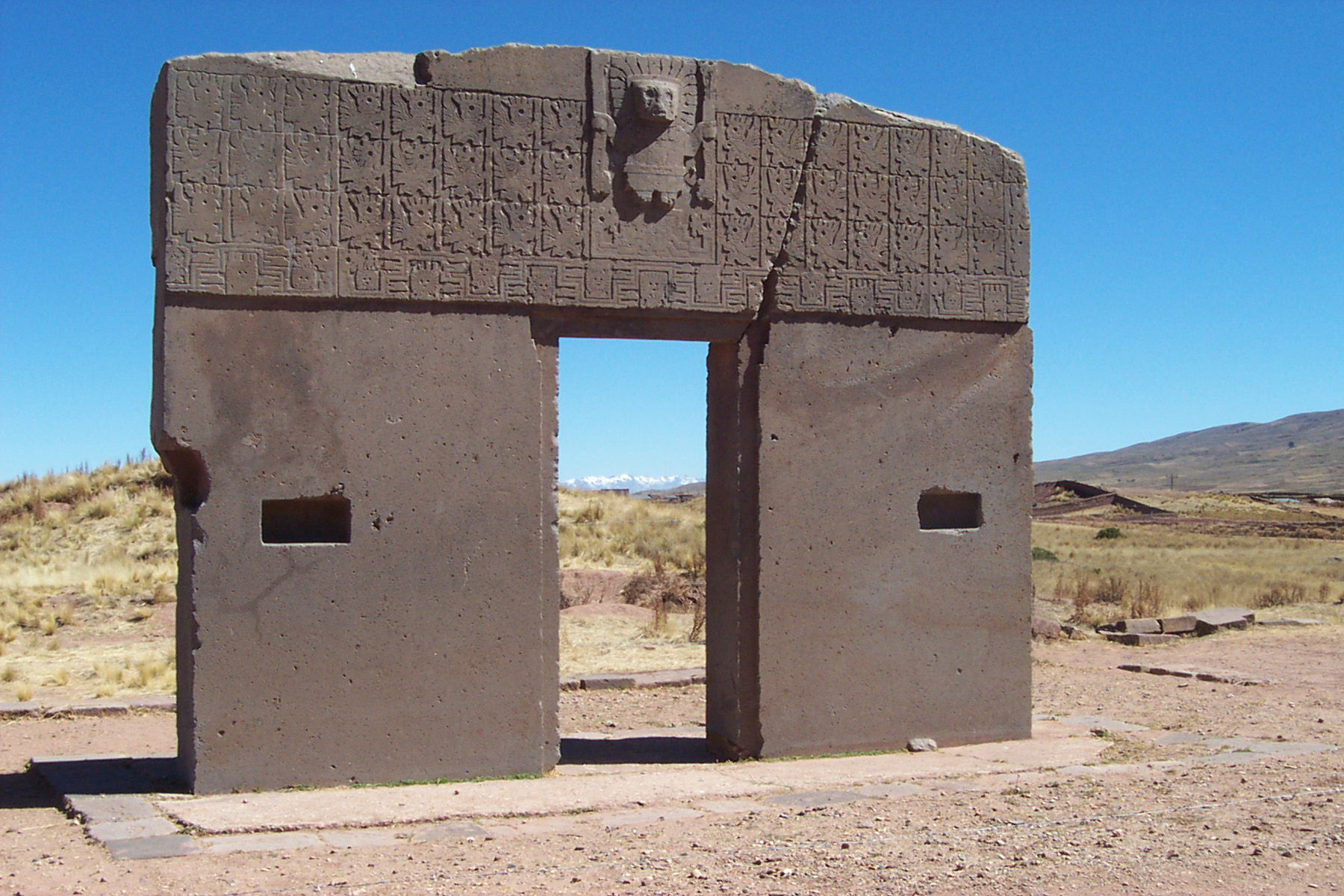
- Gate of the Sun in Tiwanaku

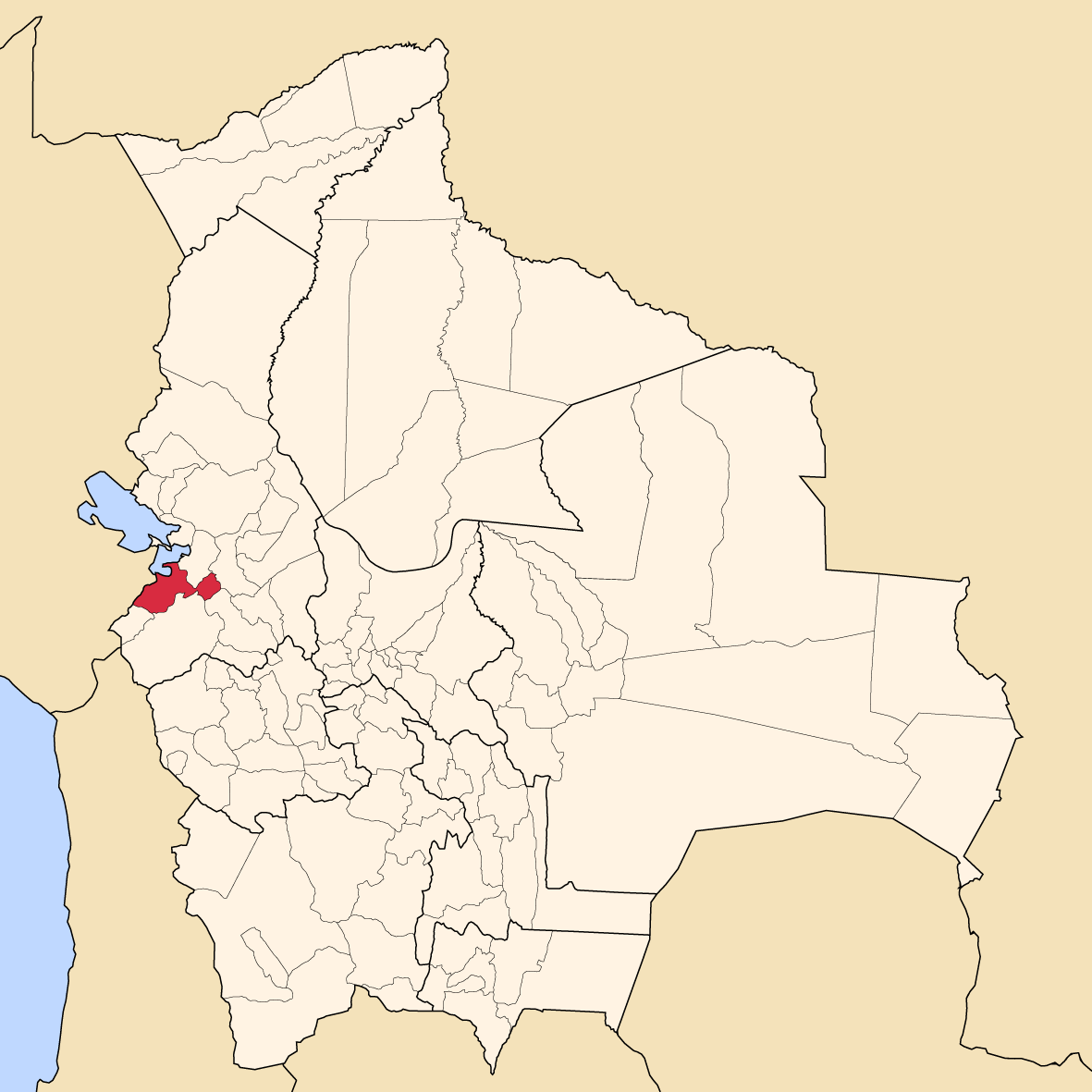
- Location of Ingavi Province within Bolivia

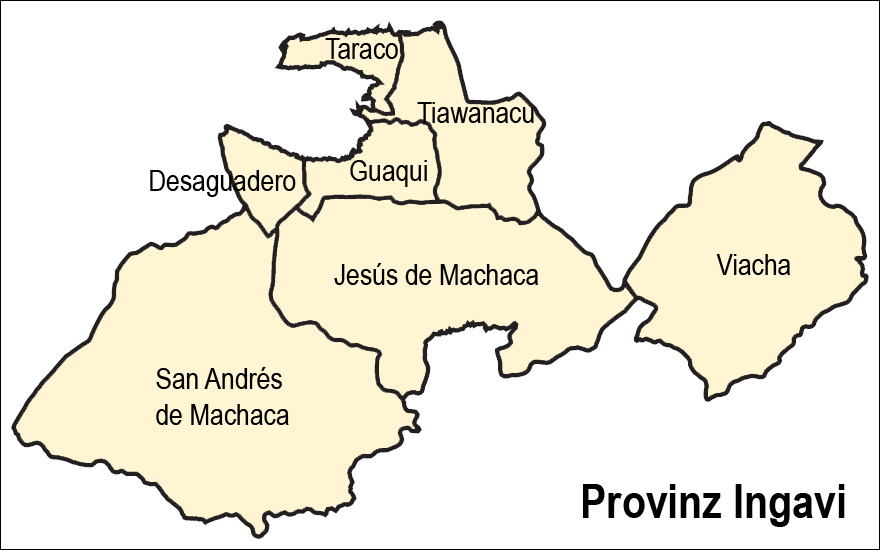
- Map of municipalities of Ingavi
- Coordinates: 16°43′0″S 68°50′0″W
- Country: Bolivia
- Department: La Paz Department
- Municipalities: 7
- Capital: Viacha

Area
  - Total: 5,410 km^{2} (2,090 sq mi)

Population (2024 census)
  - Total: 175,787
  - Density: 32.5/km^{2} (84.2/sq mi)
  - Ethnicities: Aymara
- Time zone: UTC-4 (BOT)
- Website: Official website

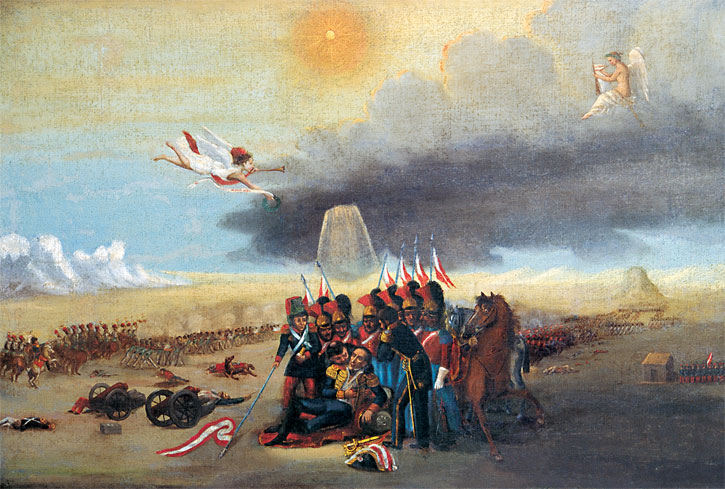
Battle of Ingavi

Ingavi is a province in the La Paz Department in Bolivia. This is where the Battle of Ingavi occurred on November 18, 1841, and where the World Heritage Site of Tiwanaku is situated.

During the presidency of Eliodoro Villazón the province was founded on December 16, 1909, with Viacha as its capital.

== Geography ==
Ingavi lies on the southern shore of Lake Titicaca. The Chilla-Kimsa Chata mountain range traverses the province. Some of the highest mountains of the province are listed below:

- Achachi Qala
- Apachita
- Asir Kunka
- Chuqi Ch'iwani
- Chuqi Q'awa
- Chuqi Q'awa (Chuñuni Jawira)
- Chhuxlla Willk'i
- Ch'alla Qullu
- Ch'utu Wankarani
- Imill Wawani
- Jach'a Uma Chuwani
- Jani Lawani
- Janq'u Jaqhi
- Jilarata
- Jisk'a Sallalla
- Laqaya
- Nasa Puqi
- Pukara (Guaqui)
- Pukara (J. de Machaca)
- Phujtir Pata Punta
- Qala Waxrani
- Quta Willk'i
- Q'awiri Qullu
- Q'ilani
- Q'ullq'uni
- Turini
- T'aqachiri
- Utani Apu
- Wayllani
- Wanq'uni
- Wila Qullu
- Wisk'achani

== Subdivision ==
Ingavi Province is divided into seven municipalities which are partly further subdivided into cantons.

Section	Municipality	Inhabitants (2001)	Inhabitants (2005, est.)	Seat
1st	Viacha Municipality	46,596	51,540	Viacha
2nd	Guaqui Municipality	7,552	8,608	Guaqui
3rd	Tiwanaku Municipality	11,309	12,936	Tiwanaku (village)
4th	Desaguadero Municipality	4,981	5,395	Desaguadero
5th	San Andrés de Machaca Municipality	6,299	6,967	San Andrés de Machaca
6th	Jesús de Machaca Municipality	13,247	14,653	Jesús de Machaca
7th	Taraco Municipality	5,922	6,774	Taraco

== Population ==
The people are predominantly indigenous citizens of Aymara descent.

Ethnic group	Viacha Municipality (%)	Guaqui Municipality (%)	Tiwanaku Municipality (%)	Desaguadero Municipality (%)	San Andrés de Machaca Municipality (%)	Jesús de Machaca Municipality (%)	Taraco Municipality (%)
Quechua	2.9	1.3	0.4	1.3	0.3	0.3	0.2
Aymara	84.4	91.1	96.1	92.9	96.0	94.4	96.4
Guaraní, Chiquitos, Moxos	0.2	0.3	0.1	0.2	0.1	0.1	0.0
Not indigenous	12.2	7.1	3.3	5.6	3.3	4.3	3.3
Other indigenous groups	0.2	0.1	0.0	0.1	0.4	0.9	0.1

== Tourist attractions ==
Some of the tourist attractions of the municipalities are:

- In Viacha Municipality:
  - The town of Viacha
  - Viliroco lagoon, a small man made lake in Viacha Canton
  - Qalachaka bridge in Viacha Canton
  - "Virgen de Letanías" Sanctuary in Viacha Canton
  - "Pan de Azúcar" mountain in Viacha Canton
  - Fields of the Battle of Ingavi in Viacha Canton
- In Guaqui Municipality:
  - Guaqui festivity from July 23 to July 25 celebrated in honour of Apostle James
  - Apostle James church of Guaqui built between 1625 and 1784
  - Guaqui port
- In Tiwanaku Municipality:
  - archaeological site of Tiwanaku in Tiwanaku Canton
  - Saint Peter church in Tiwanaku
  - Willkakuti, the Andean-Amazonic New Year, celebrated on June 21 of every year in the viewpoint of Kimsa Chata mountain in Tiwanaku Canton
  - Tiwanaku festivity (Señor de la Exaltación) celebrated in Tiwanaku Canton in September
- In Desaguadero Municipality:
  - The international fair of Desaguadero on the Peruvian border
  - Desaguadero River with its avifauna and native Aymara and Uru communities along its banks. The river runs along the entire Altiplano.
- In San Andrés de Machaca Municipality:
  - Afiani lagoon in San Andrés de Machaca Canton
  - The chullpa of Kañoma in San Andrés de Machaca Canton
  - The church of San Andrés de Machaca, built between 1806 and 1836
- In Jesús de Machaca Municipality:
  - The archaeological site of Qhunqhu Wankani in Jesús de Machaca Canton
  - Jesús de Machaca, an indigenous community
  - Yakayuni saltflats in Jesús de Machaca Canton where salt exploitation is possible
  - Uru Iruwit'u community in Jesús de Machaca Canton and the Uru Iruwit'u museum in Jesús de Machaca
- In Taraco Municipality:
  - Taraco Peninsula in Taraco Canton with its archaeological sites:
    - Chiripa and its museum
    - Qala Uyuni, Pumani and Achacachi Coacollo in Coacollo
    - Iwawi (Kolata Quenacache, Ojje Puku, Awichu and Ch'uxña Qala) in Higuagui Grande, Taraco Canton
  - Sikuya Island in Taraco Canton
  - The church of Taraco dating from 1767
  - Taraco museum in Taraco Canton

== See also ==
- Awallamaya Lake
- Ch'alla Jawira
- Jach'a Jawira
- Qullpa Jawira
- Thujsa Jawira
- Tiwanaku River
