= Desaguadero, Bolivia-Peru =

Desaguadero Huchusuma Chakamarka
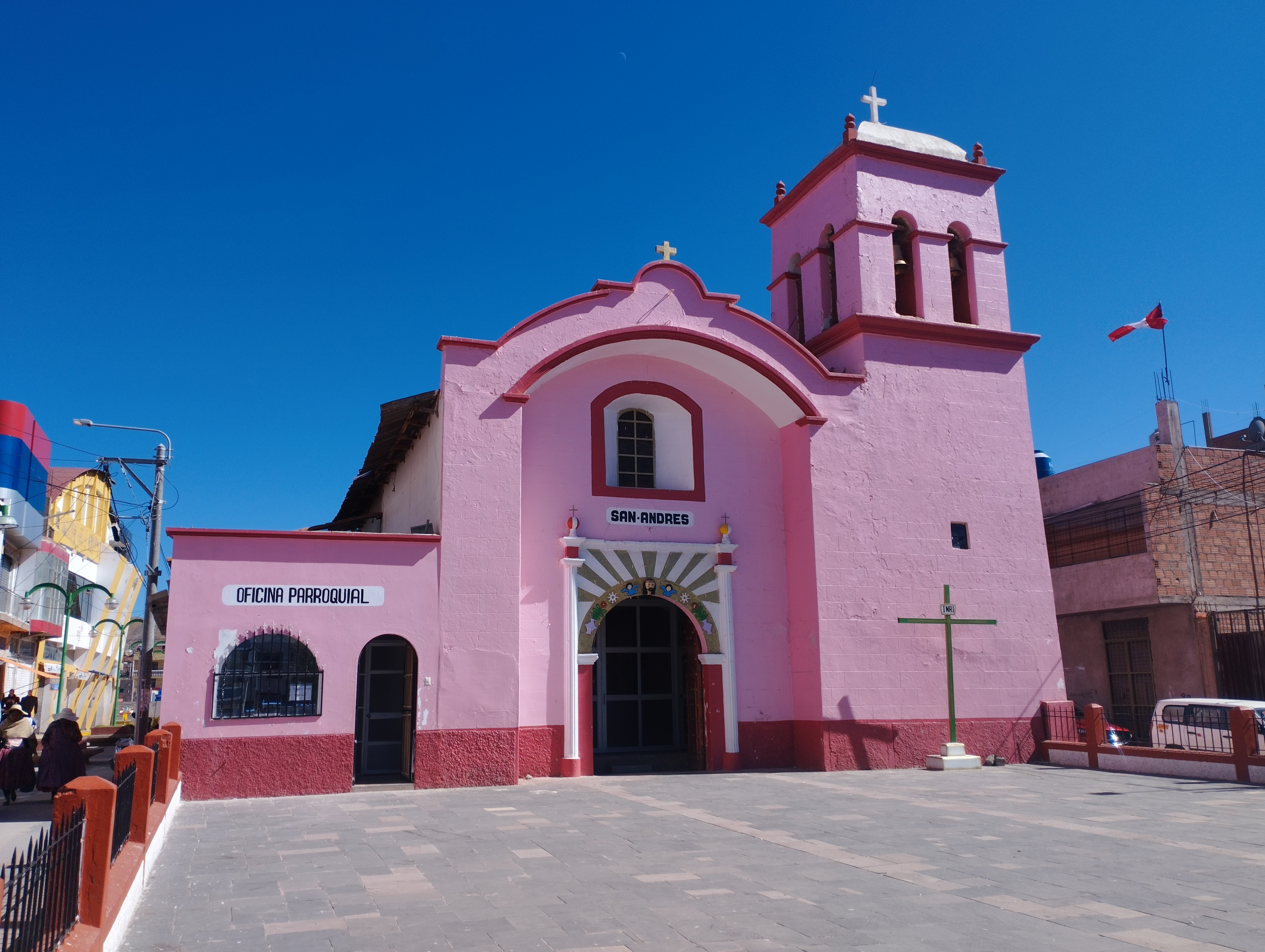
- Iglesia San Andres

- Location within Peru Location within Bolivia
- Coordinates: 16°34′S 69°00′W
- Country: Peru, Bolivia
- Region: Puno Region (PE)
- Province: Chucuito Province (PE)
- District: Desaguadero District (PE)
- Department: La Paz Department (BO)
- Province: Ingavi Province (BO)
- Municipality: Desaguadero Municipality (BO)

Government
  - Mayor: Gumercindo Pari Escobar (2014-2018) (PE)
  - Mayor: Wilfredo Acarapi Aruquipa (2015-2020) (BO)
- Elevation: 12,556 ft (3,827 m)

Population (2001)
  - Total: 2,219
- Time zones: UTC-5 (PET)
- UTC-4 (BOT)
- Website: munidesaguadero.gob.pe

Desaguadero (Spanish for "channel, drain for drawing off superfluous water") or Chaka Marka (Aymara and Quechua for "bridge village") is a town on the Bolivian-Peruvian border. On the Bolivian side it is situated in the La Paz Department, Ingavi Province, Desaguadero Municipality, Desaguadero Canton. On the Peruvian side it lies in the Puno Region, Chucuito Province, Desaguadero District. Both parts of the town are united by a binational bridge.

The town is located 86 km from La Paz, 146 km from Puno city and 190 km from Juliaca.

== Climate ==
Desaguadero has a tropical subalpine climate (Cwc).

Climate data for Desaguadero, elevation 3,833 m (12,575 ft), (1991–2020)
Month	Jan	Feb	Mar	Apr	May	Jun	Jul	Aug	Sep	Oct	Nov	Dec	Year
Mean daily maximum °C (°F)	15.3 (59.5)	15.3 (59.5)	15.3 (59.5)	15.2 (59.4)	14.6 (58.3)	13.4 (56.1)	13.1 (55.6)	13.9 (57.0)	14.9 (58.8)	16.1 (61.0)	16.8 (62.2)	16.4 (61.5)	15.0 (59.0)
Mean daily minimum °C (°F)	5.3 (41.5)	5.6 (42.1)	5.4 (41.7)	3.3 (37.9)	−0.8 (30.6)	−3.0 (26.6)	−3.1 (26.4)	−2.2 (28.0)	0.6 (33.1)	2.5 (36.5)	3.5 (38.3)	5.0 (41.0)	1.8 (35.3)
Average precipitation mm (inches)	180.9 (7.12)	158.3 (6.23)	108.5 (4.27)	36.3 (1.43)	5.1 (0.20)	7.1 (0.28)	6.8 (0.27)	13.0 (0.51)	18.6 (0.73)	33.5 (1.32)	43.1 (1.70)	88.0 (3.46)	699.2 (27.52)
Source: National Meteorology and Hydrology Service of Peru
