= Viacha =

Viacha Wiyacha vaicha
- City
- Nickname: wacha
- Location in Bolivia
- Coordinates: 16°39′12″S 68°18′6″W
- Country: Bolivia
- Department: La Paz Department
- Province: Ingavi Province
- Municipality: Viacha Municipality

Area
  - Total: 4.7 km^{2} (1.8 sq mi)
- Elevation: 3,871 m (12,700 ft)

Population (2012)
  - Total: 38,457
  - Density: 8,200/km^{2} (21,000/sq mi)
- Time zone: UTC-4 (BOT)
- Climate: Cwc

Viacha (Aymara: Wiyacha) is a city in Bolivia, situated in the Ingavi Province in the La Paz Department. Viacha lies in the Altiplano, 22 km southwest of La Paz. Transportation to and from the city includes cars, buses, and a train.

== Economy ==
Viacha is home to one of the largest cement factories in Bolivia, 'Cemento Viacha,' which is part of SOBOCE . Other sources of income for the city include agriculture, mainly consisting of potatoes.

== Culture ==
The location of Viacha, which lies close to Lake Titicaca and Tiawanaku, makes it a cultural center for the Irohito-Urus. These descendants of the Incas have lived in this area for hundreds of years.

== Climate ==
Climate data for Viacha, elevation 3,850 m (12,630 ft)
| Month | Jan | Feb | Mar | Apr | May | Jun | Jul | Aug | Sep | Oct | Nov | Dec | Year |
|---|---|---|---|---|---|---|---|---|---|---|---|---|---|
| Mean daily maximum °C (°F) | 17.0 (62.6) | 17.1 (62.8) | 17.1 (62.8) | 17.4 (63.3) | 16.8 (62.2) | 15.7 (60.3) | 16.0 (60.8) | 16.8 (62.2) | 17.5 (63.5) | 18.2 (64.8) | 18.4 (65.1) | 17.8 (64.0) | 17.2 (62.9) |
| Daily mean °C (°F) | 10.5 (50.9) | 10.4 (50.7) | 10.0 (50.0) | 8.8 (47.8) | 6.2 (43.2) | 4.2 (39.6) | 4.4 (39.9) | 5.7 (42.3) | 7.8 (46.0) | 9.4 (48.9) | 10.2 (50.4) | 10.5 (50.9) | 8.2 (46.7) |
| Mean daily minimum °C (°F) | 4.0 (39.2) | 3.8 (38.8) | 3.0 (37.4) | 0.3 (32.5) | −4.3 (24.3) | −7.4 (18.7) | −7.2 (19.0) | −5.3 (22.5) | −1.7 (28.9) | 0.6 (33.1) | 2.0 (35.6) | 3.3 (37.9) | −0.7 (30.7) |
| Average precipitation mm (inches) | 133.3 (5.25) | 90.4 (3.56) | 69.1 (2.72) | 28.3 (1.11) | 11.1 (0.44) | 4.4 (0.17) | 6.5 (0.26) | 12.5 (0.49) | 26.4 (1.04) | 36.0 (1.42) | 51.2 (2.02) | 85.6 (3.37) | 554.8 (21.85) |
| Average precipitation days | 18.1 | 14.7 | 12.4 | 5.9 | 2.4 | 1.0 | 1.3 | 2.4 | 5.1 | 7.0 | 9.0 | 13.8 | 93.1 |
| Average relative humidity (%) | 64.1 | 66.1 | 65.6 | 61.8 | 54.6 | 51.3 | 50.7 | 49.4 | 51.1 | 52.4 | 54.3 | 57.1 | 56.5 |
Source: Servicio Nacional de Meteorología e Hidrología de Bolivia
