= Phujtir Pata Punta =

Mountain in Bolivia

Phuj
- Location within Bolivia

Highest point
- Elevation: 4,661 m (15,292 ft)
- Coordinates: 16°41′20″S 68°34′09″W

Geography
- Location: Bolivia; La Paz Department
- Parent range: Andes, Chilla-Kimsa Chata

Phuj Mountain (Aymara phujtiri a kind of woven shoulder cloth, pata step, Spanish punta point, also spelled Phūj Mountain) is a 4,661-metre-high (15,292 ft) mountain in the Chilla-Kimsa Chata mountain range in the Andes of Bolivia. It lies in the La Paz Department, Ingavi Province, Jesús de Machaca Municipality, and in the Los Andes Province, Laja Municipality. Phuj Mountain is situated south-east of the mountain Asir Kunka.
