= Tiwanaku Municipality =

- Municipality
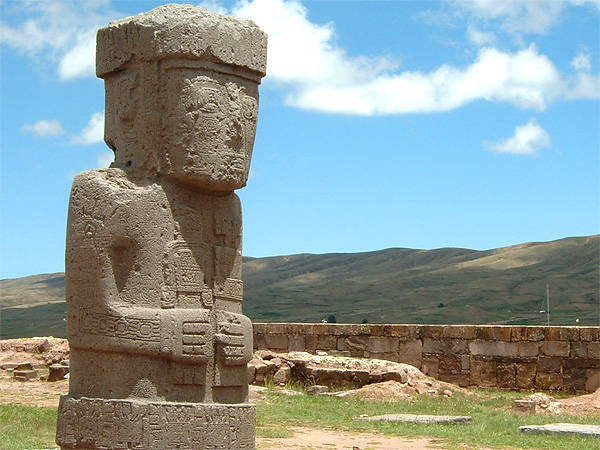
- The Ponce Monolith, Tiwanaku,

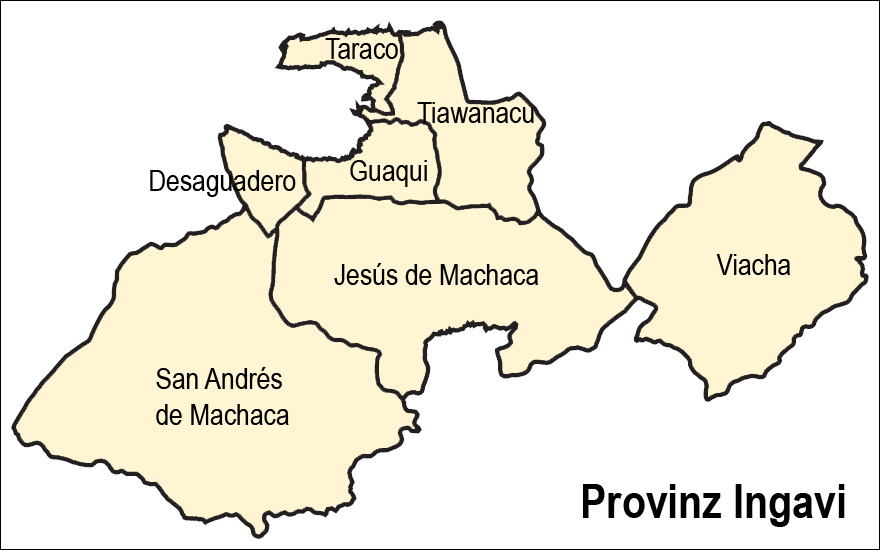
- Location of the municipality within the Ingavi Province

- Location of the Tiwanaku Municipality within Bolivia
- Coordinates: 16°35′0″S 68°40′0″W
- Country: Bolivia
- Department: La Paz Department
- Province: Ingavi Province
- Foundation: November 22, 1947
- Seat: Tiwanaku (village)

Government
  - Mayor: Eulogia Quispe Cabrera (2008)
  - President: Laureano Coronel Quispe (2008)

Area
  - Total: 134 sq mi (347 km^{2})
- Elevation: 12,800 ft (3,900 m)

Population (2001)
  - Total: 11,309
- Time zone: UTC-4 (BOT)

Tiwanaku Municipality is the third municipal section of the Ingavi Province in the La Paz Department, Bolivia. Its seat is the village of Tiwanaku located near the UNESCO World Heritage Site Tiwanaku.

== Cantons ==
The municipality is divided into three cantons. They are (their seats in parentheses):

- Huacullani - (Huacullani)
- Pillapi San Agustín - (Pillapi San Agustín)
- Tiwanaku - (Tiwanaku village)

== The people ==
The people are predominantly indigenous citizens of Aymara descent.

Ethnic group	%
Quechua	0.4
Aymara	96.1
Guaraní, Chiquitos, Moxos	0.1
Not indigenous	3.3
Other indigenous groups	0.0

Some data:

Census	1992	2001
Inhabitants	9,477	11,309
Rural	9,477	11,309
Urban	0	0
Total fertility rate	6.8	4.7
Infant mortality	77.1	72.2
Net migration rate	n	-12.6

== Languages ==
The languages spoken in the Tiwanaku Municipality are mainly Aymara and Spanish.

Language	Inhabitants
Quechua	76
Aymara	10,154
Guaraní	4
Another native	41
Spanish	6,899
Foreign	28
Only native	3,913
Native and Spanish	6,261
Only Spanish	640

== Tourist attractions ==
Some of the tourist attractions of the municipality are:

- the archaeological site of Tiwanaku in the Tiwanaku Canton
- Saint Peter church in Tiwanaku
- Willkakuti, the Andean-Amazonic New Year, celebrated on June 21 of every year in the viewpoint of Kimsa Chata mountain in the Tiwanaku Canton
- Tiwanaku festivity (Señor de la Exaltación) celebrated in the Tiwanaku Canton in September

== See also ==
- Chuqi Ch'iwani
- Ch'alla Jawira
- Laqaya
- Nasa Puqi
- Qaluyu
- Tiwanaku River
- Wila Qullu
