= Guaqui =

Bolivian municipality

Coordinates: 16°35′00″S 68°52′00″W

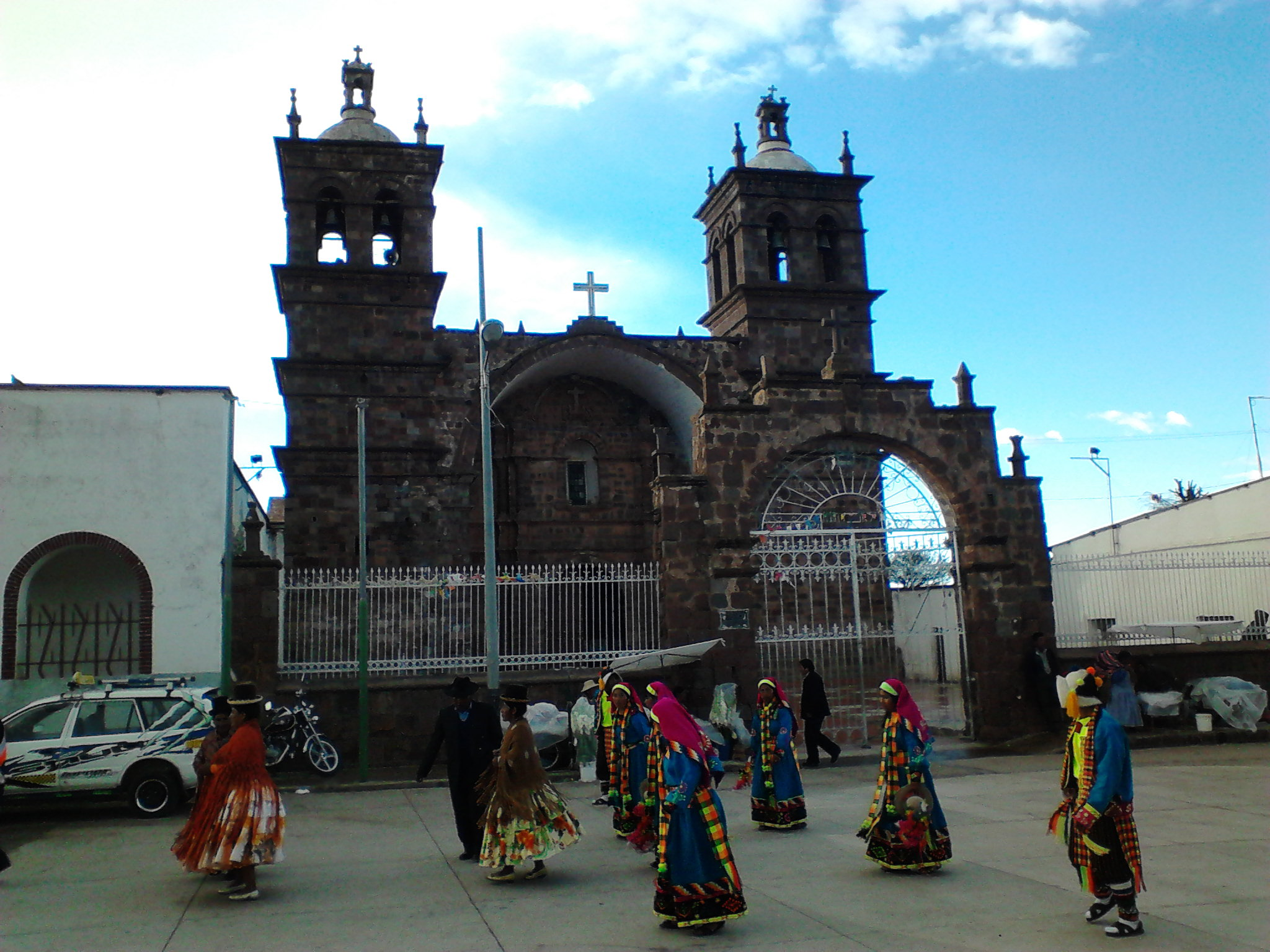
The church of Guaqui

Guaqui is a railhead and port in Bolivia on Lake Titicaca. A ferry (a car float) connects with the Peruvian railhead and port on Puno. It served as location of Inca ruins prior to the arrival of the Spanish. The towns current church sites on what was the ancient ruins.

== Elevation ==
Guaqui's elevation is 3,822 metres (12,539 ft).

== Transportation ==
=== Roads ===
The RN-1 is a major road that runs through Guaqui with connections to neighboring Peru.

=== Rail ===
The railways on the Bolivian side are 1,000 mm (3 ft 3 3/8 in) gauge, while the railways on the Peruvian side are 1,435 mm (4 ft 8 1/2 in) gauge. Cars are transported over water by car float Manco Capac owned by PeruRail.

=== Water ===
Guaqui is also home/port to Bolivian Navy flotilla.

=== Air ===
The closest airport to Guaqui is El Alto International Airport to the east.

== See also ==
- Transport in Bolivia
- Transport in Peru
