= Chilla-Kimsa Chata mountain range =

Mountain in Bolivia

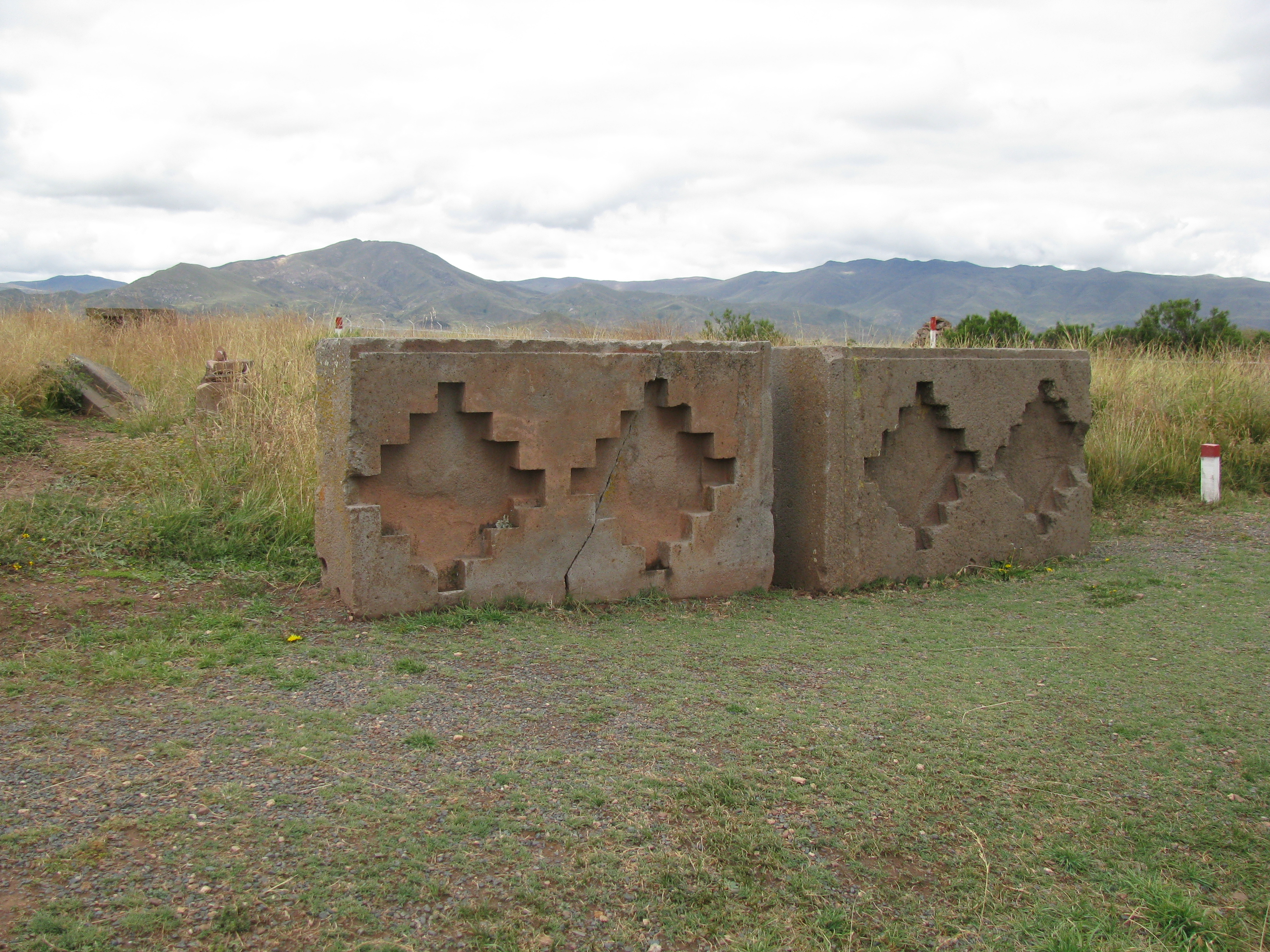
- Chilla-Kimsa Chata mountain range as seen from Tiwanaku (looking south).

Highest point
- Peak: Laqaya
- Elevation: 4,825 m (15,830 ft)
- Coordinates: 16°41′S 68°43′W

Geography
- Country: Bolivia
- Parent range: Andes

The Chilla-Kimsa Chata mountain range (also spelled Kimsachata, Aymara and Quechua kimsa three, Pukina chata mountain, "three mountains", Hispanicized spellings Quimsachata, Quimsa Chata) is situated in Bolivia south east of Wiñaymarka Lake, the southern part of Lake Titicaca, in the La Paz Department, Ingavi Province. The range is named after one of highest mountains, the Kimsa Chata complex rising up to 4,735 metres (15,535 ft) about 15 km south of Tiwanaku.

The range stretches from north to south-east almost parallel to the Taraco range north of it. Wakira River flows through the valley between the two ranges and Jach'a Jawira flows along its southern slopes.

== Mountains ==
Some of the highest elevations of the range are listed below.

- Laqaya, 4,825 m (15,830 ft)
- Chuqi Q'awa, 4,790 m (15,720 ft)
- Qala Cruz, 4,737 m (15,541 ft)
- Kimsa Chata, 4,735 m (15,535 ft)
- K'uruni, 4,735 m (15,535 ft)
- Nasa Puqi, 4,735 m (15,535 ft)
- Chuqi Ch'iwani, 4,695 m (15,404 ft)
- Chhuxlla Willk'i, 4,664 m (15,302 ft)
- Phujtir Pata Punta, 4,661 m (15,292 ft)
- Ch'alla Qullu, 4,660 m (15,290 ft)
- Asir Kunka, 4,641 m (15,226 ft)
- Tanka Tankani, 4,618 m (15,151 ft)
- Jani Lawani, 4,605 m (15,108 ft)
- Achachi Qala, 4,600 m (15,100 ft)
- Machaqa Wila Qullu, 4,600 m (15,100 ft)
- Wanq'uni, 4,599 m (15,089 ft)
- Quta Willk'i, 4,595 m (15,075 ft)
- Wisk'achani, 4,585 m (15,043 ft)
- Anta Q'awa, 4,584 m (15,039 ft)
- Janq'u Apachita, 4,570 m (14,990 ft)
- Q'ullq'uni, 4,570 m (14,990 ft)
- Chuqi Q'awa, 4,570 m (14,990 ft)
- Jisk'a Sallalla, 4,559 m (14,957 ft)
- Apachita, 4,556 m (14,948 ft)
- Chullunkayani, 4,523 m (14,839 ft)
- Imill Wawani, 4,505 m (14,780 ft)
- Chilla, c. 4,500 m (14,800 ft)
- Ch'utu Wankarani, 4,475 m (14,682 ft)
- Tuyjata, 4,432 m (14,541 ft)
- Wila Qullu, 4,400 m (14,400 ft)
- Jach'a Uma Chuwani, 4,351 m (14,275 ft)
- Qala Waxrani, 4,315 m (14,157 ft)
- Pukara, 4,329 m (14,203 ft)
- Jach'a Qullu, 4,305 m (14,124 ft)
- Qala P'axrani, 4,262 m (13,983 ft)
- Janq'u Jaqhi, 4,254 m (13,957 ft)
- Q'ilani, 4,216 m (13,832 ft)
- Turini, 4,212 m (13,819 ft)
- Qaluyu, 4,202 m (13,786 ft)
- T'aqachiri, 4,100 m (13,500 ft)
- Wayllani, 4,172 m (13,688 ft)
- Yawri, 4,142 m (13,589 ft)
- Chuqi Wislla, 4,126 m (13,537 ft)
- Jach'a Wankarani, c. 4,040 m (13,250 ft)
- Janq'u Marka, 4,033 m (13,232 ft)
- Wankarani, 4,009 m (13,153 ft)
- Q'awiri Qullu, 4,000 m (13,000 ft)
