= Jach'a Jawira (Ingavi) =

- Etymology: Aymara

Location
- Country: Bolivia
- Region: La Paz Department

Physical characteristics
- Source
  - location: Ingavi Province, Jesús de Machaca Municipality;Pacajes Province, Comanche Municipality
  - coordinates: 16°48′55″S 68°35′55″W
- Mouth: Desaguadero River
  - location: Ingavi Province
  - coordinates: 16°49′00″S 68°54′00″W

Basin features
- Tributaries
  - right: Chuñu Jawira, Titiri, Chuqi Q'awa, Qura Jawira, Qupa Jaqhi Jawira, Chuqi Q'awa (Achuma)

The Jach'a Jawira (Aymara jach'a big, great, jawira river, "big river", also spelled Jachcha Jahuira) is a river in the La Paz Department of Bolivia, south of Wiñaymarka, the southern branch of Lake Titicaca. It is a tributary of the Desaguadero River.

It originates from the confluence of various streams and rivers at the border of the Ingavi Province, Jesús de Machaca Municipality, and the Pacajes Province, Comanche Municipality, southwest of the village of Chama. Some of these tributaries are Llallawa, Santa María, Wanq'uri and Ñiq'i Jawira ("mud river"). The direction of the Jach'a Jawira is mainly to the west.

It flows along the southern slopes of the Chilla-Kimsa Chata mountain range. Some of its affluents from the range are Chuñu Jawira, Titiri, Chuqi Q'awa, Qurani, Qupa Jaqhi Jawira and another river named Chuqi Q'awa (or Achuma).

The Jach'a Jawira meets the Desaguadero River at the southern end of Awallamaya Lake, south of the village of Awallamaya in the Ingavi Province, Jesús de Machaca Municipality, Awallamaya Canton.
