= Jisk'a Sallalla =

Mountain in Bolivia

- Location within Bolivia

Highest point
- Elevation: 4,559 m (14,957 ft)
- Coordinates: 16°44′31″S 68°33′59″W

Geography
- Location: Bolivia; La Paz Department
- Parent range: Andes, Chilla-Kimsa Chata

Jisk'a Sallalla (Aymara jisk'a little, sallalla a big heap of quinoa, Sallalla a mountain next to Jisk'a Sallalla, "little Sallalla", also spelled Jiskha Sallala) is a 4,559-metre-high (14,957 ft) mountain in the Chilla-Kimsa Chata mountain range in the Andes of Bolivia. It is situated in the La Paz Department, Ingavi Province, Jesús de Machaca Municipality. Jisk'a Sallalla lies south-west of the mountains Wisk'achani and Sallalla.
