= Wiñaymarka Lake =

Southern branch of Lake Titicaca, Bolivia and Peru

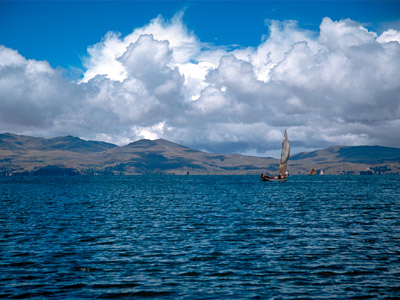
- Wiñaymarka

- Location within Bolivia Location within Peru Location within South America
- Interactive map of Wiñaymarka Lake
- Location: Bolivia and Peru
- Coordinates: 16°20′S 68°50′W
- Part of: Lake Titicaca

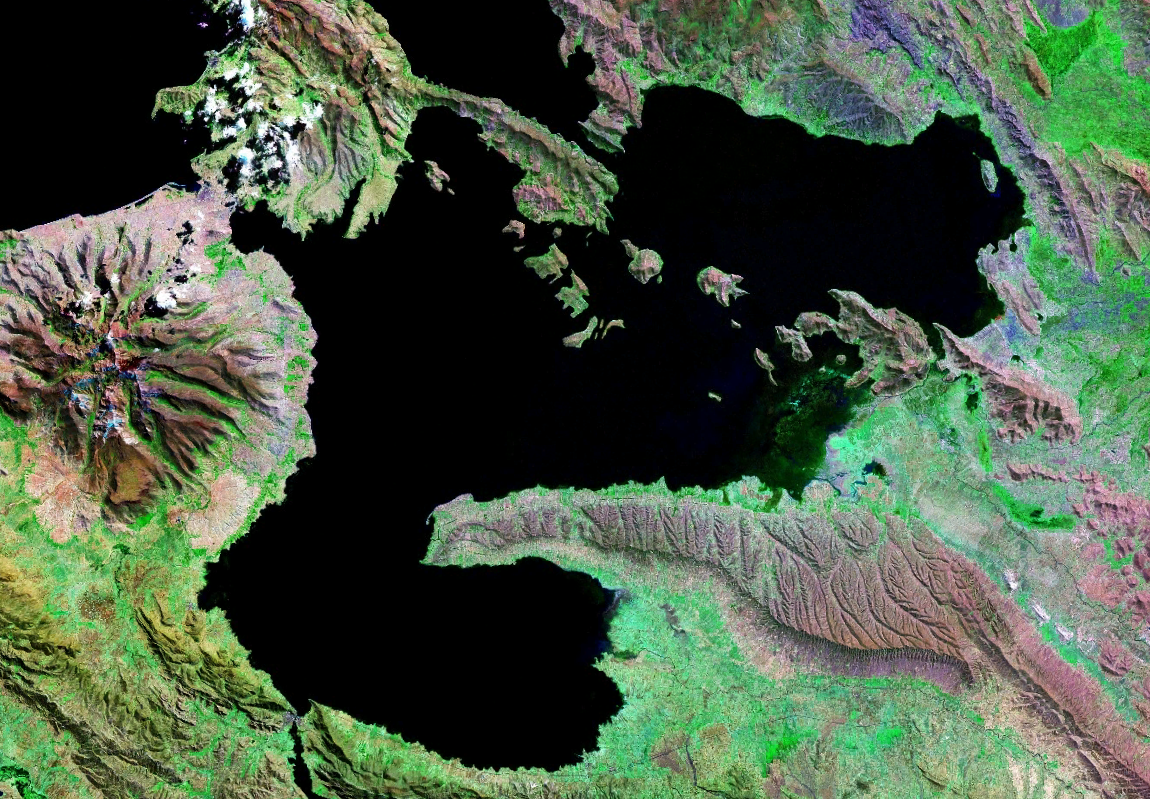
Map of Wiñaymarka (NASA)

Wiñaymarka Lake (also: Huiñaymarca) is the southern branch of Lake Titicaca in Bolivia and Peru. The lake is hypothesised to have dried up during the Middle Formative Period as a result of a long-term drop in precipitation in the Altiplano from 400 to 200 BCE.
