= Nasa Q'ara (disambiguation) =

Nasa Q'ara is a mountain north of Allqa Quta in the Pucarani Municipality, Los Andes Province, La Paz Department, Bolivia.

Nasa Q'ara (Aymara "bare-nosed", also spelled Nasa Kara, Nasa Khara, Nasacara, Nasaqara, Nasaq'ara, Nazacara) may refer to:

- Nasa Q'ara (Loayza), a mountain in the Loayza Province, La Paz Department, Bolivia
- Nasa Q'ara (Wawanaki), a mountain southwest of Allqa Quta near Wawanaki in the Pucarani Municipality, Los Andes Province, La Paz Department, Bolivia
- Nazacara, a village in the Ingavi Province, La Paz Department, Bolivia
- Nazacara de Pacajes, a village in the Pacajes Province, La Paz Department, Bolivia
- Nazacara de Pacajes Municipality, a municipality in the Pacajes Province, La Paz Department, Bolivia
