= Taypi Chaka Quta =

Lake in La Paz Department, Bolivia

- Location within Bolivia Location within South America
- Interactive map of Taypi Chaka Quta
- Location: Bolivia, La Paz Department, Los Andes Province
- Coordinates: 16°12′21″S 68°21′03″W
- Surface elevation: 4,412 m (14,475 ft)

Taypi Chaka Quta (Aymara taypi center, middle, chaka bridge, quta lake, "middle bridge lake", Hispanicized spellings Taypi Chaca Kkota, Taypi Chaka Kkota) is a lake west of the Cordillera Real of Bolivia located in the La Paz Department, Los Andes Province, Pukarani Municipality, Tuquia Canton, on the border to Batallas Municipality. It is situated at a height of about 4,412 metres (14,475 ft), south west of Sura Quta, a lake connected with Taypi Chaka Quta by the Link'u River ("curve river") that flows down from the Cordillera Real towards Lake Titicaca.

== See also ==
- Allqa Quta
- Ch'iyar Quta
- Jach'a Jawira
- Juri Quta
- Lawrawani Lake
- Kunturiri
- Surikiña River
- Sura Quta (Patamanta)
