= Tira Qullu =

Mountain in Bolivia

- Location within Bolivia

Highest point
- Elevation: 4,832 m (15,853 ft)
- Coordinates: 16°12′09″S 68°18′53″W

Geography
- Location: Bolivia, La Paz Department, Los Andes Province, Pucarani Municipality
- Parent range: Andes, Cordillera Real

Tira Qullu (Aymara tira cradle, qullu mountain, "cradle mountain", also spelled Tira Kkollu) is a 4,832-metre-high (15,853 ft) mountain in the western extension of the Cordillera Real in the Andes of Bolivia. It is located in the La Paz Department, Los Andes Province, Pucarani Municipality. Tira Qullu lies between the lakes Sura Quta and Taypi Chaka Quta in the west and Juri Quta in the east. It is situated south-west of the mountains Jach'a Jipiña and Milluni.
