= Ch'alla Jawira (disambiguation) =

Ch'alla Jawira (Aymara ch'alla sand, jawira river, "sand river", also spelled Challa Jahuira, Challajahuira) may refer to:

- Ch'alla Jawira, a river in the provinces of Aroma and Pacajes, La Paz Department, Bolivia
- Ch'alla Jawira or Llallawa Jawira, a river in the municipalities of Calacoto and Callapa, Pacajes Province, La Paz Department, Bolivia
- Ch'alla Jawira (Callapa), a river in the Callapa Municipality, Pacajes Province, La Paz Department, Bolivia
- Ch'alla Jawira (Ingavi), a river in the Ingavi Province, La Paz Department, Bolivia
