= Pura Purani T'uxu =

Mountain in Bolivia

- Location within Bolivia

Highest point
- Elevation: 5,416 m (17,769 ft)
- Coordinates: 16°8′03″S 68°17′33″W

Geography
- Location: Bolivia, La Paz Department, Los Andes Province, Pucarani
- Parent range: Andes, Cordillera Real

Climbing
- First ascent: 1984

Pura Purani T'uxu or Pura Purani Tuqu (Aymara pura pura Xenophyllum (or a species of it), -ni a suffix to indicate ownership, "the one with the pura pura plant", t'uxu window or tuqu goitre, also spelled Purapurani Thojo) is a 5,416-metre-high (17,769 ft) mountain in the Cordillera Real in the Andes of Bolivia. It is located in the La Paz Department, Los Andes Province, Pucarani Municipality. It lies northeast of Nasa Q'ara and north of a lake named Allqa Quta. The small lake northwest of the mountain is Khunu Quta ("snow lake").
