= Ch'iyar Qullu (Los Andes) =

Mountain in Bolivia

- Location within Bolivia

Highest point
- Elevation: 4,778 m (15,676 ft)
- Coordinates: 16°15′20″S 68°16′59″W

Geography
- Location: Bolivia, La Paz Department, Los Andes Province, Pucarani
- Parent range: Andes, Cordillera Real

Ch'iyar Qullu (Aymara ch'iyara black, qullu mountain, "black mountain", also spelled Chiar Khollu) is a 4,778-metre-high (15,676 ft) mountain in the western extension of the Cordillera Real in the Andes of Bolivia. It is situated in the La Paz Department, Los Andes Province, Pucarani Municipality. Ch'iyar Qullu lies southwest of Tuni Lake, between the rivers Kunturiri in the north and Tuni in the south.

== See also ==
- Jach'a Jipiña
- Qullpani
