= Sura Quta (Patamanta) =

Lake in La Paz Department, Bolivia

- Location within Bolivia Location within South America
- Interactive map of Sura Quta
- Location: Bolivia, La Paz Department, Los Andes Province
- Coordinates: 16°14′55″S 68°12′55″W
- Surface elevation: 4,532 m (14,869 ft)

Sura Quta (Aymara sura dry jiquima, a species of Pachyrhizus, quta lake, "sura lake", hispanicized spellings Sora Kkota, Sora Kota) is a small lake west of the Cordillera Real of Bolivia located in the La Paz Department, Los Andes Province, Pukarani Municipality, Patamanta Canton, south east of the Kunturiri massif and Tuni Lake. It is situated at a height of about 4,532 metres (14,869 ft), about 0.4 km long and 0.36 km at its widest point.

== See also ==
- Alka Quta
- Ch'iyar Quta
- Jach'a Jawira
- Juri Quta
- Lawrawani Lake
- Surikiña River
