= Urqipi =

Mountain in Bolivia

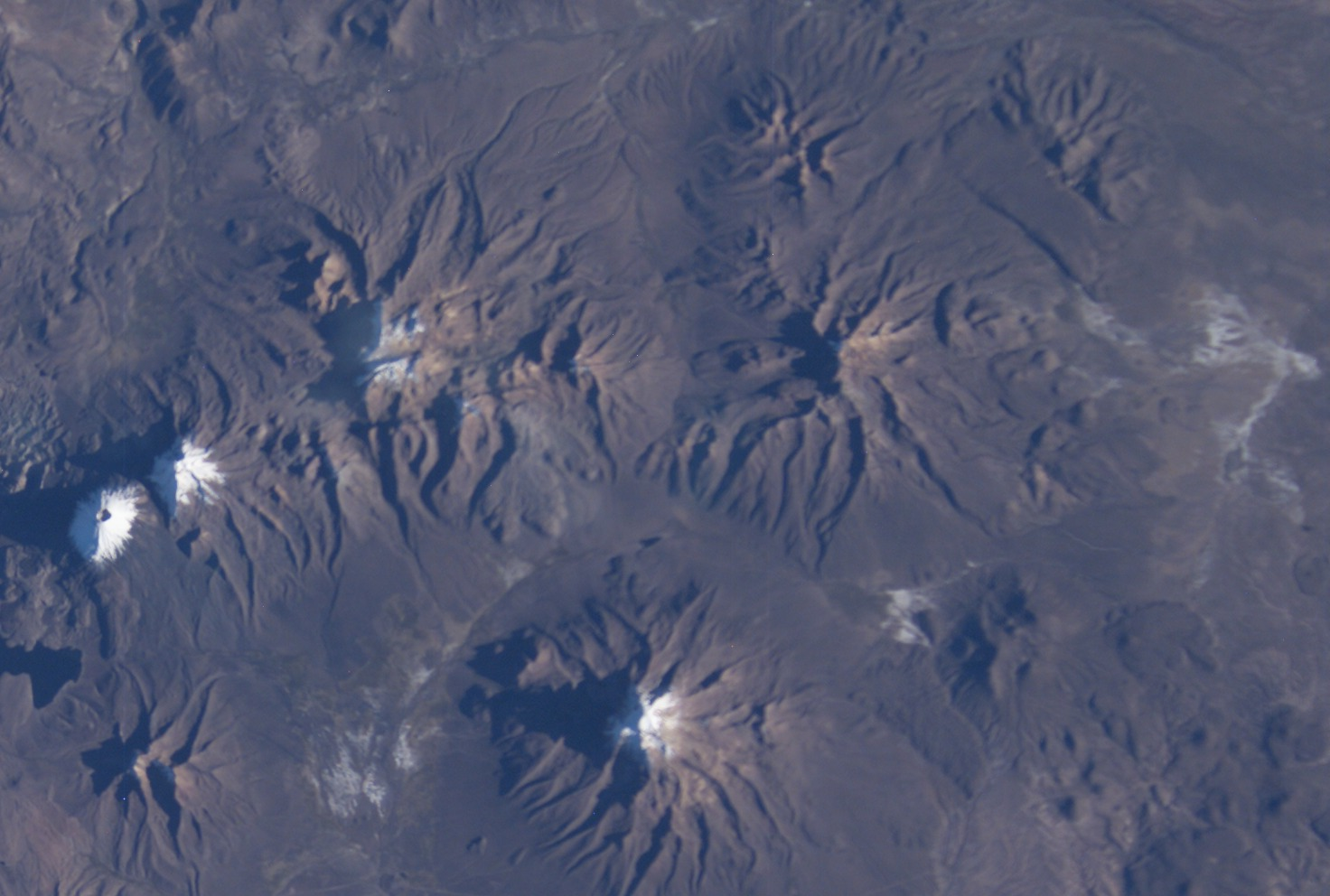
- Urqipi is visible in the upper right part of this satellite image. Sajama volcano is shown in the lower center.

Highest point
- Elevation: 4,230 m (13,880 ft)
- Coordinates: 17°46′26″S 68°55′20″W

Geography
- Location within Bolivia
- Location: Bolivia, La Paz Department
- Parent range: Andes

Urqipi (Aymara urqu male, ipi a small wild potato, also spelled Orkhepi) is a 4,230-metre-high (13,878 ft) mountain in the Andes of Bolivia. It lies in the La Paz Department, Pacajes Province, Calacoto Municipality, north of the Anallajsi volcano. It is located at the Achuta River, north-east of the mountain Pukara and north of the mountain Churi Willk'i.

== See also ==
- Pichaqa
