= Chinchillani (Bolivia) =

Mountain in Bolivia

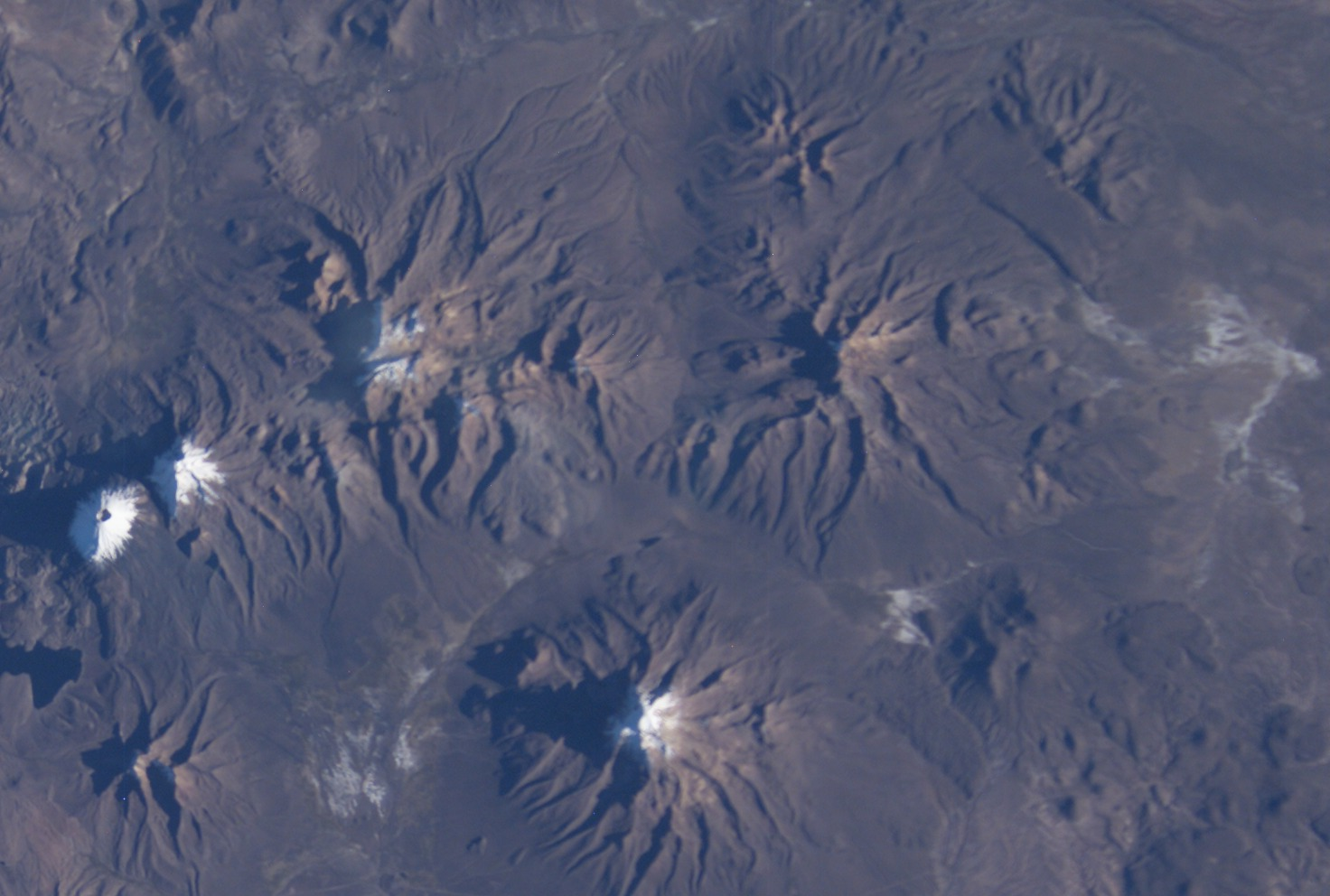
- Chinchillani is shown in the upper part of this satellite image (center, right). Sajama volcano is in the lower center.

Highest point
- Elevation: 4,840 m (15,880 ft)
- Coordinates: 17°52′32″S 68°59′18″W

Geography
- Location within Bolivia
- Location: Bolivia, La Paz Department, Pacajes Province
- Parent range: Andes

Chinchillani (Aymara chinchilla a kind of rodent, -ni a suffix, "the one with the chinchillas) is a mountain in the Andes of Bolivia which reaches a height of approximately 4,840 m (15,880 ft). It is located in the La Paz Department, Pacajes Province, Calacoto Municipality. It is southwest of Suni Q'awa and northwest of Ch'uxña Quta.
