= Sura Quta (Wayna Potosí) =

Lake in La Paz Department, Bolivia

- Location within Bolivia Location within South America
- Interactive map of Sura Quta
- Location: Bolivia, La Paz Department, Los Andes Province
- Coordinates: 16°11′20″S 68°20′36″W
- Surface elevation: 4,491 m (14,734 ft)

Sura Quta (Aymara sura dry jiquima, a species of Pachyrhizus, quta lake, "sura lake", hispanicized spellings Sora Kkota, Sora Kota) is a lake west of the Cordillera Real of Bolivia located in the La Paz Department, Los Andes Province, Pukarani Municipality, Wayna Potosí Canton, on the border to Batallas Municipality. It is situated at a height of about 4,491 metres (14,734 ft), about 1.77 km long and 0.7 km at its widest point. Sura Quta lies north east of Taypi Chaka Quta. The lakes are connected by the Link'u River ("curve river") that flows down from the Cordillera Real towards Lake Titicaca.

== See also ==
- Allqa Quta
- Ch'iyar Quta
- Jach'a Jawira
- Juri Quta
- Lawrawani Lake
- Kunturiri
- Surikiña River
