= Lawrawani Lake =

Lake in La Paz Department, Bolivia

- Lago Labrahuani
- Location within Bolivia Location within South America
- Interactive map of Lawrawani Lake
- Location: Bolivia, La Paz Department, Los Andes Province
- Coordinates: 16°08′20″S 68°24′25″W
- Surface elevation: 4,475 m (14,682 ft)

Lawrawani (Aymara lawrawa feather of the qaqi, a species of bird, -ni Aymara suffix to indicate ownership, "the one that has got plumage of the qaqi" or "the one with plumage of the qaqi", hispanicized spelling Labrahuani) is a lake west of the Cordillera Real of Bolivia located in the La Paz Department, Los Andes Province, Batallas Municipality, Kirani Canton. It is situated at a height of about 4,475 metres (14,682 ft), south-west and west of two slightly larger lakes, Khotia Quta and Q'ara Quta, and south-west of the mountains Warawarani and Phaq'u Kiwuta.

== See also ==
- Ch'iyar Quta
- Juri Quta
- Taypi Chaka Quta
- Kunturiri
- Sura Quta
