= Ch'iyara Salla =

Mountain in Bolivia

- Location within Bolivia

Highest point
- Elevation: 5,000 m (16,000 ft)
- Coordinates: 17°47′21″S 69°09′13″W

Geography
- Location: Bolivia, La Paz Department, Pacajes Province
- Parent range: Andes

Ch'iyara Salla (Aymara ch'iyara black, salla rocks, cliffs, "black cliff", also spelled Chiarasalla) is a 5,000-metre-high (16,404 ft) mountain in the Andes of Bolivia. It is situated in the La Paz Department, Pacajes Province, Charaña Municipality. It lies south-west of the mountain Kunturiri and west of K'illima Parki.
