= Pukara (Pacajes) =

Mountain in Bolivia

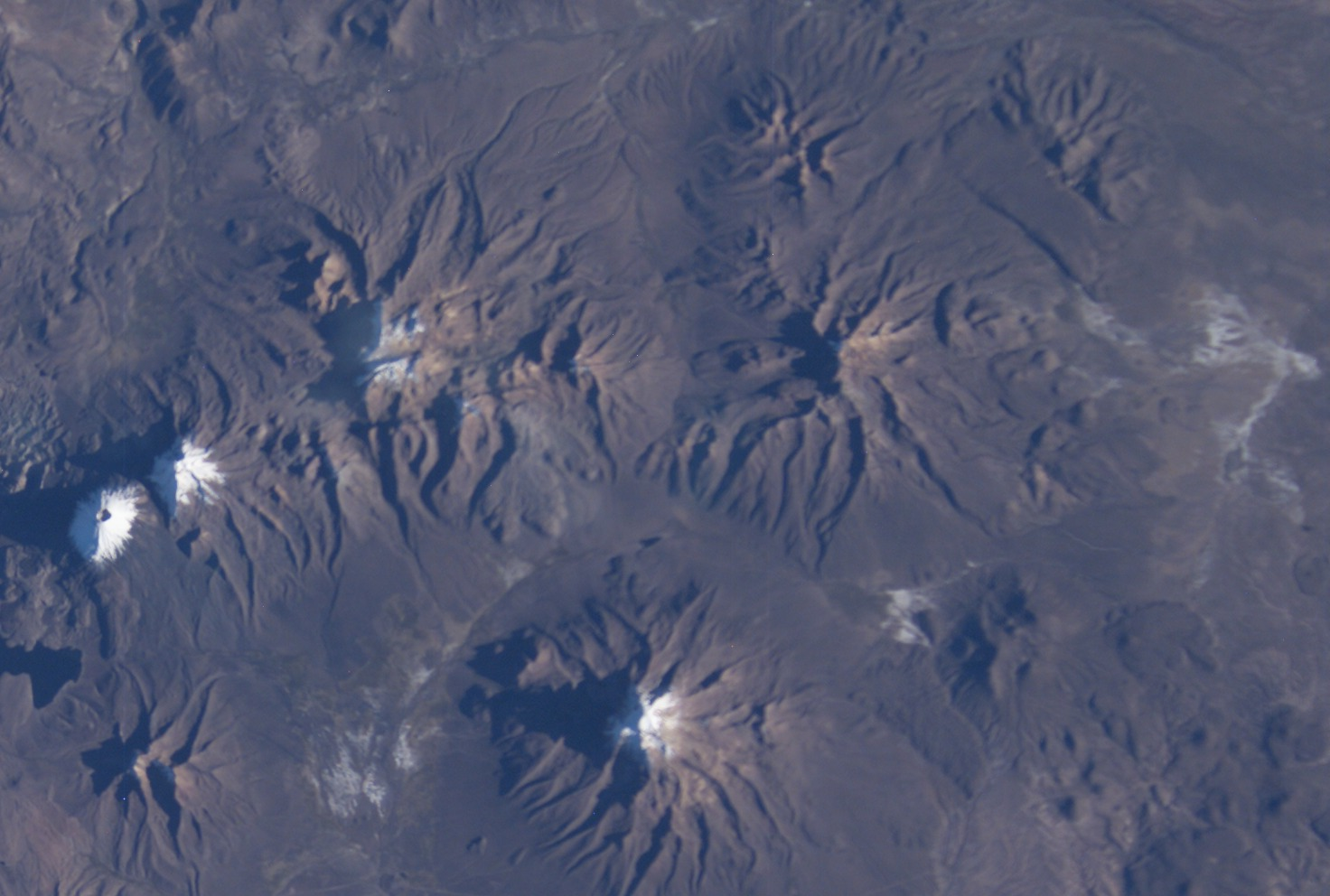
- Pukara is visible in the upper right part of this satellite image. Sajama volcano is shown in the lower center.

Highest point
- Elevation: 4,266 m (13,996 ft)
- Coordinates: 17°47′40″S 68°55′36″W

Geography
- Location within Bolivia
- Location: Bolivia, La Paz Department, Pacajes Province
- Parent range: Andes

Pukara (Aymara for fortress, Hispanicized spelling Pucara) is a 4,266-metre-high (13,996 ft) mountain in the Andes of Bolivia. It is located in the La Paz Department, Pacajes Province, Calacoto Municipality. Pukara lies north of the Anallajsi volcano, north-west of the mountain Pichaqa and south-west of the mountains Urqipi and Churi Willk'i. It is situated at the Jalsuri River, a right affluent of the Achuta River. The village of Pukara (Pucara) lies at its feet, south-east of it.
