= Wawanaki =

Mountain in Bolivia

- Location within Bolivia

Highest point
- Elevation: 5,100 m (16,700 ft)
- Coordinates: 16°09′54″S 68°18′01″W

Geography
- Location: Bolivia, La Paz Department, Los Andes Province, Pucarani
- Parent range: Andes, Cordillera Real

Wawanaki (Aymara), also spelled Wawanaqui) is a mountain in the Cordillera Real in the Andes of Bolivia, about 5,100 metres (16,732 ft) high. It is located in the La Paz Department, Los Andes Province, Pucarani Municipality. Wawanaki is situated west of the main peak of the Kunturiri massif, northeast of Nasa Q'ara and east of Ch'iyar K'ark'a. It lies south of the lake Allqa Quta.
