= Laram Quta =

Laram Quta or Larama Quta (Aymara larama blue quta lake, "blue lake", also spelled Laram Khota, Laram Kkota, Laramcota, Laramkkota and Laramacota) may refer to:

- Laram Quta (El Alto), a lake in the El Alto Municipality, Pedro Domingo Murillo Province, La Paz Department, Bolivia
- Laram Quta (Inquisivi), a lake in the Quime Municipality, Inquisivi Province, La Paz Department, Bolivia
- Laram Quta (La Paz), a lake in the La Paz Municipality, Pedro Domingo Murillo Province, La Paz Department, Bolivia
- Laram Quta (Los Andes), a lake in the Pucarani Municipality, Los Andes Province, La Paz Department, Bolivia
- Laram Quta (Sud Yungas), a lake in the Sud Yungas Province, La Paz Department, Bolivia
- Larama Quta, a mountain in Peru
