= Jach'a Jawira (Calacoto) =

- Etymology: Aymara

Location
- Country: Bolivia
- Region: La Paz Department, Pacajes Province

Physical characteristics
- Source
  - location: Calacoto Municipality

Basin features
- Tributaries
  - left: Nasa Q'ara, Waña Jawira, Jach'a Q'awa, Q'uwa Jawira
  - right: Wisk'achani, Qillqani, Urqu Jawira

Jach'a Jawira (Aymara jach'a big, jawira river, "big river", also spelled Jachcha Jahuira) which upstream is called Anallajchi and Sura K'uchu and downstream successively is named Qincha Jawira and Achuta is a Bolivian river in the La Paz Department, Pacajes Province, Calacoto Municipality. It is a right tributary of the Achuta River (later named Río Blanco) which originates near the Chilean border and flows northeast to reach the Mauri River.

Jach'a Jawira originates west of the mountain Anallajchi as an intermittent stream named Anallajchi. Shortly afterwards it is called Sura K'uchu. It flows to the northeast. After getting waters from another intermittent stream named Pujalsu it receives the name Jach'a Jawira. Now its direction is to the east until Urqu Jawira, its most important affluent from the right, joins the river. From now on the river flows to the north where it is called Qincha Jawira ("totora mat river", Khencha Jahuira). Before its confluence with the Achuta River from the southwest it changes its name to Achuta. The confluence is northeast of Q'ara Qullu (Caracollo).
