= K'illima Parki =

Mountain in Bolivia

- Location within Bolivia

Highest point
- Elevation: 4,979 m (16,335 ft)
- Coordinates: 17°47′25″S 69°05′24″W

Geography
- Location: Bolivia, La Paz Department, Pacajes Province
- Parent range: Andes

K'illima Parki (Aymara k'illima, k'illimi coal, parki slope, "coal slope", also spelled Killima Parqui) is a 4,979-metre-high (16,335 ft) mountain in the Andes of Bolivia. It is situated in the La Paz Department, Pacajes Province, Charaña Municipality. It lies south-west of the mountain Kunturiri. The peak south-west of K'illima Parki is named Wari Willk'i ("vicuña gap", Huariwillkhi).

== See also ==
- Wayra Lupi Qullu
