= Laram Q'awa =

Laram Q'awa (Aymara larama blue, q'awa little river, ditch, crevice, fissure, gap in the earth, "blue brook" or "blue ravine", also spelled Laram Khaua, Laramkahua, Laramkhaua, Larancagua, Larancahua) may refer to:

- Laram Q'awa (Charaña), a mountain in the Charaña Municipality, Pacajes Province, La Paz Department, Bolivia
- Laram Q'awa (Pando), a mountain in the José Manuel Pando Province, La Paz Department, Bolivia
- Laram Q'awa (Parinacota), a mountain in the Parinacota Province, Arica y Parinacota Region, Chile
- Laram Q'awa (Río Blanco), a mountain near Río Blanco in the Charaña Municipality, Pacajes Province, La Paz Department, Bolivia
