= Churi Willk'i =

Mountain in Bolivia

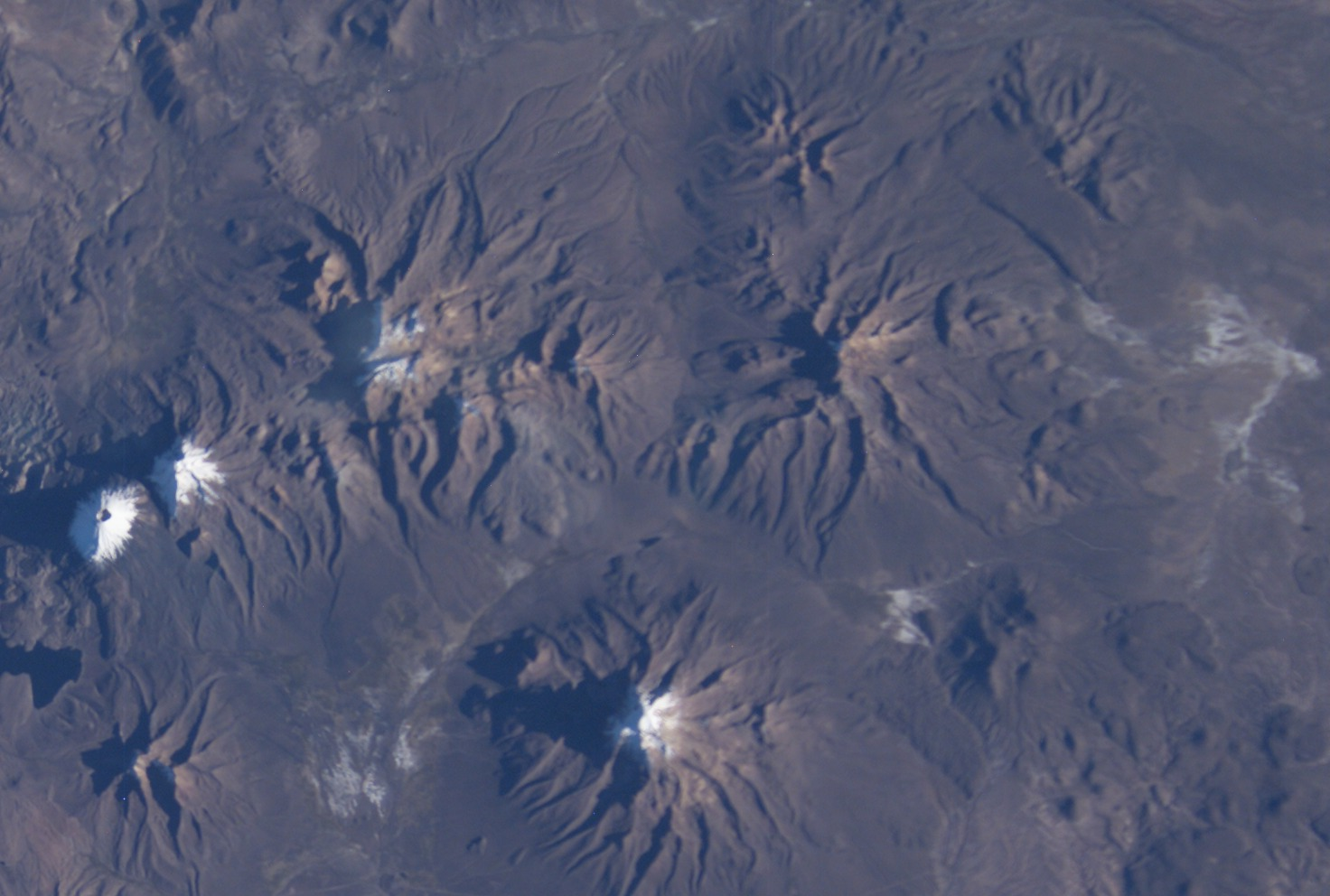
- Churi Willk'i is visible in the upper right part of this satellite image. Sajama volcano is shown in the lower center.

Highest point
- Elevation: 4,256 m (13,963 ft)
- Coordinates: 17°46′54″S 68°55′14″W

Geography
- Location within Bolivia
- Location: Bolivia, La Paz Department, Pacajes Province
- Parent range: Andes

Churi Willk'i (Aymara churi dull yellow, willk'i gap "dull yellow gap", also spelled Churi Willkhi) is a 4,256-metre-high (13,963 ft) mountain in the Andes of Bolivia. It is located in the La Paz Department, Pacajes Province, Calacoto Municipality. Pukara lies north of the Anallajsi volcano, south of the mountain Urqipi and north-east of the mountain Pukara.
