= Kelani =

Kelani may refer to:

- Q'ilani, a mountain in Bolivia's Pacajes Province
- Q'ilani (Ingavi-Los Andes), a mountain in Bolivia's Ingavi and Los Andes provinces
- Kehlani, an American singer
