= Jist'aña =

Mountain in Bolivia

- Pirámide Blanca
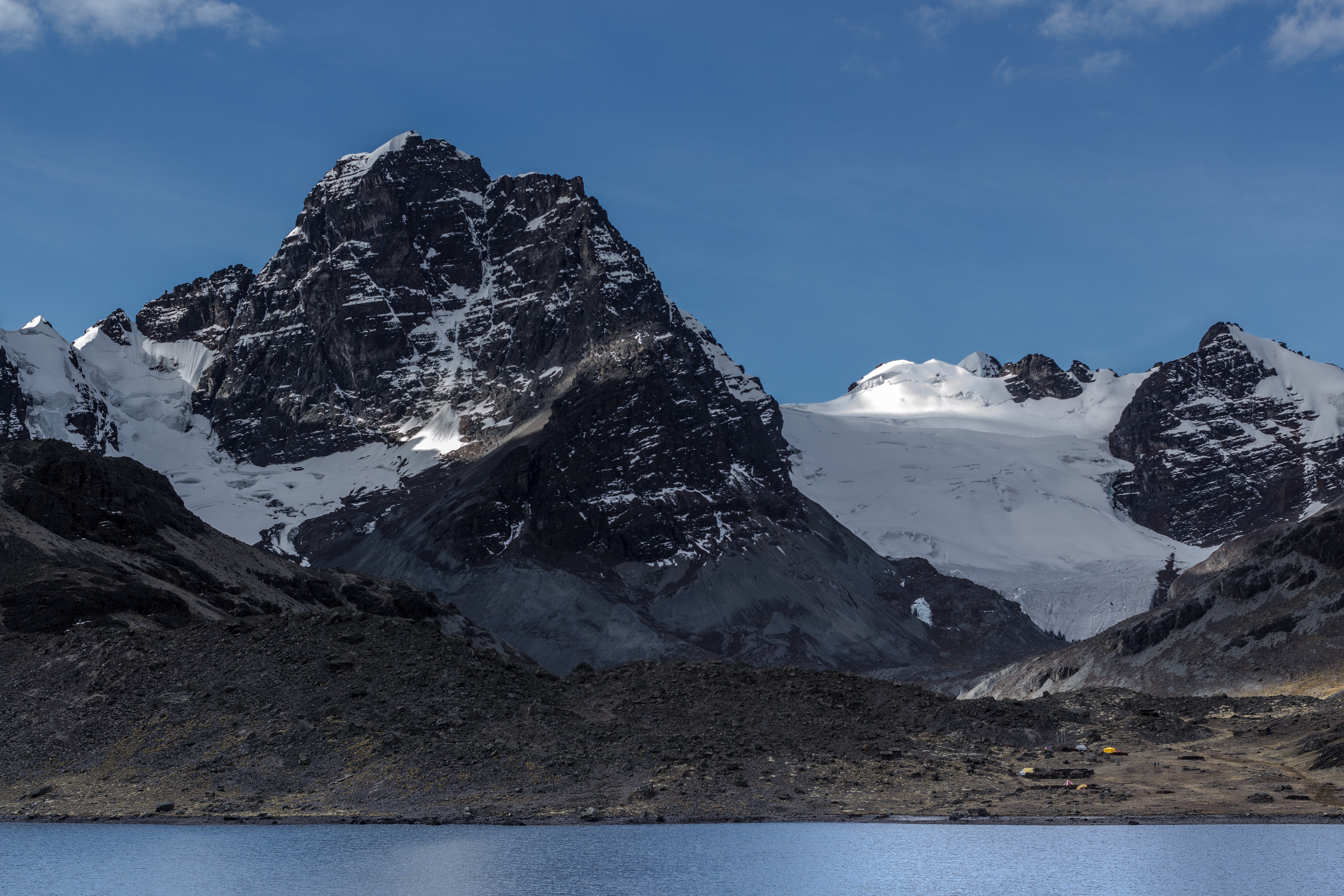
- Jist'aña (on the right) as seen from Ch'iyar Quta

Highest point
- Elevation: 5,260 m (17,260 ft)
- Coordinates: 16°10′38″S 68°13′00″W

Geography
- Location within Bolivia
- Location: Bolivia; La Paz Department
- Parent range: Andes, Cordillera Real

Climbing
- First ascent: 1964

Jist'aña (Aymara for to close and for to carry bulky packages, also spelled Jisthana), also known as Pirámide Blanca (Spanish for "white piramid"), is a mountain in the Cordillera Real in the Bolivian Andes, about 5,260 metres (17,260 ft) high. It is situated in the La Paz Department, at the border of the Los Andes Province, Pucarani Municipality, and the Murillo Province, La Paz Municipality. Jist'aña lies between the mountain Kunturiri of the La Paz Municipality in the southeast and the peaks of Kunturiri of the Los Andes Province in the northwest. The rivers Kunturiri (Condoriri) and Jist'aña Jawira (Jistano Jahuira) originate near the mountain. Kunturiri River flows to Ch'iyar Quta, a lake southwest of Jist'aña, and Jist'aña Jawira which later is named Uma Pallqa (Uma Palca) flows to the northeast.

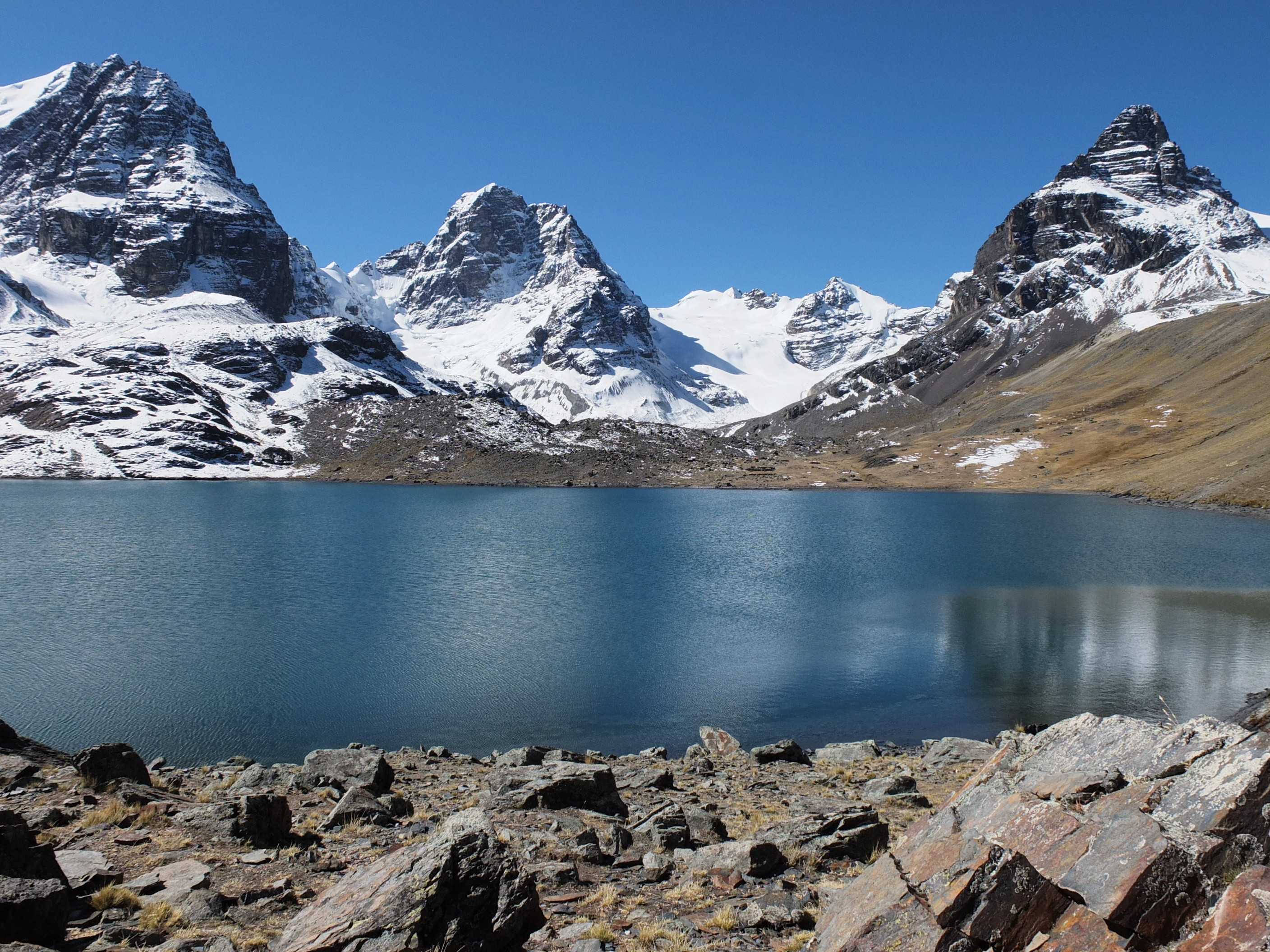
A view of Ch'iyar Quta, the base camp and the group southeast of the main peak of Kunturiri showing Jist'aña in the background.
