= Chuwa Chuwani =

Mountain in Bolivia

- Location within Bolivia

Highest point
- Elevation: 4,918 m (16,135 ft)
- Coordinates: 17°57′08″S 68°56′22″W

Geography
- Location: Bolivia, La Paz Department
- Parent range: Andes

Chuwa Chuwani (Aymara chuwa chuwa little herb which grows in swamps, -ni a suffix to indicate ownership, "the one with the chuwa chuwa plant", Hispanicized spelling Chua Chuani) is a 4,918-metre-high (16,135 ft) mountain in the Andes of Bolivia. It is situated in the La Paz Department, Pacajes Province, in the south of the Calacoto Municipality. Chuwa Chuwani lies between the mountain Anallaxchi in the north-east and Jach'a Kunturiri in the south-west.
