= Janq'u Apachita =

Mountain in Bolivia

- Location within Bolivia

Highest point
- Elevation: 4,570 m (14,990 ft)
- Coordinates: 17°06′11″S 68°15′58″W

Geography
- Location: Bolivia, La Paz Department; Pacajes Province
- Parent range: Andes, Chilla-Kimsa Chata

Janq'u Apachita (Aymara janq'u white, apachita the place of transit of an important pass in the principal routes of the Andes; name in the Andes for a stone cairn, a little pile of rocks built along the trail in the high mountains, also spelled Janko Apacheta, Jankho Apacheta) is a 4,570-metre-high (14,990 ft) mountain in the southern part of the Chilla-Kimsa Chata mountain range in the Andes of Bolivia. It is located in the La Paz Department, Pacajes Province, Waldo Ballivián Municipality. Janq'u Apachita lies northeast of Wila Qullu.
