= Nazacara de Pacajes =

Nazacara de Pacajes Nasa Q'ara
- Town
- Location within Bolivia
- Coordinates: 16°56′S 68°46′W
- Country: Bolivia
- Department: La Paz Department
- Province: Pacajes Province
- Municipality: Nazacara de Pacajes Municipality

Population (2001)
  - Total: 198
- Time zone: UTC-4 (BOT)

Nazacara (hispanicized spelling) or Nasa Q'ara (Aymara nasa nose, q'ara bare, bald) is a village in the La Paz Department in Bolivia. It is the seat of the Nazacara de Pacajes Municipality, the seventh municipal section of the Pacajes Province.
