= Pucarani Municipality =

Pucarani Pukarani
- Municipality
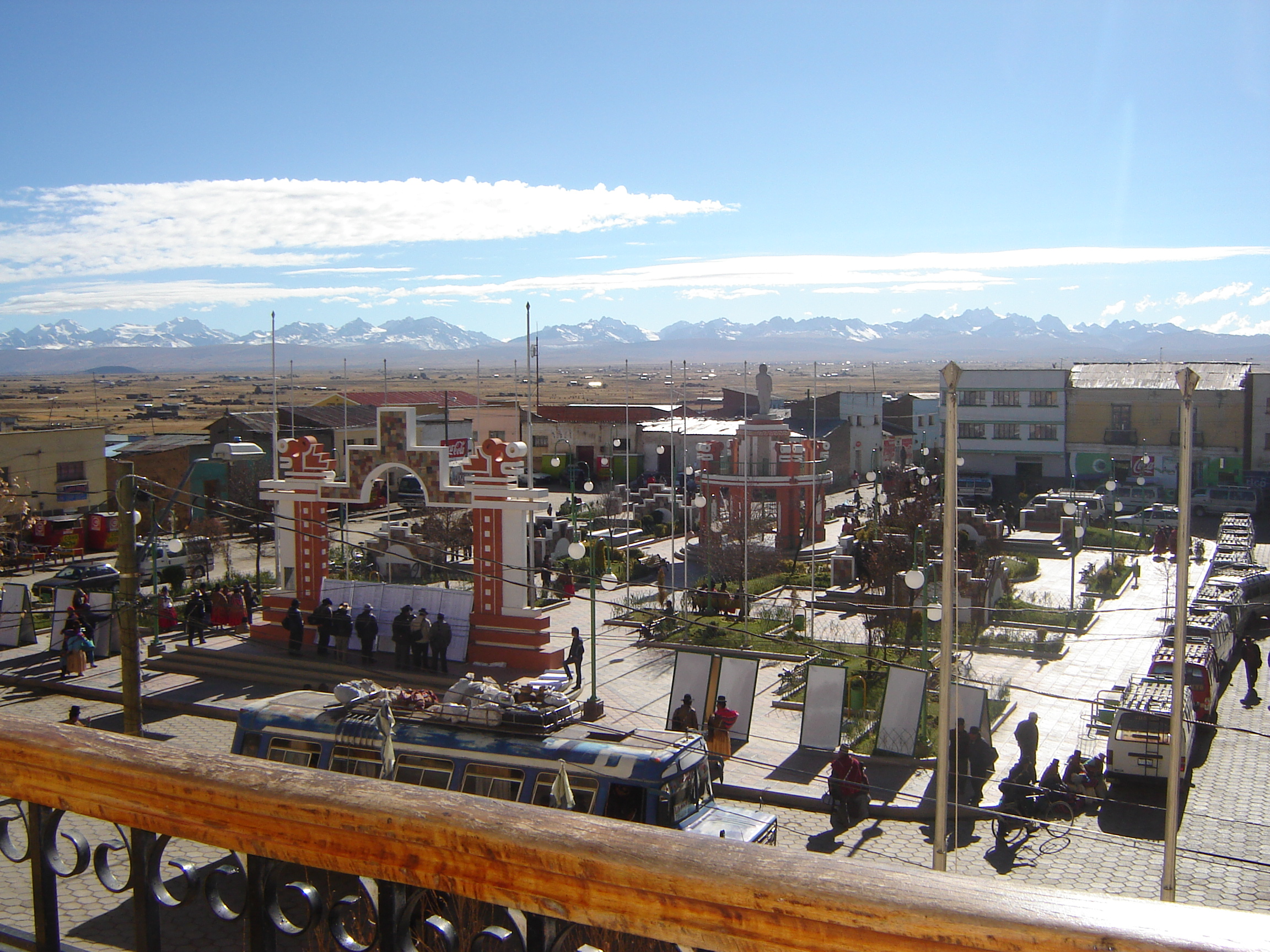
- Pucarani

- Location within Bolivia
- Coordinates: 16°20′S 68°25′W
- Country: Bolivia
- Department: La Paz Department
- Province: Los Andes Province
- Seat: Pucarani

Population (2001)
  - Total: 26,802
  - Ethnicities: Aymara
- Time zone: UTC-4 (BOT)

Pucarani Municipality is the first municipal section of the Los Andes Province in the La Paz Department, Bolivia. Its seat is Pucarani.

It is bordered to the north by the Batallas Municipality, to the east by the Pedro Domingo Murillo Province, to the south by the Laja Municipality and to the west by the Ingavi Province and Lake Titicaca.

== Geography ==
The Cordillera Real traverses the Pucarani Municipality. One of the highest peaks of the municipality is Kunturiri. Other mountains are listed below:

- Ch'iyar Qullu
- Imasiña
- Imilla Apachita
- Jach'a Jipiña
- Jist'aña
- Nasa Q'ara
- Nasa Q'ara (Wawanaki)
- Pura Purani T'uxu
- Qullpani
- Tira Qullu
- Wawanaki
- Wila Kunka Pata

== Division ==
The municipality consists of the following twelve cantons:

- Catavi Canton - 741 inhabitants (2001)
- Chojasivi Canton - 1,444 inhabitants
- Cohana Canton - 1,679 inhabitants
- Lacaya Canton - 2,067 inhabitants
- Patamanta Canton - 3,116 inhabitants
- Pucarani Canton - 5,325 inhabitants
- Villa Ascensión de Chipamaya Canton - 1,271 inhabitants
- Villa Iquiaca Canton - 1,555 inhabitants
- Villa Pabón Chiarpata Canton - 844 inhabitants
- Villa Rosario de Corapata Canton - 3,625 inhabitants
- Villa Vilaque Canton - 2,903 inhabitants
- Huayna Potosí Canton - 2,232 inhabitants

== See also ==
- Allqa Quta
- Ch'iyar Quta
- Juri Quta
- Katari River
- Laram Quta
- Sura Quta (Patamanta)
- Sura Quta (Wayna Potosí)
- Taypi Chaka Quta
