= Comanche Municipality =

- Municipality
- Location of the Comanche Municipality within Bolivia
- Coordinates: 17°00′0″S 68°25′0″W
- Country: Bolivia
- Department: La Paz Department
- Province: Pacajes Province
- Seat: Comanche

Government
  - Mayor: Juan Mamani Villca (2007)
  - President: Jorge Humerez Humerez (2007)

Area
  - Total: 170 sq mi (430 km^{2})
- Elevation: 13,000 ft (4,000 m)

Population (2001)
  - Total: 3,862
- Time zone: UTC-4 (BOT)

Comanche Municipality is the fourth municipal section of the Pacajes Province in the La Paz Department, Bolivia. Its seat is Comanche.
