= Qullpani =

Mountain in Bolivia

- Location within Bolivia

Highest point
- Elevation: 4,926 m (16,161 ft)
- Coordinates: 16°12′54″S 68°16′20″W

Geography
- Location: Bolivia, La Paz Department, Los Andes Province
- Parent range: Andes, Cordillera Real

Qullpani (Aymara qullpa saltpeter, -ni a suffix to indicate ownership, "the one with saltpeter", also spelled Kollpani) is a 4,926-metre-high (16,161 ft) mountain in the Cordillera Real in the Andes of Bolivia. It is located in the La Paz Department, Los Andes Province, Pucarani Municipality. Qullpani lies south of a lake named Juri Quta.

== See also ==
- Jach'a Jipiña
