= Ch'alla Jawira =

- Etymology: Aymara

Location
- Country: Bolivia
- Region: La Paz Department

Physical characteristics
- Source: Andes
  - location: Pacajes Province, Waldo Ballivián Municipality
  - coordinates: 17°07′50″S 68°16′57″W
- Mouth: Aqhuya Jawira
  - location: Aroma Province, Patacamaya Municipality
  - coordinates: 17°20′10″S 68°16′57″W

Basin features
- Tributaries
  - left: Wichhu Qullu River
  - right: Suni Jawira

The Ch'alla Jawira (Aymara ch'alla sand, jawira river, "sand river", also spelled Challa Jahuira, Challajahuira) which upstream is named Ch'api K'uchu and downstream successively is called Tupa Jawira and Qura Jawira is a river in the La Paz Department in Bolivia. It is a right affluent of the Aqhuya Jawira whose waters flow to the Desaguadero River.

Named Ch'api K'uchu ("thorn corner") the river originates in the southern part of the Chilla-Kimsa Chata mountain range from intermittent streams named Negro Amaya and Marco Soruco at 17°07′50″S 68°16′57″W south of Wila Qullu in the Pacajes Province, Waldo Ballivián Municipality. It has a south-eastern direction while it crosses the Coro Coro Municipality. The river flows along Janq'u Qalani where it receives the name Ch'alla Jawira. Near a mountain named Puki Tira it is named Tupa Jawira. Shortly before it receives waters from a left affluent named Wichhu Qullu it changes its name to Qura Jawira (Khora). Now Suni Jawira ("deserted river") which originates southwest of the source of Ch'alla Jawira and partly almost flows parallel to it joins the river as a right affluent. The confluence of the Ch'alla Jawira and the Aqhuya Jawira (Kheto) is south of Patacamaya (Patakamaya) in the Aroma Province, Patacamaya Municipality, at 17°20′10″S 67°54′30″W.
