= Nasa Q'ara (Wawanaki) =

Mountain in Bolivia

- Location within Bolivia

Highest point
- Elevation: 5,064 m (16,614 ft)
- Coordinates: 16°10′21″S 68°18′27″W

Geography
- Location: Bolivia, La Paz Department, Los Andes Province, Pucarani Municipality
- Parent range: Andes, Cordillera Real

Nasa Q'ara (Aymara nasa nose, q'ara bare, bald, also spelled Nazacara) is a 5,064-metre-high (16,614 ft) mountain in the Cordillera Real in the Andes of Bolivia. It is situated in the La Paz Department, Los Andes Province, Pucarani Municipality, southwest of the lake Allqa Quta. Nasa Q'ara lies southwest of the main peak of the Kunturiri massif and Wawanaki and southeast of Ch'iyar K'ark'a.
