= Jach'a Jipiña =

Mountain in Bolivia

- Location within Bolivia

Highest point
- Elevation: 4,950 m (16,240 ft)
- Coordinates: 16°11′55″S 68°17′21″W

Geography
- Location: Bolivia, La Paz Department, Los Andes Province, Pucarani
- Parent range: Andes, Cordillera Real

Jach'a Jipiña (Aymara jach'a big, jipiña squatting of animals, 'big place where the animals crouch' or 'big resting place of animals', Hispanicized spelling Jachcha Jipina) is a 4,950-metre-high (16,240 ft) mountain in the Cordillera Real in the Andes of Bolivia. It is situated in the La Paz Department, Los Andes Province, Pucarani Municipality. Jach'a Jipiña lies south-west of the lake Juri Quta.

== See also ==
- Qullpani
