= Charaña Municipality =

- Municipality
- Flag

- Location of the Charaña Municipality within Bolivia
- Coordinates: 17°35′0″S 69°10′0″W
- Country: Bolivia
- Department: La Paz Department
- Province: Pacajes Province
- Seat: Charaña

Government
  - Mayor: Victor Hugo Apaza Mamani (2007)
  - President: Eufracio Marca Cruz (2007)

Area
  - Total: 1,110 sq mi (2,876 km^{2})
- Elevation: 13,500 ft (4,100 m)

Population (2001)
  - Total: 2,766
- Time zone: UTC-4 (BOT)

Charaña Municipality is the fifth municipal section of the Pacajes Province in the La Paz Department, Bolivia. Its seat is Charaña.

== Geography ==
Some of the highest mountains of the municipality are listed below:

- Ch'iyara Salla
- Jach'a Kunturiri
- Kunturiri
- K'illima Parki
- Laram Q'awa (Charaña)
- Laram Q'awa (Río Blanco)
- Phaq'u Q'awa
- Tatitu Qullu
- Wayra Lupi Qullu

== Climate ==
The climate in Charaña is characterized by a sub-freezing mean annual temperature, with large annual temperature ranges, and moderately low precipitation. The Köppen Climate System classifies this as a Tundra climate, abbreviated as ET.

Climate data for Charaña_Municipality
Month	Jan	Feb	Mar	Apr	May	Jun	Jul	Aug	Sep	Oct	Nov	Dec	Year
Mean daily maximum °C (°F)	17 (63)	17 (62)	17 (62)	18 (64)	17 (62)	14 (58)	14 (58)	16 (60)	16 (61)	17 (63)	19 (66)	18 (64)	17 (62)
Daily mean °C (°F)	7 (45)	7 (45)	7 (45)	5 (41)	3 (37)	0 (32)	1 (34)	2 (36)	4 (39)	5 (41)	6 (43)	7 (45)	5 (40)
Mean daily minimum °C (°F)	−2 (28)	−1 (30)	−3 (27)	−6 (21)	−9 (15)	−13 (8)	−13 (9)	−12 (11)	−8 (17)	−7 (20)	−6 (22)	−3 (27)	−7 (20)
Average precipitation mm (inches)	48 (1.9)	53 (2.1)	38 (1.5)	5.1 (0.2)	0 (0)	2.5 (0.1)	5.1 (0.2)	2.5 (0.1)	2.5 (0.1)	15 (0.6)	10 (0.4)	41 (1.6)	220 (8.7)
Source: Weatherbase
