= Pacajes Province =

Pacajes
- Province
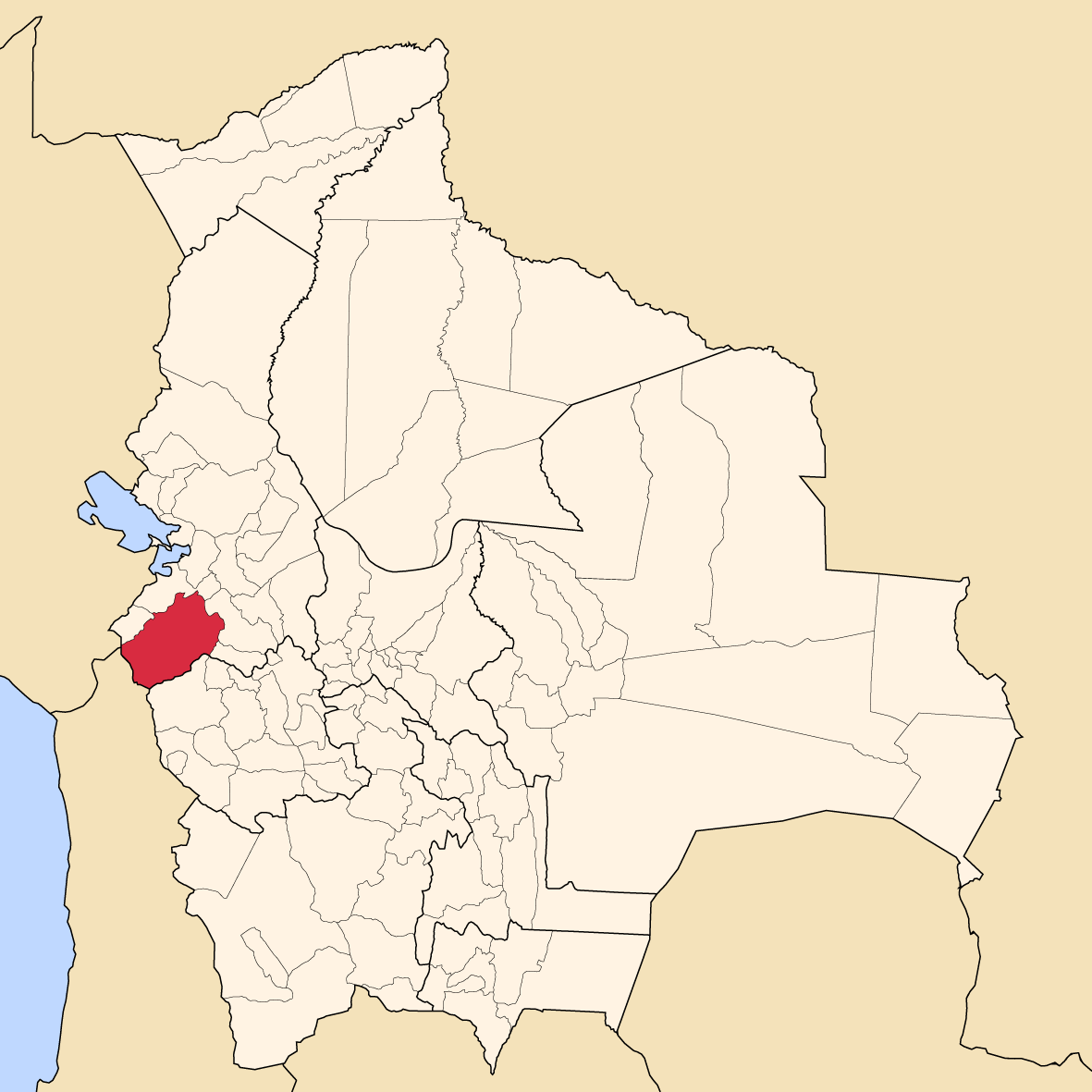
- Location of Pacajes Province within Bolivia

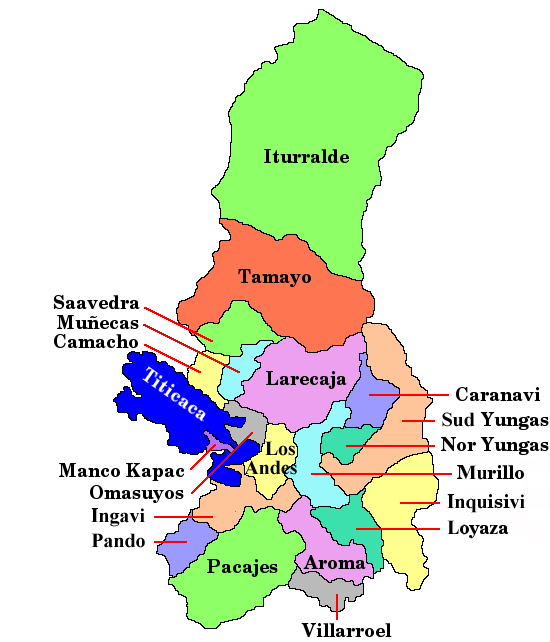
- Provinces of the La Paz Department
- Coordinates: 17°30′0″S 68°45′0″W
- Country: Bolivia
- Department: La Paz Department
- Municipalities: 8
- Capital: Corocoro

Area
  - Total: 10,584 km^{2} (4,087 sq mi)

Population (2024 census)
  - Total: 68,753
  - Density: 6.4959/km^{2} (16.824/sq mi)
- Time zone: UTC-4 (BOT)

Pacajes is a province in the Bolivian department of La Paz. Its capital is Coro Coro.

== Geography ==
Some of the highest mountains of the province are listed below:

- Chinchillani
- Ch'iyara Salla
- Chuqi Nasa
- Churi Willk'i
- Chuwa Chuwani
- Ch'uxña Quta
- Jach'a Kunturiri
- Jach'a Phasa
- Janq'u Apachita
- Janq'u Qalani
- Jaqhi Chata
- Kimsa Qullu
- Kunturiri
- K'illima Parki
- Laram Q'awa (Charaña)
- Laram Q'awa (Río Blanco)
- Llallawa
- Muxsa Willk'i
- Nasani
- Pä Q'awa
- Phaq'u Q'awa
- Pichaqa
- Pukara
- Q'awiri Qullu
- Q'ilani
- Suni Q'awa
- Tatitu Qullu
- Urqipi
- Utani Apu
- Wallatiri
- Wayra Lupi Qullu
- Wila Qullu

The most important river of the province is the Desaguadero River. Other rivers in the province are Ch'alla Jawira (in Aroma and Pacajes), Ch'alla Jawira (in Callapa), Jach'a Jawira (in Calacoto), Jach'a Jawira (in Caquiaviri), Llallawa Jawira, Qala Jawira, Qullpa Jawira and Thujsa Jawira.

== Subdivision ==
The province is divided into eight municipalities which are further subdivided into cantons.

Section	Municipality	Seat
1st	Coro Coro Municipality	Coro Coro
2nd	Caquiaviri Municipality	Caquiaviri
3rd	Calacoto Municipality	Calacoto
4th	Comanche Municipality	Comanche
5th	Charaña Municipality	Charaña
6th	Waldo Ballivián Municipality	Tumarapi (or Waldo Ballivián)
7th	Nazacara de Pacajes Municipality	Nazacara
8th	Santiago de Callapa Municipality	Callapa
