= Tumarapi =

- Town
- Location within Bolivia
- Coordinates: 17°04′S 68°11′W
- Country: Bolivia
- Department: La Paz Department
- Province: Pacajes Province
- Municipality: Waldo Ballivián Municipality

Population (2001)
  - Total: 436
- Time zone: UTC-4 (BOT)

Tumarapi is a location in the La Paz Department in Bolivia. It is the seat of the Waldo Ballivián Municipality, the sixth municipal section of the Pacajes Province.
