= Coro Coro Municipality =

- Municipality
- Flag

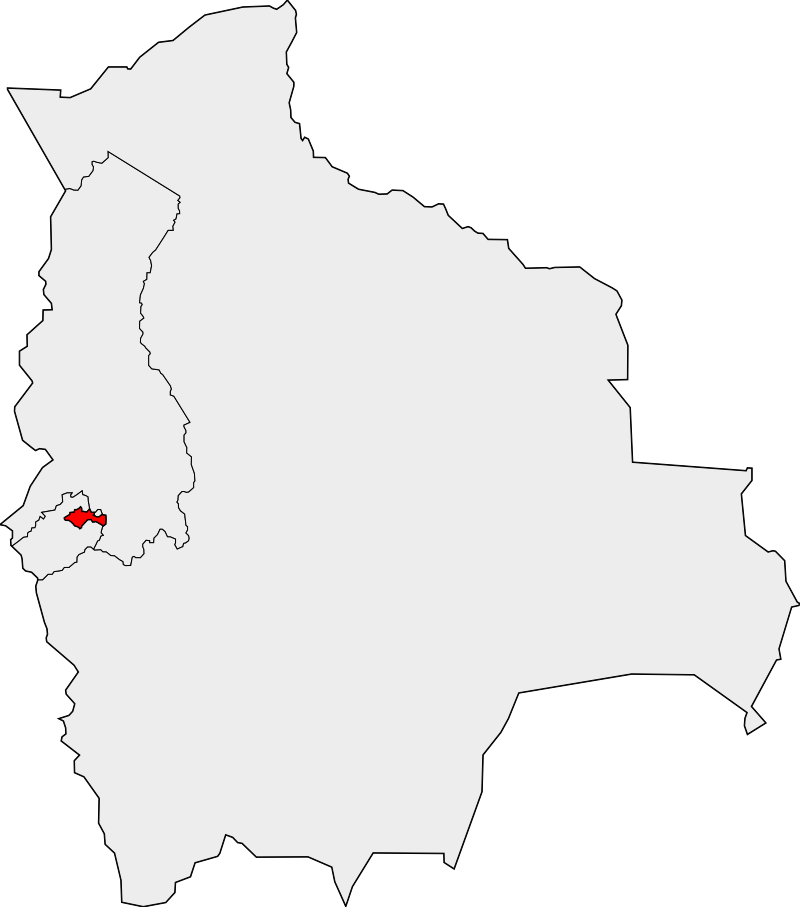
- Location of the Coro Coro Municipality within Bolivia
- Coordinates: 17°10′0″S 68°25′0″W
- Country: Bolivia
- Department: La Paz Department
- Province: Pacajes Province
- Seat: Coro Coro

Government
  - Mayor: Simeon Paredes Salluco (2007)
  - President: Brito Choque Mollo (2007)

Area
  - Total: 421 sq mi (1,091 km^{2})
- Elevation: 13,000 ft (4,000 m)

Population (2012)
  - Total: 10,647
- Time zone: UTC-4 (BOT)

Coro Coro Municipality is the first municipal section of the Pacajes Province in the La Paz Department, Bolivia. Its seat is Coro Coro.

== See also ==
- Ch'alla Jawira
- Janq'u Qalani
- Muxsa Willk'i
- Q'ilani
