= Calacoto Municipality =

Calacoto Qala Qutu
- Municipality
- Location of the Calacoto Municipality within Bolivia
- Coordinates: 17°25′0″S 68°45′0″W
- Country: Bolivia
- Department: La Paz Department
- Province: Pacajes Province
- Seat: Calacoto

Government
  - Mayor: Jorge Pari Apaza (2007)
  - President: Rosendo Jaillita Alcon (2007)

Area
  - Total: 1,504 sq mi (3,896 km^{2})
- Elevation: 12,800 ft (3,900 m)

Population (2001)
  - Total: 8,818
- Time zone: UTC-4 (BOT)

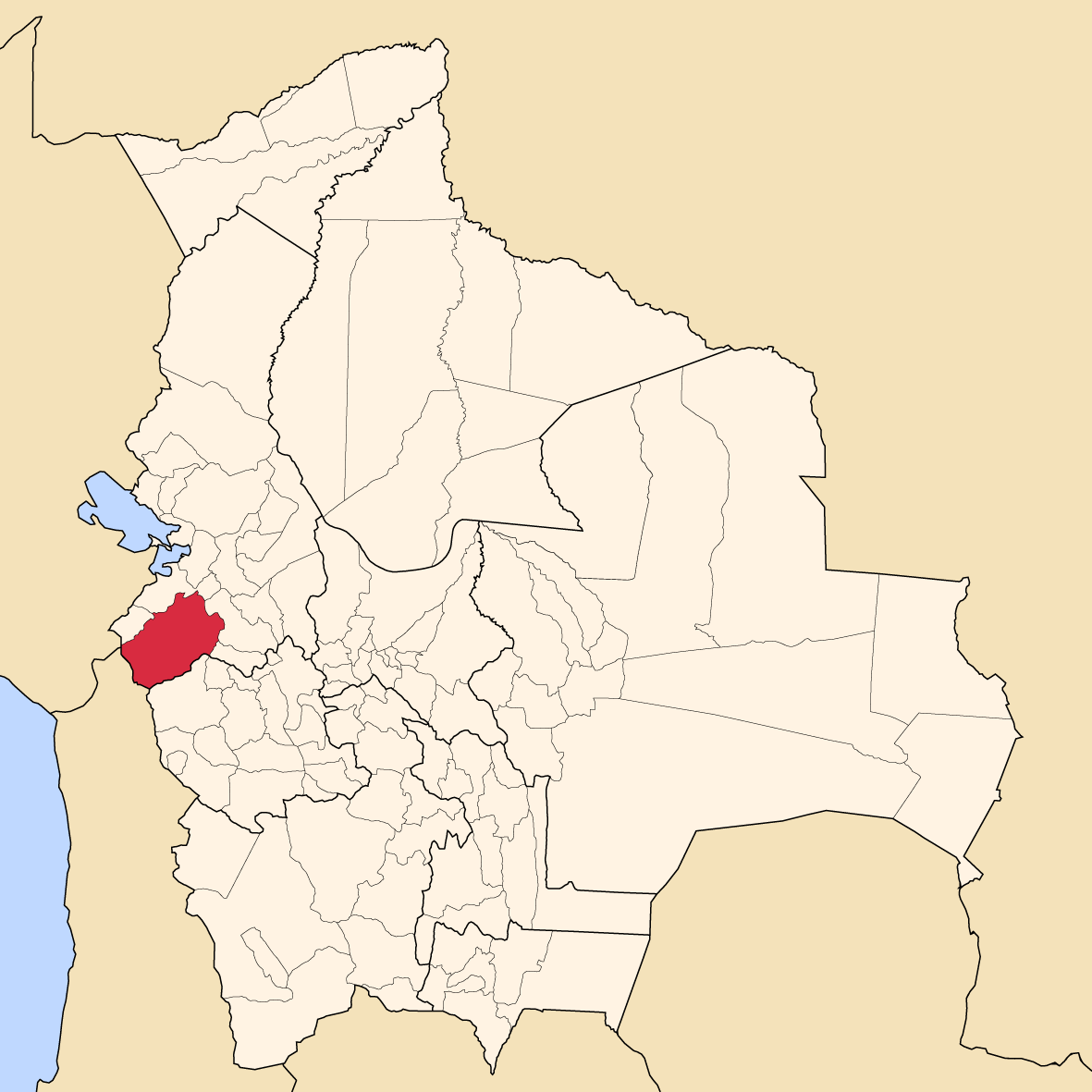
Map of Bolivia showing Pacajes province, La Paz

Calacoto or Qala Qutu (Aymara qala stone, qutu heap, pile, "stone pile") is the third municipal section of the Pacajes Province in the La Paz Department, Bolivia. Its seat is Calacoto (Qala Qutu).

== Geography ==
Some of the highest mountains of the municipality are listed below:

- Chinchillani
- Chuqi Nasa
- Churi Willk'i
- Chuwa Chuwani
- Ch'uxña Quta
- Jach'a Kunturiri
- Jaqhi Chata
- Kimsa Qullu
- Llallawa
- Nasani
- Pä Q'awa
- Pichaqa
- Pukara
- Suni Q'awa
- Urqipi
- Wallatiri

== Climate ==
Climate data for Calacoto, elevation 3,805 m (12,484 ft)
Month	Jan	Feb	Mar	Apr	May	Jun	Jul	Aug	Sep	Oct	Nov	Dec	Year
Mean daily maximum °C (°F)	17.4 (63.3)	17.9 (64.2)	17.7 (63.9)	17.9 (64.2)	17.0 (62.6)	15.4 (59.7)	15.5 (59.9)	16.6 (61.9)	17.9 (64.2)	19.5 (67.1)	20.1 (68.2)	19.3 (66.7)	17.7 (63.8)
Daily mean °C (°F)	10.6 (51.1)	10.5 (50.9)	10.2 (50.4)	8.3 (46.9)	5.2 (41.4)	3.2 (37.8)	2.8 (37.0)	4.5 (40.1)	6.6 (43.9)	8.8 (47.8)	10.2 (50.4)	10.8 (51.4)	7.6 (45.8)
Mean daily minimum °C (°F)	3.8 (38.8)	3.2 (37.8)	2.6 (36.7)	−1.4 (29.5)	−6.5 (20.3)	−9.1 (15.6)	−9.8 (14.4)	−7.6 (18.3)	−4.7 (23.5)	−1.8 (28.8)	0.3 (32.5)	2.2 (36.0)	−2.4 (27.7)
Average precipitation mm (inches)	107 (4.2)	77 (3.0)	51 (2.0)	17 (0.7)	3 (0.1)	3 (0.1)	1 (0.0)	7 (0.3)	9 (0.4)	13 (0.5)	28 (1.1)	61 (2.4)	377 (14.8)
Average relative humidity (%)	60	58	55	46	37	39	36	38	40	40	41	46	45
Source: Plataforma digital única del Estado Peruano

== See also ==
- Jach'a Jawira
- Jach'a Phasa
- Llallawa Jawira
