= Comanche, Bolivia =

- Town
- Location within Bolivia
- Coordinates: 16°57′S 68°26′W
- Country: Bolivia
- Department: La Paz Department
- Province: Pacajes Province
- Municipality: Comanche Municipality

Population (2001)
  - Total: 410
- Time zone: UTC-4 (BOT)

Comanche, Bolivia is a location in the La Paz Department in Bolivia. It is the seat of the Comanche Municipality, the fourth municipal section of the Pacajes Province.

== Climate ==
Climate data for Comanche, elevation 4,055 m (13,304 ft)
Month	Jan	Feb	Mar	Apr	May	Jun	Jul	Aug	Sep	Oct	Nov	Dec	Year
Mean daily maximum °C (°F)	16.1 (61.0)	15.8 (60.4)	16.8 (62.2)	17.9 (64.2)	18.1 (64.6)	16.8 (62.2)	16.3 (61.3)	17.0 (62.6)	17.6 (63.7)	18.3 (64.9)	18.6 (65.5)	17.4 (63.3)	17.2 (63.0)
Daily mean °C (°F)	9.4 (48.9)	9.3 (48.7)	9.1 (48.4)	8.2 (46.8)	6.3 (43.3)	4.2 (39.6)	3.9 (39.0)	5.2 (41.4)	7.0 (44.6)	8.5 (47.3)	9.6 (49.3)	9.6 (49.3)	7.5 (45.6)
Mean daily minimum °C (°F)	2.6 (36.7)	2.2 (36.0)	1.4 (34.5)	−1.8 (28.8)	−5.7 (21.7)	−8.2 (17.2)	−8.6 (16.5)	−6.4 (20.5)	−3.5 (25.7)	−1.6 (29.1)	0.6 (33.1)	1.7 (35.1)	−2.3 (27.9)
Average precipitation mm (inches)	135 (5.3)	103 (4.1)	74 (2.9)	30 (1.2)	6 (0.2)	5 (0.2)	5 (0.2)	9 (0.4)	26 (1.0)	24 (0.9)	46 (1.8)	83 (3.3)	546 (21.5)
Source: Plataforma digital única del Estado Peruano
