= Muxsa Willk'i =

Mountain in Bolivia

- Location within Bolivia

Highest point
- Elevation: 4,490 m (14,730 ft)
- Coordinates: 17°09′15″S 68°18′21″W

Geography
- Location: Bolivia, La Paz Department; Pacajes Province
- Parent range: Andes

Muxsa Willk'i (Aymara, muxsa sweet, willk'i gap, also spelled Mojsa Willkhi) is a 4,490-metre-high (14,730 ft) mountain in the Andes of Bolivia. It is located in the La Paz Department, Pacajes Province, Coro Coro Municipality. Muxsa Will'i lies southwest of Waylla Pukara and west of Achachi Qala.
