= Suni Q'awa =

Mountain in Bolivia

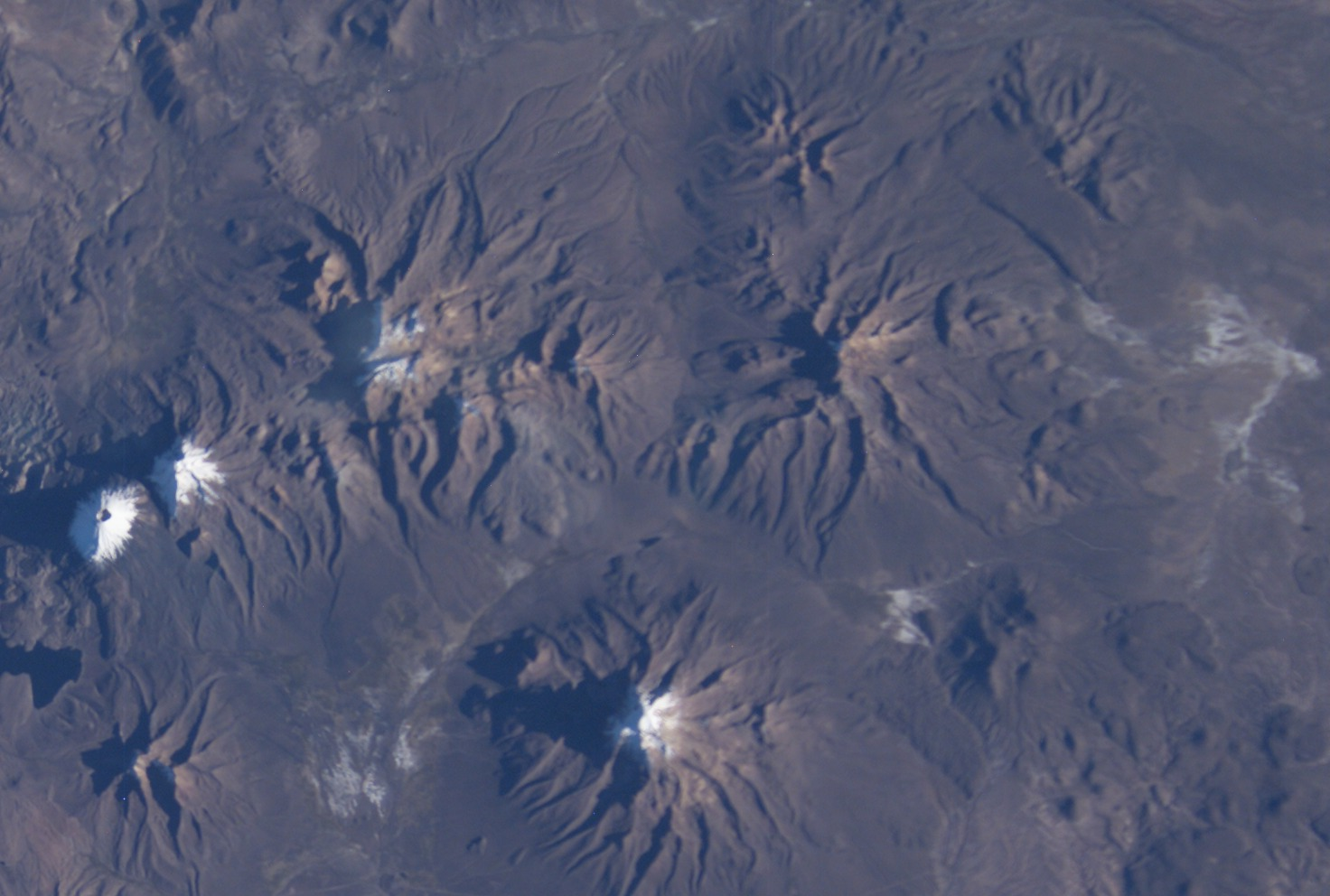
- Suni Q'awa is visible in the upper part of this satellite image (center, right). Sajama volcano is shown in the lower center.

Highest point
- Elevation: 5,018 m (16,463 ft)
- Coordinates: 17°51′49″S 68°58′12″W

Geography
- Location within Bolivia
- Location: Bolivia, La Paz Department, Pacajes Province
- Parent range: Andes

Suni Q'awa (Aymara suni unpopulated, deserted, q'awa little river, ditch, crevice, fissure, gap in the earth, riverbed, "unpopulated brook" or "unpopulated ravine", also spelled Soni Khaua) or Sani Q'awa (Aymara sani a variety of potatoes, "sani brook" or "sani ravine", also spelled Sani Khaua) is a 5,018-metre-high (16,463 ft) mountain in the Andes of Bolivia. It is located in the La Paz Department, Pacajes Province, in the south-west of the Calacoto Municipality. The mountain lies north-west of the Anallajsi volcano and north-east of the mountains Ch'uxña Quta and Chinchillani.
