= Nasa Q'ara =

Mountain in Bolivia

- Location within Bolivia

Highest point
- Elevation: 5,156 m (16,916 ft)
- Coordinates: 16°8′17″S 68°18′08″W

Geography
- Location: Bolivia, La Paz Department, Los Andes Province, Pucarani
- Parent range: Andes, Cordillera Real

Nasa Q'ara (Aymara nasa nose, q'ara bare, bald, also spelled Nasacara, Nasaq'ara) is a 5,156-metre-high (16,916 ft) mountain in the Cordillera Real in the Andes of Bolivia. It is located in the La Paz Department, Los Andes Province, Pucarani Municipality. Nasa Q'ara is situated south-west of the mountain Chiqapa and north-east of the mountain Ch'iyar K'ark'a. It lies north of the lake Allqa Quta and south of a small lake named Khunu Quta ("snow lake").

== See also ==
- Kunturiri
- Q'ara Quta
