= Waldo Ballivián Municipality =

- Municipality
- Location of the Waldo Ballivián Municipality within Bolivia
- Coordinates: 17°5′0″S 68°10′0″W
- Country: Bolivia
- Department: La Paz Department
- Province: Pacajes Province
- Seat: Tumarapi (or Waldo Ballivián)

Government
  - Mayor: Jovito Oruño Ortega (2007)
  - President: Walter Eusebio Ortega Mollo (2007)

Area
  - Total: 47 sq mi (122 km^{2})
- Elevation: 13,000 ft (4,000 m)

Population (2001)
  - Total: 1,657
- Time zone: UTC-4 (BOT)

Waldo Ballivián Municipality is the sixth municipal section of the Pacajes Province in the La Paz Department, Bolivia. Its seat is Tumarapi (or Waldo Ballivián).

== See also ==
- Ch'alla Jawira
- Janq'u Apachita
- Wila Qullu
