= Jach'a Kunturiri (La Paz) =

Mountain in Bolivia

- Location within Bolivia

Highest point
- Elevation: 4,629 m (15,187 ft)
- Coordinates: 17°21′32″S 69°07′35″W

Geography
- Location: Bolivia, La Paz Department; Pacajes Province
- Parent range: Andes

Jach'a Kunturiri (Aymara jach'a big, kunturi condor, -(i)ri a suffix, Hispanicized spelling Jacha Condoriri) is a 4,629-metre-high (15,187 ft) mountain in the Andes of Bolivia. It is situated in the La Paz Department, Pacajes Province, on the border of the Calacoto Municipality and the Charaña Municipality. Jach'a Kunturiri lies south-west of the mountains Jisk'a Kunturiri ("little Kunturiri", Jiska Condoriri) and Taypi Kunturiri ("central Kunturiri", Taipi Condoriri).
