= Santiago de Callapa Municipality =

- Municipality
- Location of the Santiago de Callapa Municipality within Bolivia
- Coordinates: 17°15′0″S 68°20′0″W
- Country: Bolivia
- Department: La Paz Department
- Province: Pacajes Province
- Seat: Callapa

Government
  - Mayor: Cristobal Ramos Navarro (2007)
  - President: Teodoro Gutiérrez Villca (2007)

Area
  - Total: 470 sq mi (1,218 km^{2})
- Elevation: 12,500 ft (3,800 m)

Population (2001)
  - Total: 8,099
- Time zone: UTC-4 (BOT)

Santiago de Callapa Municipality or Callapa Municipality is the eighth municipal section of the Pacajes Province in the La Paz Department, Bolivia. Its seat is Callapa.

== See also ==
- Ch'alla Jawira
- Llallawa Jawira
