= Wallatiri (La Paz) =

Mountain in Bolivia

- Location within Bolivia

Highest point
- Elevation: 4,000 m (13,000 ft)
- Coordinates: 17°26′13″S 68°50′29″W

Geography
- Location: Bolivia, La Paz Department
- Parent range: Andes

Wallatiri (Aymara wallata snow ball, snow lump; Andean goose, -(i)ri a suffix, translated as "abundance of Andean geese" or "habitat of the Andean geese", Hispanicized spelling Huallatiri) is a mountain in the Andes of Bolivia, about 4,000 m (13,000 ft) high. It is located in the La Paz Department, Pacajes Province, Calacoto Municipality.
