= Charaña =

- Town
- Location within Bolivia
- Coordinates: 17°35′31″S 69°26′44″W
- Country: Bolivia
- Department: La Paz Department
- Province: Pacajes Province
- Municipality: Charaña Municipality
- Elevation: 13,310 ft (4,060 m)

Population (2001)
  - Total: 817
- Time zone: UTC-4 (BOT)

Charaña is a high elevation town in the altiplano of the La Paz Department in Bolivia. It is the seat of the Charaña Municipality, the fifth municipal section of the Pacajes Province.

Charaña is 2 kilometres (1.2 mi) east of the border with Chile.

== History ==
Charaña was the scene of the famous meeting between President Augusto Pinochet of Chile and Hugo Banzer on 8 February 1975 when they signed a Joint Declaration (Charaña Act), which restored diplomatic relations between the two countries which were broken since April 1962.

== Climate ==
Climate data for Charaña, elevation 4,057 m (13,310 ft)
Month	Jan	Feb	Mar	Apr	May	Jun	Jul	Aug	Sep	Oct	Nov	Dec	Year
Record high °C (°F)	26.3 (79.3)	25.2 (77.4)	25.0 (77.0)	25.0 (77.0)	22.2 (72.0)	21.4 (70.5)	22.0 (71.6)	23.0 (73.4)	23.2 (73.8)	24.8 (76.6)	25.4 (77.7)	29.7 (85.5)	29.7 (85.5)
Mean daily maximum °C (°F)	18.5 (65.3)	18.4 (65.1)	18.6 (65.5)	18.4 (65.1)	16.7 (62.1)	15.0 (59.0)	15.0 (59.0)	16.0 (60.8)	17.3 (63.1)	19.2 (66.6)	20.2 (68.4)	20.1 (68.2)	17.8 (64.0)
Daily mean °C (°F)	9.6 (49.3)	9.4 (48.9)	9.0 (48.2)	7.2 (45.0)	4.3 (39.7)	2.1 (35.8)	1.9 (35.4)	3.1 (37.6)	5.0 (41.0)	6.8 (44.2)	8.3 (46.9)	9.3 (48.7)	6.3 (43.4)
Mean daily minimum °C (°F)	0.2 (32.4)	0.2 (32.4)	−0.8 (30.6)	−4.4 (24.1)	−8.3 (17.1)	−11.0 (12.2)	−11.5 (11.3)	−10.0 (14.0)	−7.5 (18.5)	−5.6 (21.9)	−3.7 (25.3)	−1.6 (29.1)	−5.3 (22.4)
Record low °C (°F)	−19.0 (−2.2)	−13.6 (7.5)	−14.2 (6.4)	−17.8 (0.0)	−21.2 (−6.2)	−23.8 (−10.8)	−23.0 (−9.4)	−23.5 (−10.3)	−23.0 (−9.4)	−18.0 (−0.4)	−20.8 (−5.4)	−17.4 (0.7)	−23.8 (−10.8)
Average precipitation mm (inches)	89.3 (3.52)	68.5 (2.70)	52.7 (2.07)	10.2 (0.40)	1.8 (0.07)	2.4 (0.09)	1.7 (0.07)	4.9 (0.19)	2.8 (0.11)	6.4 (0.25)	14.6 (0.57)	40.5 (1.59)	295.8 (11.63)
Average precipitation days	14.1	12.0	9.9	2.6	0.7	0.5	0.4	0.8	1.1	1.9	3.1	7.4	54.5
Average relative humidity (%)	49.0	54.3	52.9	42.1	39.7	35.7	35.0	34.3	36.0	36.3	35.1	40.3	40.9
Source: Servicio Nacional de Meteorología e Hidrología de Bolivia

== See also ==
- Bolivia Mar
