= Ch'alla Jawira (Callapa) =

- Etymology: Aymara

Location
- Country: Bolivia
- Region: La Paz Department, Pacajes Province, Callapa Municipality

Physical characteristics
- Source: Andes
  - location: Calapa Municipality
  - coordinates: 17°19′00″S 68°12′45″W
- Mouth: Desaguadero River
  - location: Calapa Municipality
  - coordinates: 17°28′30″S 68°18′55″W

The Ch'alla Jawira (Aymara ch'alla sand, jawira river, "sand river", also spelled Challa Jahuira) which upstream successively is named Chilla Jawira, Pichini Jawira, Janq'u Quta and Siwinqa is a river in the La Paz Department in Bolivia. It is a left tributary of the Desaguadero River.

Named Chilla Jawira the river originates from an intermittent stream at 17°19′00″S 68°12′45″W near another river named Ch'alla Jawira and a mountain named Jallawani in the Pacajes Province, Callapa Municipality. At first its direction is to the south. It flows along Romero Pampa and Pichini where it receives the name Pichini Jawira and shortly afterwards Janq'u Quta ("white lake"). North of Janq'u Qalani it turns to the southwest and gets the name Siwinqa. Near Jarana Pampa it turns to the west and changes its name to Ch'alla Jawira. It keeps this name up to its confluence with the Desaguadero River east of Callapa at 17°28′30″S 68°18′55″W.
