= Jach'a Phasa =

Archaeological site in Bolivia

- Location within Bolivia
- 17°23′47″S 68°48′13″W
- Type: Necropolis
- Location: La Paz Department, Pacajes Province, Calacoto Municipality
- Region: Andes

Site notes
- Height: 4126

Jach'a Phasa (Aymara, jach'a big, phasa edible earth, Hispanicized spellings Jachapasa, Jachapaza, Jachaphasa, Jachcha Paza) is an archaeological site in Bolivia located in the La Paz Department, Pacajes Province, Calacoto Municipality, about 2 km north-east of Rosario. It is situated at a height of 4,126 metres (13,537 ft) on top of the mountain Jach'a Phasa north of the Mawri River.

The place is covered with more than 50 chullpa and surrounded by a wall. The chullpa are constructed of stone of volcanic origin and mortar of mud and straw.

Near Jach'a Phasa there are more archaeological sites, the chullpa and the walls of Taypi Phasa (at 17°24′18″S 68°47′40″W) and the walls of Thiya Phasa (Tiaphasa) as well as Ch'iyara Chullpa situated about 3 km east of Rosario, a place with 78 chullpa.
