= Laram Quta (Los Andes) =

Lake in Pucarani Municipality, Bolivia

- Location within Bolivia Location within South America
- Interactive map of Laram Quta
- Location: Bolivia, La Paz Department, Los Andes Province
- Coordinates: 16°25′S 68°27′W
- Max. length: 1.7 km (1.1 mi)
- Max. width: 0.4 km (0.25 mi)
- Surface elevation: 3,850 m (12,630 ft)

Laram Quta (Aymara larama blue, quta lake, "blue lake", hispanicized spellings Laramkkota, Laram Kkota) is a lake in Bolivia located in the La Paz Department, Los Andes Province, Pucarani Municipality. It lies south east of Wiñaymarka, the southern part of Lake Titicaca and south of Pucarani. Laram Quta is situated at a height of about 3,850 metres (12,630 ft), about 1.7 km long and 0.4 km at its widest point.
