= Wila Qullu (Pacajes) =

Mountain in Bolivia

- Location within Bolivia

Highest point
- Elevation: 4,658 m (15,282 ft)
- Coordinates: 17°07′37″S 68°16′45″W

Geography
- Location: Bolivia, La Paz Department; Pacajes Province
- Parent range: Andes, Chilla-Kimsa Chata

Wila Qullu (Aymara, wila red, blood-red, qullu mountain, also spelled Wila Kkollu, Willa Kkollu) is a 4,658-metre-high (15,282 ft) mountain in the southern part of the Chilla-Kimsa Chata mountain range in the Andes of Bolivia. It is located in the La Paz Department, Pacajes Province, Waldo Ballivián Municipality. This is where the Ch'alla Jawira originates. Its waters flow to the Desaguadero River.
