= Llallawa Jawira =

- Etymology: Aymara

Location
- Country: Bolivia
- Region: La Paz Department, Pacajes Province, Callapa Municipality, Calacoto Municipality

Physical characteristics
- Source: Andes
  - location: Callapa Municipality
  - coordinates: 17°14′25″S 68°16′50″W
- Mouth: Desaguadero River
  - location: Callapa Municipality, Calacoto Municipality
  - coordinates: 17°26′00″S 68°32′00″W

Basin features
- Tributaries
  - left: Jallawani Uma, Yawri Qalani, Taypi Churu, Ch'iyar Jawira, Uma Jalsuri, Qala Sayani
  - right: Pajcha Pata, Ch'illiwa

The Llallawa Jawira (Aymara llallawa a monstrous potato (like two potatoes) or animal, jawira river, also spelled Llallagua Jahuira) which upstream successively is named Patu Uma, Ch'alla Jawira, Jach'a Qura, Lupipi and Chuqi Phuju is a river in the La Paz Department in Bolivia. It is a left tributary of the Desaguadero River.

== Course ==
Named Patu Uma the river originates from intermittent streams south of a mountain named Mula Chaka northeast of the village of Jach'a Uta in the Pacajes Province, Callapa Municipality, at 17°14′25″S 68°16′50″W. It flows towards the village of Inka Uyu in the southeast. While it surrounds the plains named T'ula Chita Pampa, T'utur Juqhu Pampa and T'ulan Chata Pampa it receives the names Ch'alla Jawira ("sand river") and Jach'a Qura ("big herb" (river)). East of Lupipi it gets that name. It flows to the west. East of Wankarani it turns to the south and then west again near the village of Chuqi Phuju ("gold spring", Choque Phuju, Choque Puju, Choquepujo) where the river is called after the village. From now on its direction is mainly to the southwest. Before it reaches the village of Llallawa it receives the name Llallawa Jawira. The confluence of the Llallawa Jawira and the Desaguadero River is in the Willk'i Pampa ("gap plain", Willkhi Pampa), near T'uturani (Totorani) on the border of the municipalities of Calacoto (Qala Qutu) and Callapa at 17°26′00″S 68°32′00″W.

== Tributaries ==
Some of the left affluents of the Llallawa Jawira are Jallawani Uma, Yawri Qalani, Taypi Churu, Ch'iyar Jawira, Uma Jalsuri and Qala Sayani. Pajcha Pata and Ch'illiwa are right tributaries.
