= Kunturiri (Pacajes) =

Mountain in Bolivia

- Location within Bolivia

Highest point
- Elevation: 4,998 m (16,398 ft)
- Coordinates: 17°46′21″S 69°05′02″W

Geography
- Location: Bolivia, La Paz Department, Pacajes Province
- Parent range: Andes

Kunturiri (Aymara kunturi condor, -(i)ri a suffix, Hispanicized spelling Condoriri) is a 4,998-metre-high (16,398 ft) mountain in the Andes of Bolivia. It is situated in the La Paz Department, Pacajes Province, Charaña Municipality. Kunturiri lies north-west of the mountain Wayra Lupi Qullu and north-east of the mountain Ch'iyara Salla.
