= Ch'uxña Quta (Pacajes) =

Mountain in Bolivia

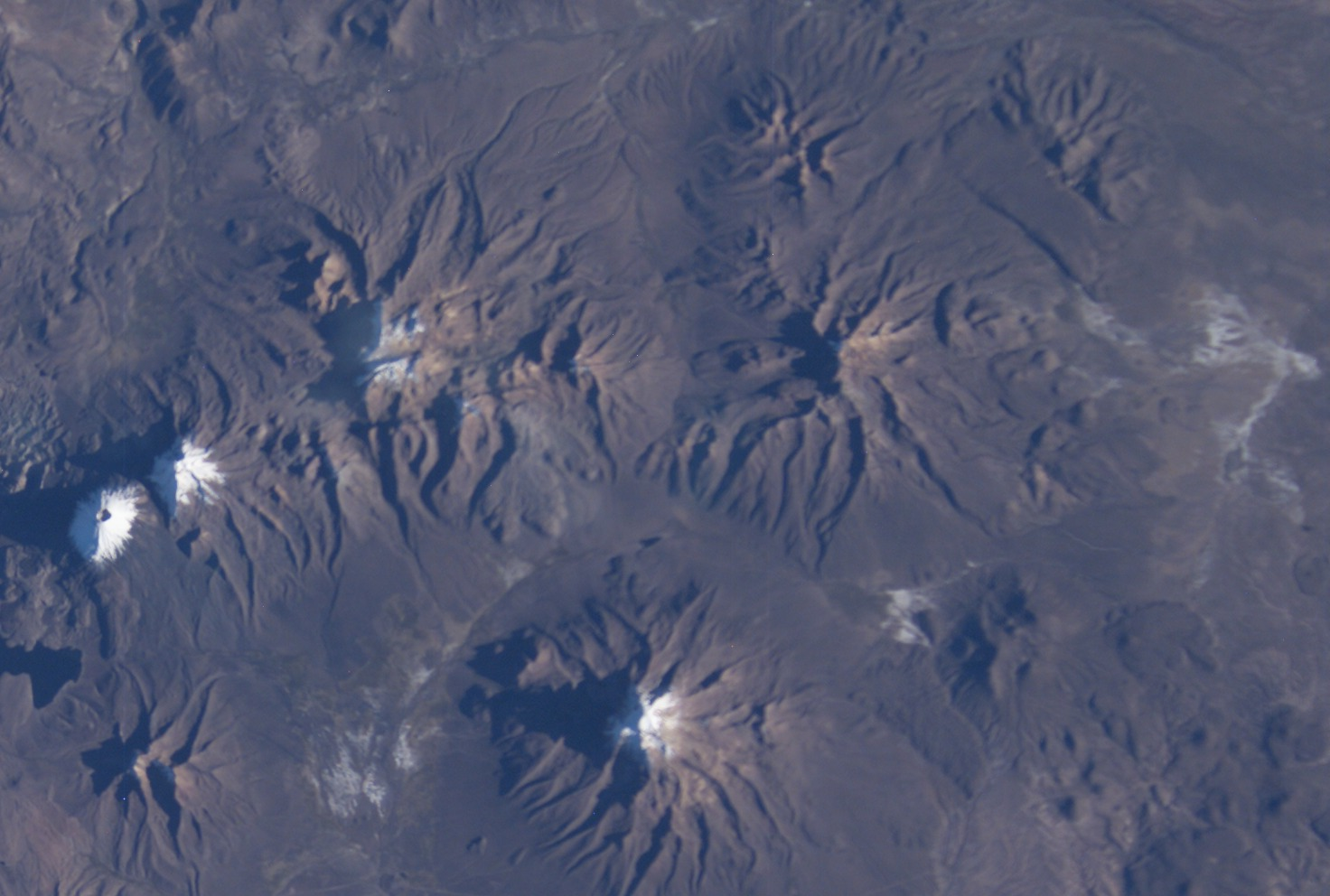
- Ch'uxña Quta is visible in the upper part of this satellite image (center, right). Sajama volcano is shown in the lower center.

Highest point
- Elevation: 4,952 m (16,247 ft)
- Coordinates: 17°52′39″S 68°58′23″W

Geography
- Location within Bolivia
- Location: Bolivia, La Paz Department, Pacajes Province
- Parent range: Andes

Ch'uxña Quta (Aymara ch'uxña green, quta lake "green lake", also spelled Chojña Kkota) is a 4,952-metre-high (16,247 ft) mountain in the Andes of Bolivia. It is situated in the La Paz Department, Pacajes Province, Calacoto Municipality, north-west of the extinct Sajama volcano. It lies south-west of the mountain Suni Q'awa.
