= Callapa =

- Town
- Location within Bolivia
- Coordinates: 17°29′S 68°21′W
- Country: Bolivia
- Department: La Paz Department
- Province: Pacajes Province
- Municipality: Santiago de Callapa Municipality
- Elevation: 12,457 ft (3,797 m)

Population (2001)
  - Total: 268
- Time zone: UTC-4 (BOT)

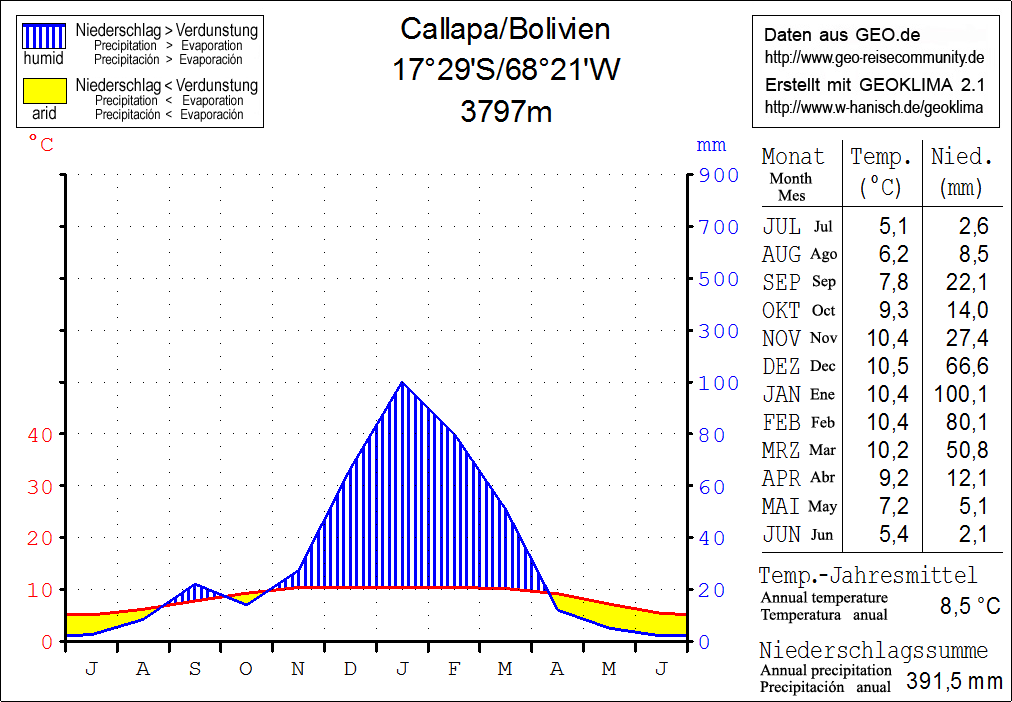
Callapa Climate chart

Callapa is a location in the La Paz Department in Bolivia. It is the seat of the Santiago de Callapa Municipality, the eighth municipal section of the Pacajes Province.
