= Q'ilani =

Mountain in Bolivia

- Location within Bolivia

Highest point
- Elevation: 4,686 m (15,374 ft)
- Coordinates: 17°04′18″S 68°21′48″W

Geography
- Location: Bolivia; La Paz Department
- Parent range: Andes

Q'ilani (Aymara q'ila a kind of flower, similar to the lupin, -ni a suffix, "the one with the q'ila plant", also spelled Kelani) is a 4,686-metre-high (15,374 ft) mountain in Bolivia. It is located in the La Paz Department, Pacajes Province, Coro Coro Municipality.

The Jach'a Jawira (Aymara for "big river") which later is named Colorado, Mani, then Colorado again and finally Katari originates northeast of the mountain. It empties into Wiñaymarka Lake, the southern part of Lake Titicaca.
