= Janq'u Qalani (Pacajes) =

Mountain in Bolivia

- Location within Bolivia

Highest point
- Elevation: 4,200 m (13,800 ft)
- Coordinates: 17°10′52″S 68°13′09″W

Geography
- Location: Bolivia; La Paz Department
- Parent range: Andes

Janq'u Qalani (Aymara janq'u white, qala stone, -ni a suffix, "the one with the white stone", also spelled Jankho Khalani) is a mountain in the Bolivian Andes which reaches a height of approximately 4,200 m (13,800 ft). It is located in the La Paz Department, Pacajes Province, Coro Coro Municipality. Janq'u Qalani lies on the bank of the Ch'alla Jawira ("sand river").
