= Nazacara de Pacajes Municipality =

Nazacara de Pacajes Municipality Nasa Q'ara
- Municipality
- Location of the Nazacara de Pacajes Municipality within Bolivia
- Coordinates: 17°00′0″S 68°45′0″W
- Country: Bolivia
- Department: La Paz Department
- Province: Pacajes Province
- Seat: Nazacara

Government
  - Mayor: Romualdo Fernández (2007)
  - President: Ceferino Laura Barrionuevo (2007)

Area
  - Total: 7.3 sq mi (19 km^{2})
- Elevation: 12,500 ft (3,800 m)

Population (2001)
  - Total: 267
- Time zone: UTC-4 (BOT)

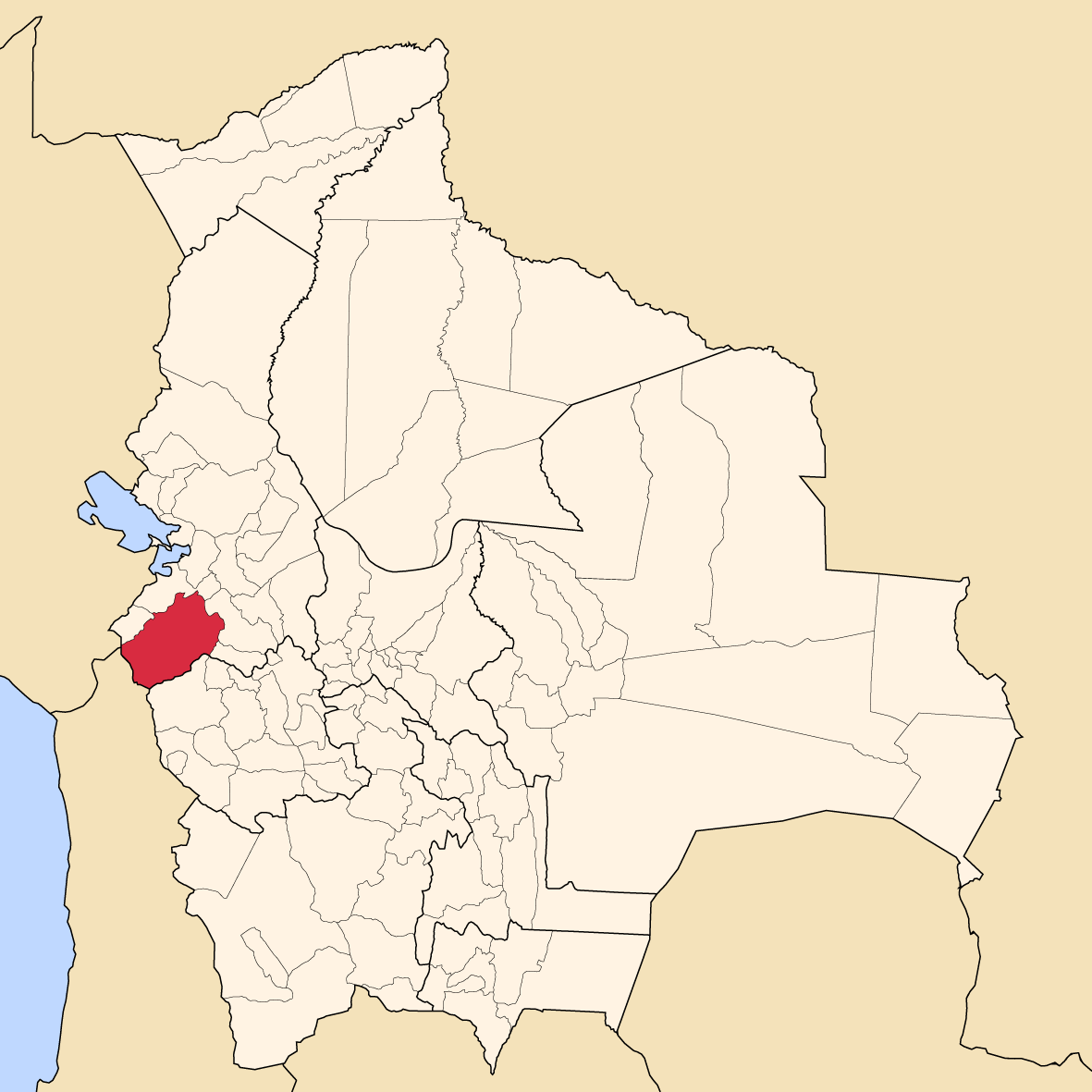
Pacajes province, Bolivia

Nazacara de Pacajes Municipality is the seventh municipal section of the Pacajes Province in the La Paz Department, Bolivia. Its seat is Nazacara.
