= Laram Q'awa (Río Blanco) =

Mountain in Bolivia

- Location within Bolivia

Highest point
- Elevation: 4,996 m (16,391 ft)
- Coordinates: 17°50′38″S 69°09′15″W

Geography
- Location: Bolivia, La Paz Department, Pacajes Province
- Parent range: Andes

Laram Q'awa (Aymara larama blue, q'awa little river, ditch, crevice, fissure, gap in the earth, "blue brook" or "blue ravine", also spelled Laramkhaua) is a 4,996-metre-high (16,391 ft) mountain in the Andes of Bolivia. It is situated in the La Paz Department, Pacajes Province, Charaña Municipality, north-west of Río Blanco. An intermittent stream which downstream is named Jach'a Uma ("big water", Jacha Uma) originates near the mountain. It flows to Achuta River in the south-east.
