= Pichaqa =

Mountain in Bolivia

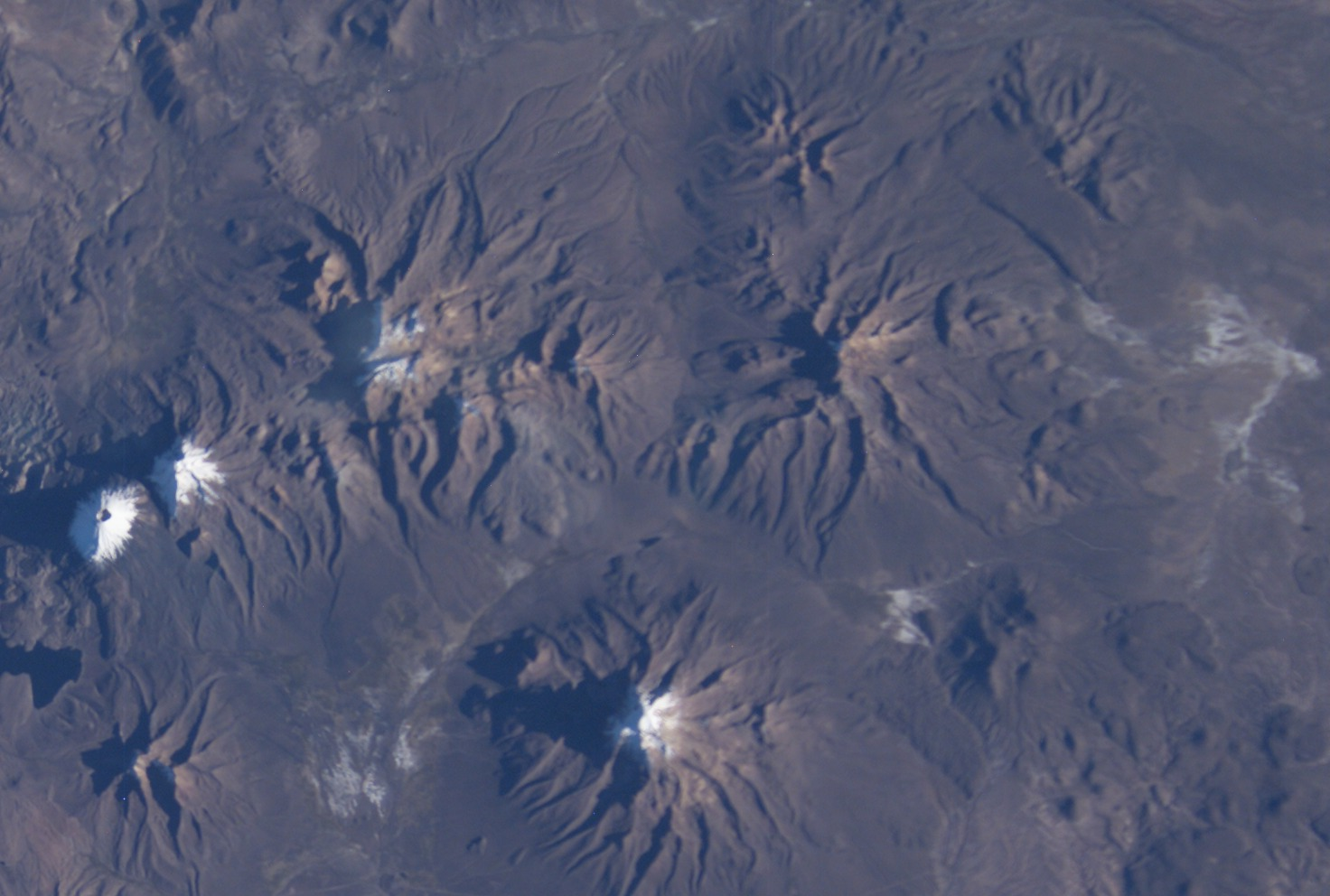
- Pichaqa is visible in the upper right part of this satellite image. Sajama volcano is shown in the lower center.

Highest point
- Elevation: 4,512 m (14,803 ft)
- Coordinates: 17°48′35″S 68°51′32″W

Geography
- Location within Bolivia
- Location: Bolivia, La Paz Department
- Parent range: Andes

Pichaqa (Aymara pichaqa, phichaqa, piqacha a big needle, also spelled Pichaka) is a 4,512-metre-high (14,803 ft) mountain in the Andes of Bolivia. It is situated in the La Paz Department, Pacajes Province, Calacoto Municipality. Pichaqa lies north-east of the Anallajsi volcano.
