= Allqa Quta =

Lake in La Paz Department, Bolivia

- Laguna Allka Kkota
- Location within Bolivia Location within South America
- Interactive map of Allqa Quta
- Location: Bolivia, La Paz Department, Los Andes Province
- Coordinates: 16°09′05″S 68°17′48″W

Allqa Quta (Aymara allqa multicolored, quta lake, "multicolored lake", also spelled Allka Kkota) is a lake in the Cordillera Real of Bolivia. It is located in the La Paz Department, Los Andes Province, Pucarani Municipality. Allqa Quta lies northwest of the main peak of the Kunturiri massif. It is south of a mountain named Nasa Q'ara, north of Wawanaki and northeast of Ch'iyar K'ark'a and another mountain named Nasa Q'ara.
