= Wayra Lupi Qullu =

Mountain in Bolivia

- Location within Bolivia

Highest point
- Elevation: 4,732 m (15,525 ft)
- Coordinates: 17°47′09″S 69°01′20″W

Geography
- Location: Bolivia, La Paz Department, Pacajes Province
- Parent range: Andes

Wayra Lupi Qullu (Aymara wayra wind, lupi sun ray, qullu mountain, also spelled Huayra Lupe Kkollu) is a 4,732-metre-high (15,525 ft) mountain in the Andes of Bolivia. It is located in the La Paz Department, Pacajes Province, Charaña Municipality. It lies at the river Phaq'u Q'awa ("brown brook", Pacokhaua) which later is named Achuta. Wayra Lupi Qullu is situated east of the mountains Ch'iyara Salla and Kunturiri.
