= Nazacara =

Nazacara Nasa Q'ara
- Village
- Location within Bolivia
- Coordinates: 16°56′S 68°46′W
- Country: Bolivia
- Department: La Paz Department
- Province: Ingavi Province
- Municipality: San Andrés de Machaca Municipality

Population (2001)
  - Total: 208
- Time zone: UTC-4 (BOT)

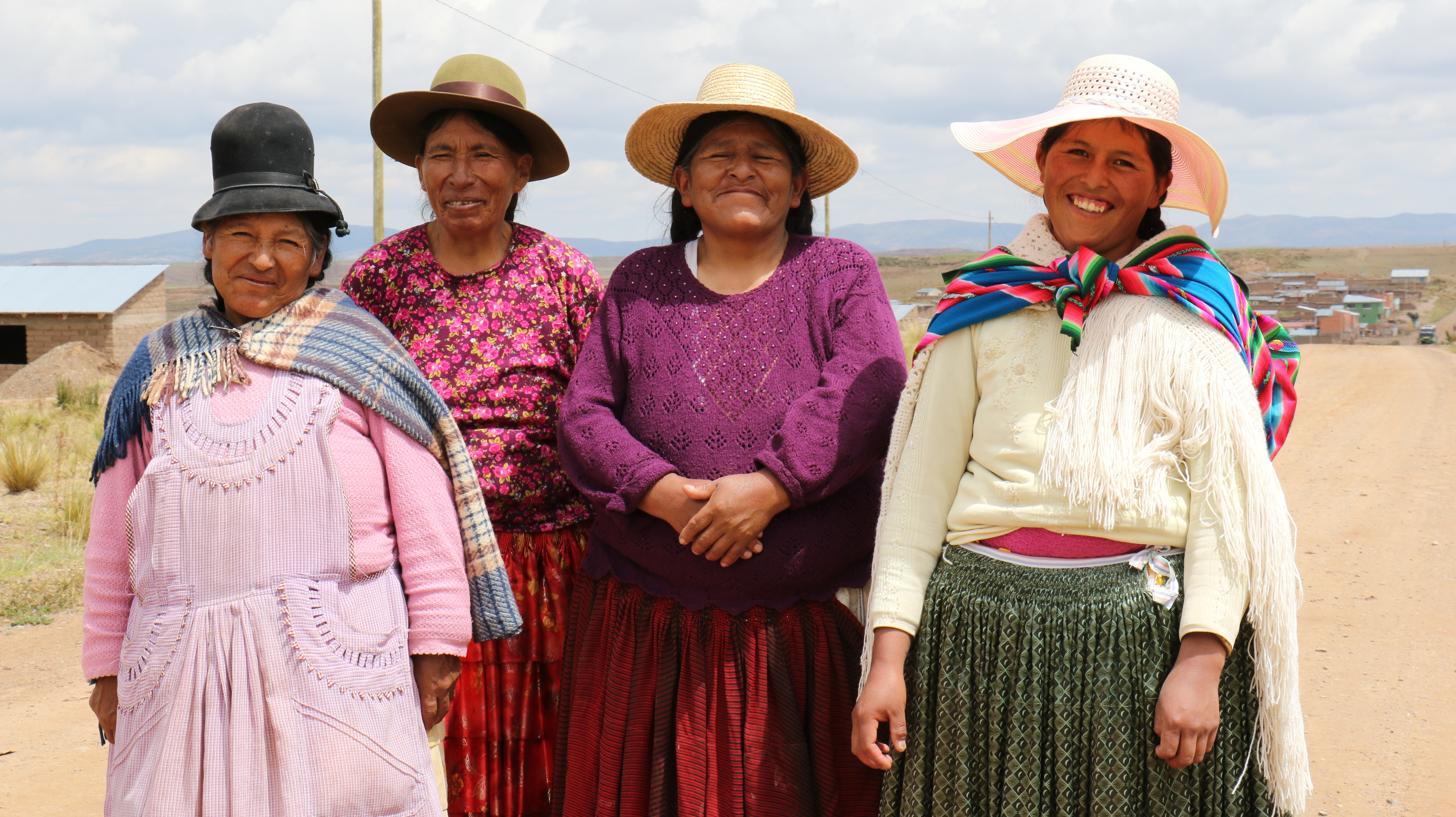
Inhabitants of Nazacara, Bolivia

Nazacara (Hispanicized spelling) or Nasa Q'ara (Aymara nasa nose, q'ara bare, bald) is a village in the La Paz Department in Bolivia. It is the seat of the Nazacara Canton in the San Andrés de Machaca Municipality which is the fifth municipal section of the Ingavi Province.
