= Pucarani =

Pucarani Pukarani
- Town
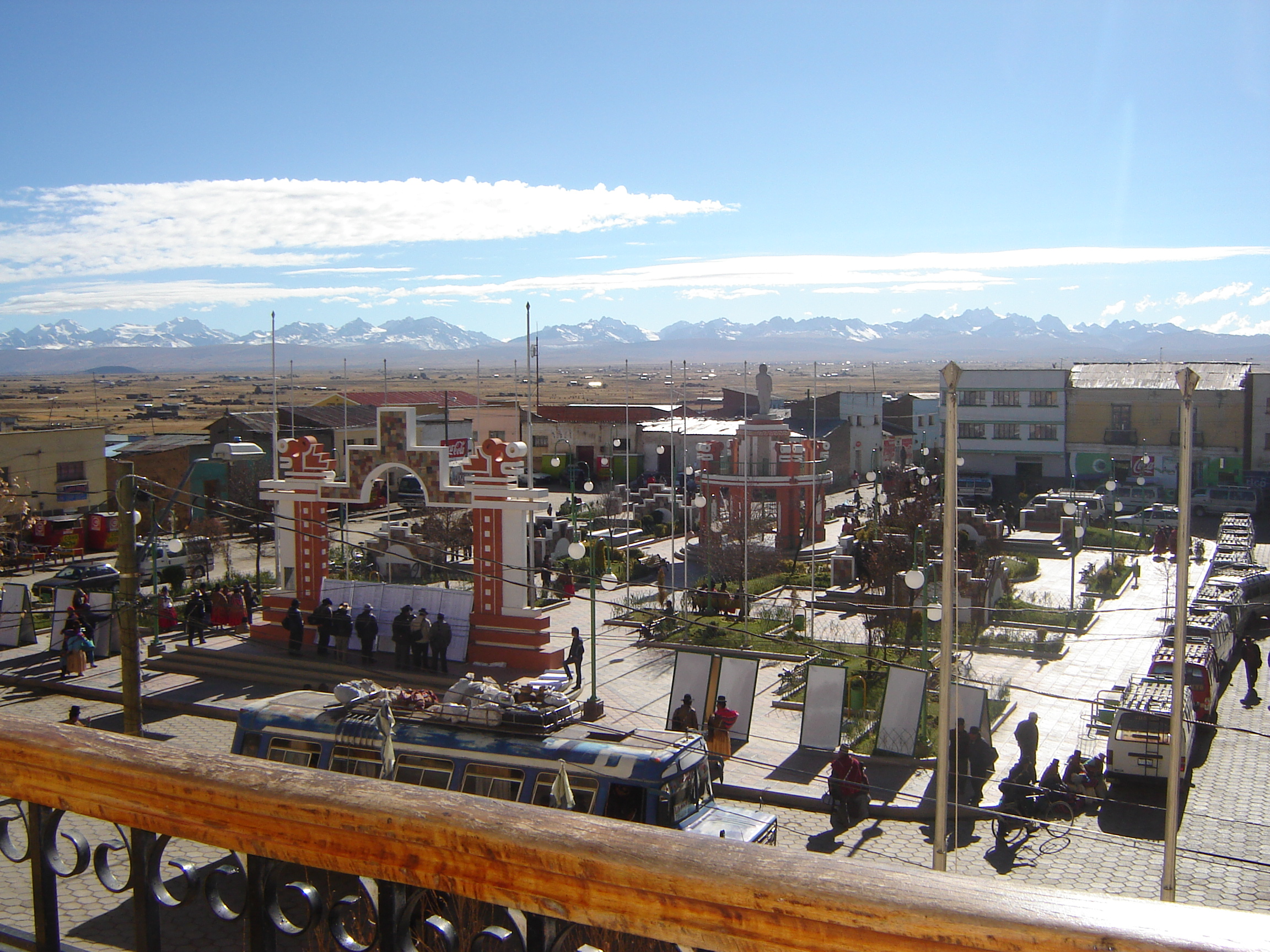
- Pucarani with the Cordillera Real in the background

- Location within Bolivia
- Coordinates: 16°24′S 68°29′W
- Country: Bolivia
- Department: La Paz Department
- Province: Los Andes Province
- Municipality: Pucarani Municipality

Population (2001)
  - Total: 918
- Time zone: UTC-4 (BOT)

Pucarani (from Aymara Pukarani) is a small town in the La Paz Department in Bolivia. It is the seat of the Pucarani Municipality, the first municipal section of the Los Andes Province and of the province.

== See also ==
- Laram Quta
