= Ch'iyar Quta (La Paz) =

Lake in the Cordillera Real of Bolivia

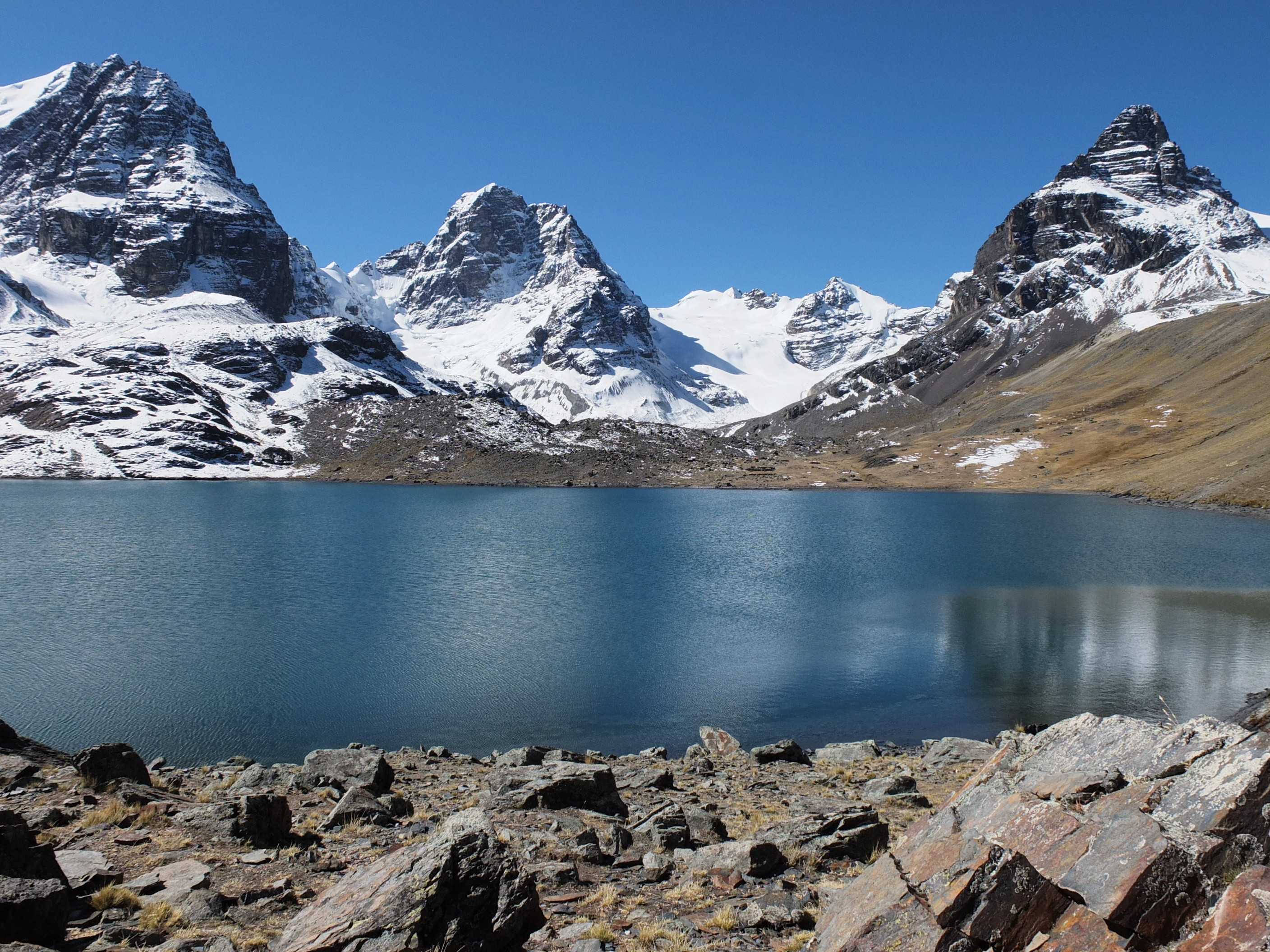

- Location within Bolivia Location within South America
- Interactive map of Ch'iyar Quta
- Location: Bolivia, La Paz Department, Los Andes Province
- Coordinates: 16°11′42″S 68°14′38″W
- Surface elevation: 4,700 m (15,400 ft)

Ch'iyar Quta (Aymara ch'iyara black, quta lake, "black lake", hispanicized spellings Chiar Khota, Chiar Kkota, Chiar Quota) is a lake in the Cordillera Real of Bolivia situated in the La Paz Department, Los Andes Province, Pucarani Municipality, Huayna Potosí Canton. It is situated at a height of about 4,700 metres (15,400 ft) near the peaks of Kunturiri and east of the lake Juri Quta.
