= Juri Quta (Pukarani) =

Lake in La Paz Department, Bolivia

- Location within Bolivia Location within South America
- Interactive map of Juri Quta
- Location: Bolivia, La Paz Department, Los Andes Province, Pukarani Municipality
- Coordinates: 16°11′37″S 68°16′20″W
- Surface elevation: 4,932 m (16,181 ft)

Juri Quta (Aymara juri mud, foul water, dull, wet quta lake, "mud lake" or "dull lake ", Hispanicized spellings Juri Kkota, Juri Khota, Juri Kota, Yuri Kkota) is a lake in the Cordillera Real of Bolivia located in the La Paz Department, Los Andes Province, Pukarani Municipality, Wayna Potosí Canton. It is situated at a height of about 4,932 metres (16,181 ft) south west of the Kunturiri massif and west of lake Ch'iyar Quta.

== See also ==
- Sura Quta
