= Nevado Anallajsi =

Volcano in Bolivia

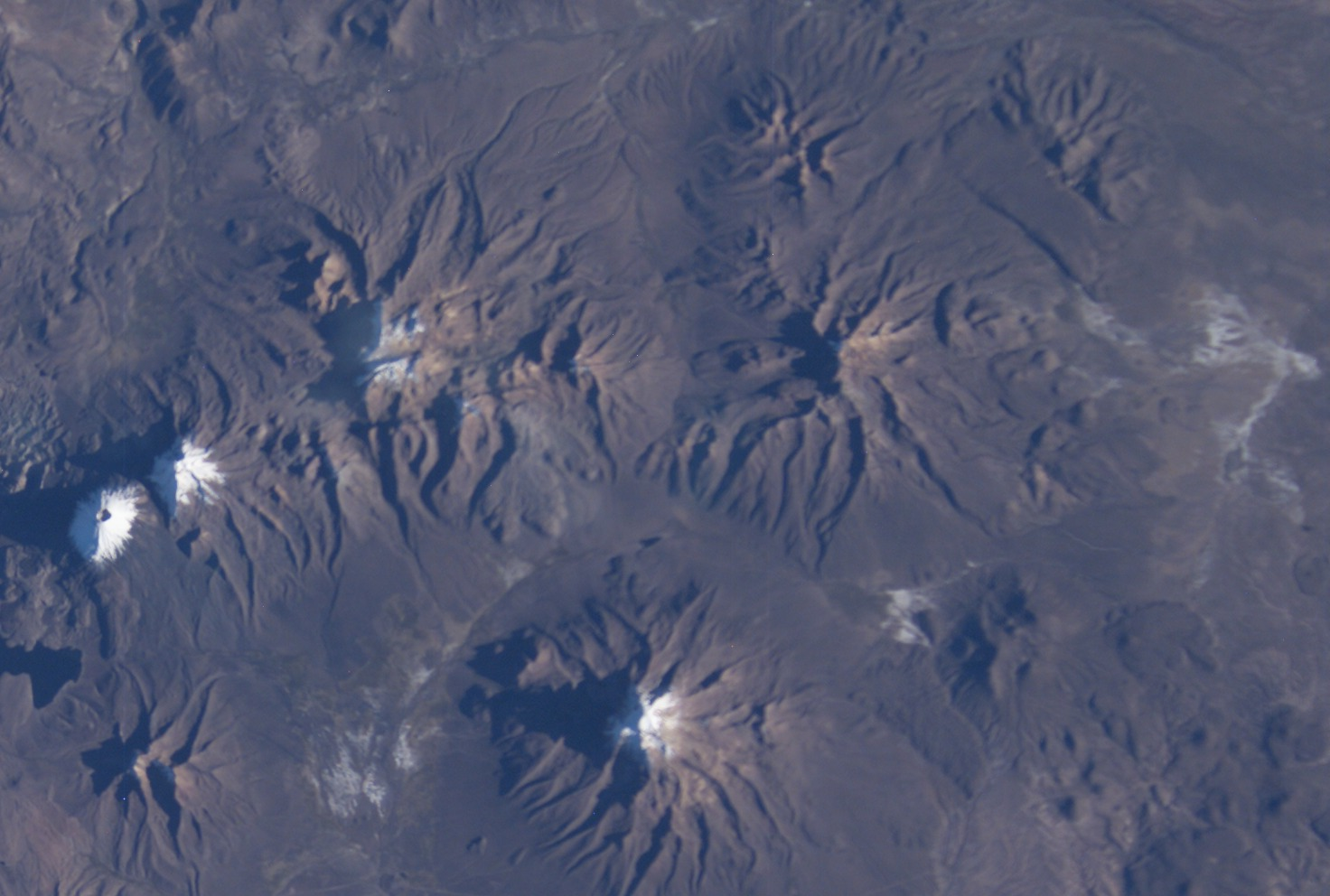
- The upper right part of the NASA Space Shuttle image shows the eroded volcanic complex Nevado Anallajsi.

Highest point
- Elevation: 5,750 m (18,860 ft)
- Coordinates: 17°55′S 68°55′W

Geography
- Location within Bolivia
- Location: Bolivia
- Parent range: Andes

Geology
- Mountain type: Stratovolcano
- Last eruption: Unknown

Nevado Anallajsi is a stratovolcano in Bolivia. The date of its last eruption is unknown, but its youngest lava flows appear to have erupted from a vent on the north flank of the mountain. The main composition of the volcano is andesitic and dacitic. It overlies a plateau which is composed of ignimbrite. The volcano covers an area of 368.8 square kilometres (142.4 sq mi) and is 10.2 mya old based on its erosion state, while other estimates indicate an age of 2.6 mya.

== See also ==
- List of volcanoes in Bolivia

== Sources ==
- "Nevado Anallajsi". Global Volcanism Program. Smithsonian Institution.
