= Kunturiri (Los Andes) =

Mountain in Bolivia

- Kunturiri as seen from the lake Ch'iyar Quta

Highest point
- Elevation: 5,648 m (18,530 ft)
- Coordinates: 16°10′06″S 68°14′34″W

Geography
- Location within Bolivia
- Location: Bolivia
- Parent range: Andes, Cordillera Real

Climbing
- First ascent: Wilfrid Kühm, 1941

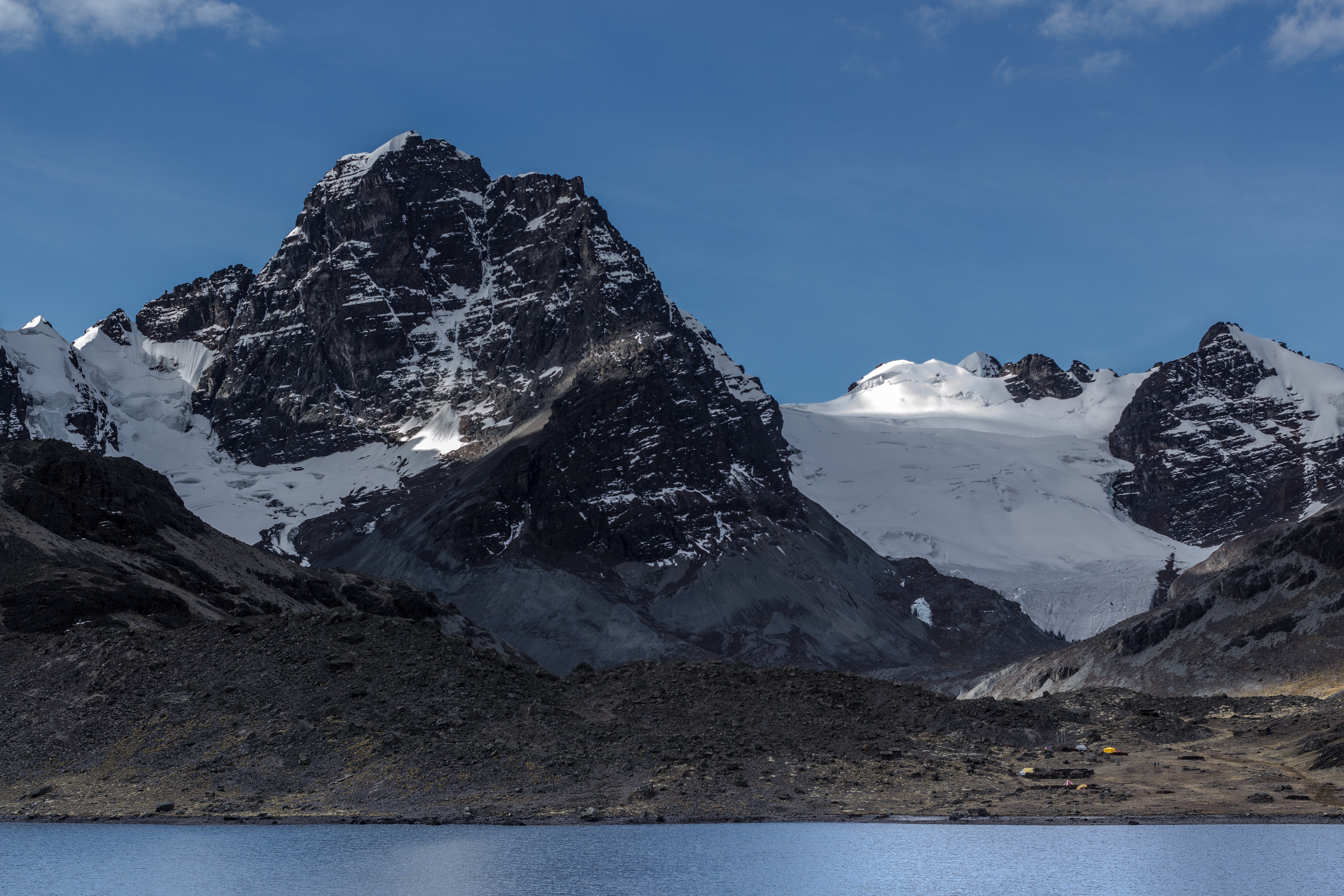
Peaks east of the main group as seen from Ch'iyar Quta. Tarija, Pequeño Alpamayo and Diente are in the background. Jist'aña is on the right.

Kunturiri (Aymara kunturi condor, -(i)ri a suffix, Hispanicized spelling Condoriri) is a mountain in the Cordillera Real of Bolivia, about 5,648 metres (18,530 ft) high. It is also the name of the whole massif. Kunturiri is located in the La Paz Department, Los Andes Province, Pukarani Municipality, southeast of Chachakumani and northwest of Huayna Potosí.

The central part of the Kunturiri group is formed by three peaks which resemble a condor with wings spread:

- the Kunturiri itself, also called Cabeza de(l) Condor (Spanish for "head of the condor") (5,648 metres (18,530 ft)),
- Ala Izquierda ("left wing"), Ala Norte ("north wing") (5,532 metres (18,150 ft)), the Kunturiri west peak and
- Ala Derecha ("right wing") or Ala Sur ("south wing") (5,482 metres (17,986 ft)).

Kuchillu Khunu (Aymara kuchillu knife (from Spanish cuchillo), khunu snow, "knife snow") is the name of the peak south of the "head of the condor" at 16°10′47″S 68°14′50″W.

Other peaks in the Kunturiri massif are Pico Reya (5,495 metres (18,028 ft)), Qallwani (Yugoslavia) (5,492 metres (18,018 ft)) 2 km north of Kunturiri, Wintanani (5,428 metres (17,808 ft)), Pico Eslovenia (5,381 metres (17,654 ft)), Pequeño Alpamayo (5,370 metres (17,618 ft)), Pico Medio (5,355 metres (17,569 ft)), Ilusión (5,330 metres (17,487 ft)), Aguja Negra (5,290 metres (17,356 ft)), Jist'aña (5,260 metres (17,257 ft)), Diente (5,200 metres (17,060 ft)), Ilusioncita (5,150 metres (16,896 ft)), Tarija (5,060 metres (16,601 ft)) and Titicaca (4,968 metres (16,299 ft)). The Spanish names of the peaks do not occur in the maps of the Bolivian IGM (Instituto Geográfico Militar).

The lakes Ch'iyar Quta and Juri Quta are situated south of the massif.

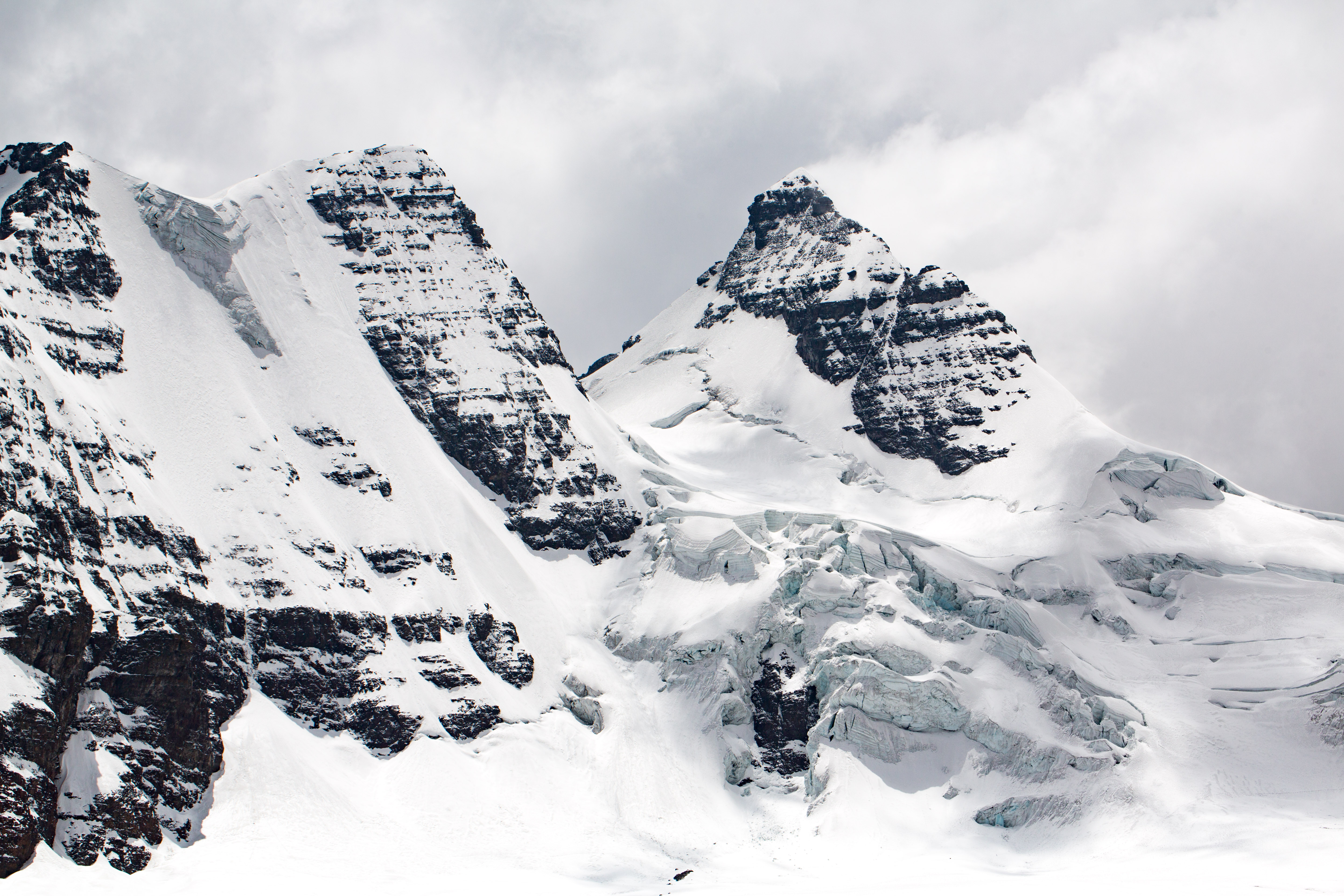
Kunturiri seen from the south-western side on the way up to Pico Austria

== See also ==
- Jist'aña
