= Sajsi =

Former lake

Sajsi is the name of an ancient lake in the Andes

The existence of ancient lakes in the Altiplano was proposed as early as 1882. At first, a Lake Minchin was identified with ages of 30,000 years or older; later additional lake cycles were recognized. The minor ones include Inca Huasi, Salinas and Coipasa. The major ones include Lake Tauca and Ouki. Because of this, it was proposed that Lake Minchin was actually a combination of several different ancient lakes.

This lake occupied the area of the current Salar de Uyuni; it also covered the Salar de Coipasa but it is not clear whether and how it extended in the Lake Poopo. Its waters reached altitudes of 3,670 metres (12,040 ft) and its depth did not exceed 17 metres (56 ft). A sample dated 23,700 ± 2,600 years ago by uranium-thorium dating indicates that lake levels at that point were about 15 metres (49 ft) deep in the Uyuni basin. Water levels subsequently decreased to less than 5 metres (16 ft) above the present day levels before Lake Tauca formed, however both the timing and the history of water levels are uncertain. The surface area of the lake may have been 21,000 square kilometres (8,100 sq mi) during the highstand. By 19,900 ± 900 - 18,700 ± 200 years ago, the Lake Tauca was beginning to form. The so-called "L2" unit in drill cores in Salar de Uyuni may correspond to both the Sajsi and the later Lake Tauca cycle. Strontium isotope data indicate that about 41% of the water in Sajsi came from Lake Poopo and 4% from Lake Titicaca.

Radiocarbon dates have been obtained for Sajsi-age ooids and tufa, uncalibrated they range from 17,080 ± 720 to 20,830 ± 140 years ago. Later dates indicated that the lake existed between 25,000 and 19,000 years ago and reached its maximum depth 23,000 years ago. The existence of this lake coincides with the Last Glacial Maximum. Earlier, lakes had formed in the Laguna Blanca, the Salar de Atacama, as well as the Pozuelos Basin in northwest Argentina. Given evidence from the Bolivian Eastern Cordillera and the small size of the glacial Sajsi and Inca Huasi paleolakes, it is likely that the Last Glacial Maximum was accompanied by a dry climate on the Altiplano and indeed climate modelling shows that only a small precipitation increase - or none at all - would be needed to create the Sajsi lake. Glacier expansion is recorded at that time in Northwest Argentina. The second Heinrich event seems to coincide with the Sajsi lake period.

A maximum in local insolation about 21,000 years ago coincides with the existence of the Sajsi lake but was probably not responsible for the lake's existence. Farther south, precipitation in the drainage area of the Rio Salado had increased by 10 millimetres per year (0.39 in/year) during the Sajsi time, and there are isotope changes in Brazilian speleothems. Lakes formed within the Western Cordillera and the Bolivian Chaco likewise shows evidence of increased precipitation. Rising water levels during the Sajsi reduced dust deflation. The Sajsi lake was apparently followed by Lake Tauca, but evidence is lacking. Another theory postulates that Sajsi was simply a sub-phase of Lake Tauca, an interpretation applied in particular to data taken from drill cores.
