= Lake Tauca =

- Lake Pocoyu
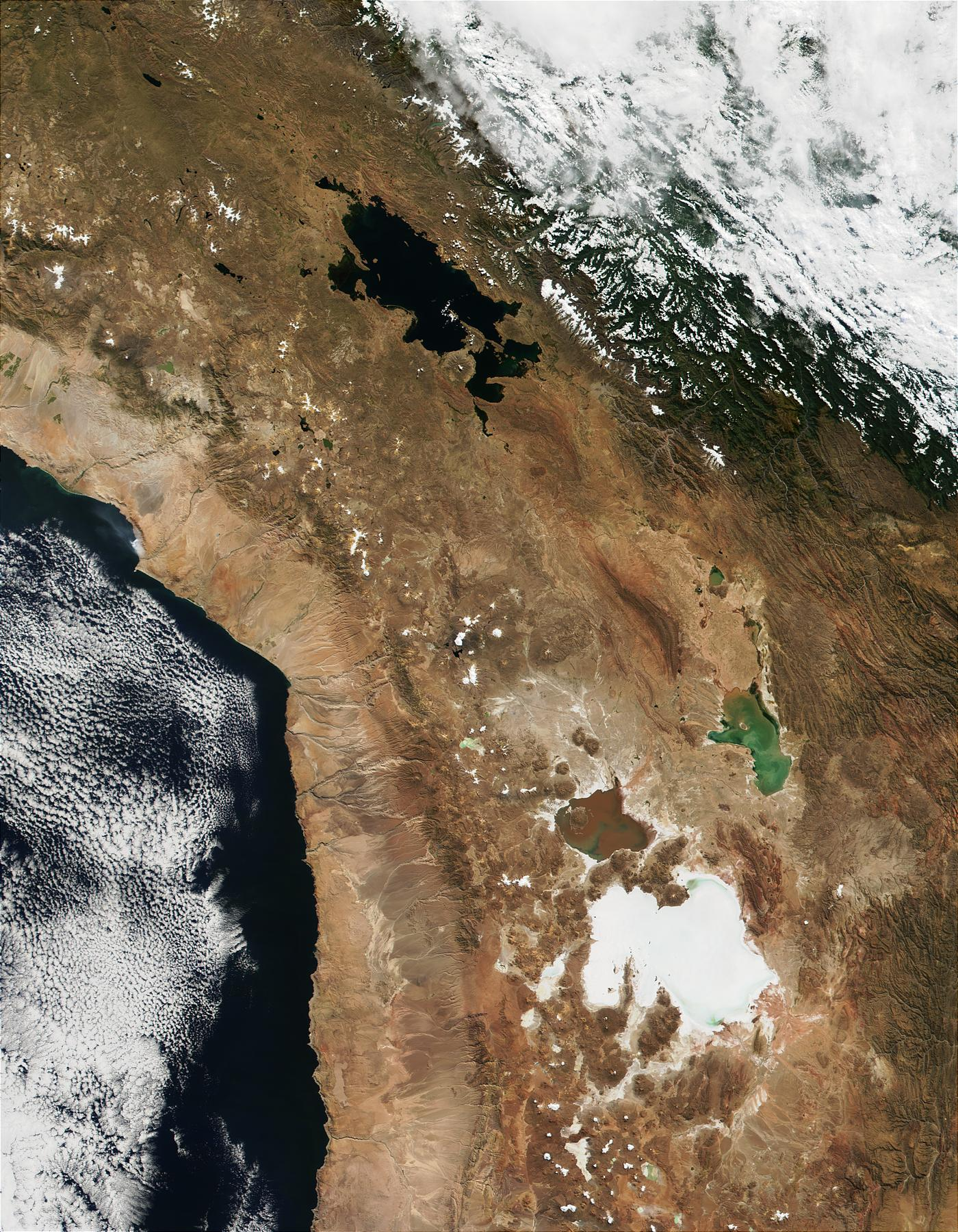
- Satellite image of the Altiplano. The green, brown and white surfaces in the lower right quadrant of the image are Lake Poopó, Salar de Coipasa and Salar de Uyuni, respectively. The blue surface at centre top is Lake Titicaca

- Location within Bolivia
- Location: Andes, South America
- Coordinates: 20°S 68°W
- Type: Former lake Pleisto- Holocene glacial lake 72,600–7200 BP
- Part of: Altiplano
- Primary inflows: Glacial meltwater Desaguadero River, Río Grande de Lipez, Lauca River
- Primary outflows: Potentially Pilcomayo River
- Basin countries: Bolivia, Chile, Peru
- Surface area: 48,000–80,000 km^{2} (19,000–31,000 sq mi)
- Average depth: 100 m (330 ft)
- Max. depth: 142 m (466 ft)
- Water volume: 1,200–3,810 km^{3} (290–910 cu mi)
- Salinity: 20–90 g/L (0.00072–0.00325 lb/cu in)
- Surface elevation: 3,660–3,770 m (12,010–12,370 ft)
- Max. temperature: 10 °C (50 °F)
- Min. temperature: 2 °C (36 °F)

Lake Tauca is a former lake in the Bolivian Altiplano, a high plateau in the central Andes. At high water levels, the lake spread across the southern Altiplano between the Eastern and Western Cordilleras, flooding the basins that now hold Lake Poopó and the Uyuni and Coipasa salars. Published area estimates range from about 48,000 to 80,000 square kilometres (19,000 to 31,000 sq mi). Water levels varied, possibly reaching about 3,800 metres (12,500 ft) above sea level, and its waters were saline. The lake received water from Lake Titicaca, although estimates of Titicaca's contribution vary widely. Tauca was large enough to influence local climate and to depress the underlying terrain under its own weight. The lake supported aquatic plants, diatoms and animals. Algae and microorganisms also helped form reef-like carbonate knolls along its shores.

The timing and duration of Lake Tauca's existence remain uncertain. One reconstruction places the beginning of rising water levels around 18,500 years ago, followed by a major highstand between about 16,000 and 14,500 years ago. Water levels subsequently fell (in a drying possibly related to the Bølling–Allerød climatic oscillation) before rising again during a later phase that lasted until about 11,500 years ago. Some researchers extend the final phase to about 8,500 years ago. As the lake dried, it left the salt deposits of Salar de Uyuni.

Lake Tauca was one of several ancient lakes that formed on the Altiplano, alongside earlier lake cycles known as Escara, Ouki, Salinas, Minchin, Inca Huasi and Sajsi, as well as repeated highstands of Lake Titicaca. The relationships among these phases remain debated. Sajsi is often treated as part of the Tauca system, which is itself commonly divided into the earlier Ticaña phase and the later Coipasa phase.

The lake formed during a period when the Altiplano became colder and wetter. Changes in large-scale atmospheric circulation, possibly involving a shift in the Intertropical Convergence Zone (ITCZ), strengthened the transport of moisture from the east. Although early explanations emphasised glacial meltwater, melting ice alone could not have supplied enough water to fill the lake. Glaciers also advanced during this period, leaving evidence at Cerro Azanaques and Tunupa. Other parts of South America experienced rising lake levels and glacier expansion at the same time.

== Description ==
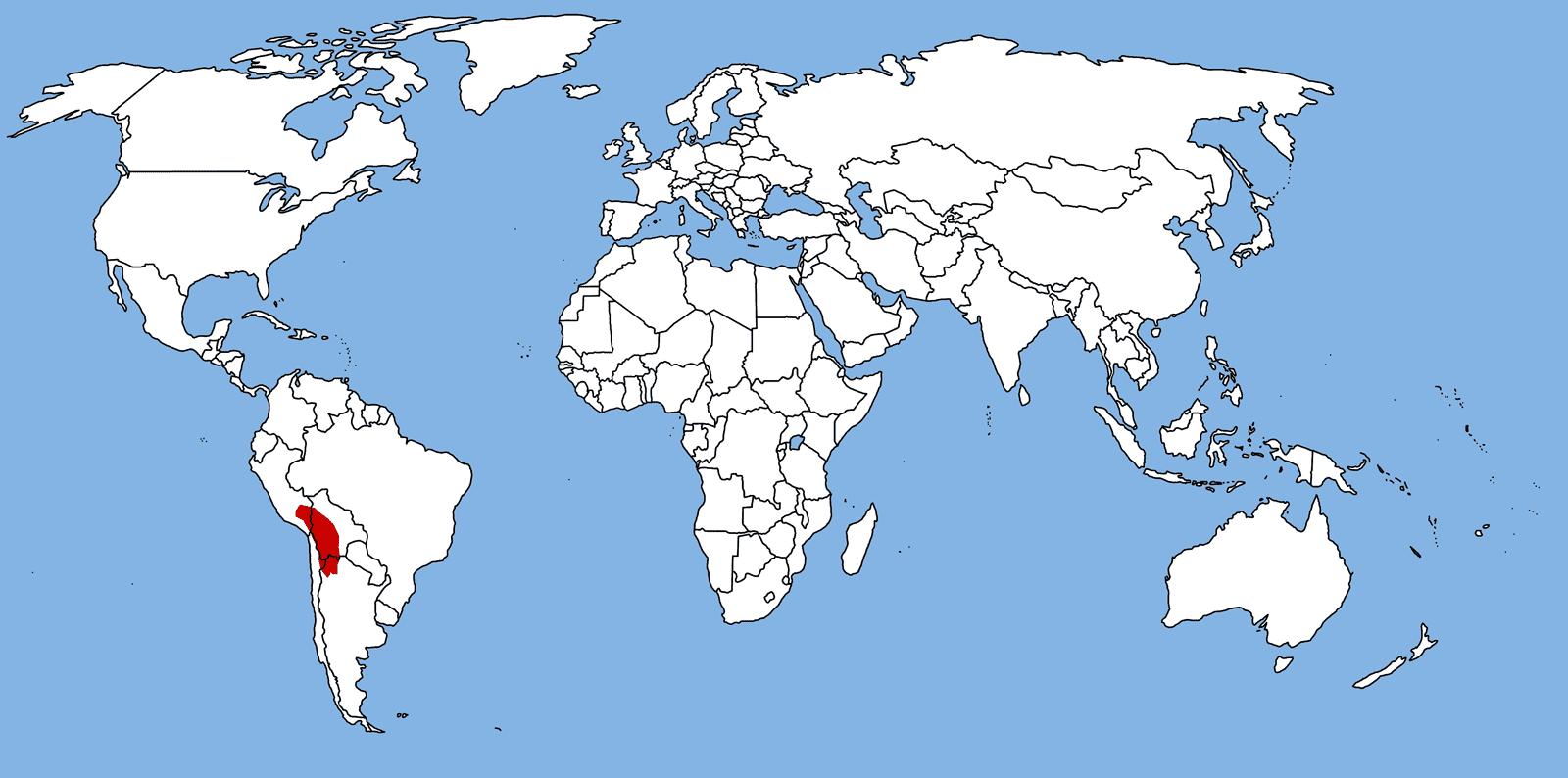
The Altiplano, in red

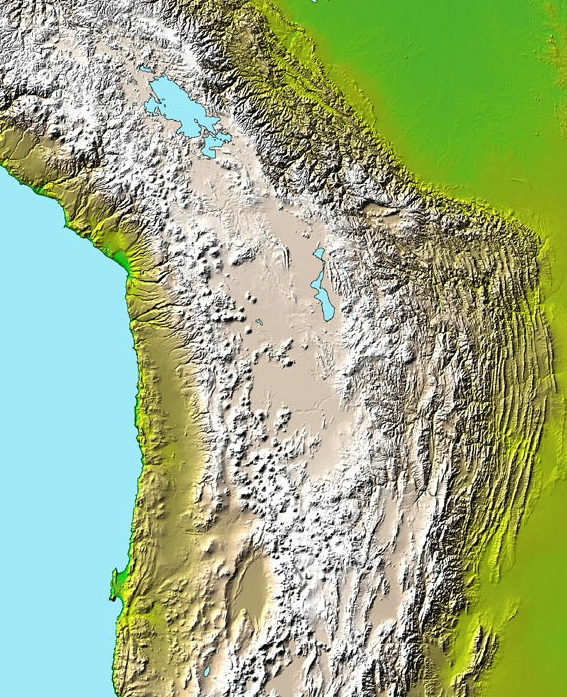
The Altiplano and extent of Lake Tauca, clearly visible in the topography of the central Andes

=== Overview ===
Lake Tauca formed on the Altiplano, a 1,000 by 200 kilometres (620 mi × 120 mi) wide high plateau in the central Andes. It lies about 3,800 to 4,000 metres (12,500 to 13,100 ft) metres above sea level between Bolivia's Eastern and Western Cordilleras. The Andean Central Volcanic Zone and the Altiplano–Puna volcanic complex are in the Western Cordillera. The Cordillera Real in the Eastern Cordillera is glaciated, while the southern Altiplano peaks are ice-free owing to the dry climate. A Palaeozoic basement underlies the Altiplano, with sediments deposited from the Cretaceous to the Pleistocene forming its surface. Uplift of the Altiplano began in the Miocene, and it became a closed basin during the late Pliocene-early Pleistocene.

The Altiplano has an arid climate. As of 2018, temperatures at 3,800 metres (12,500 ft) altitude range between 6.3–8.5 °C (43.3–47.3 °F), in 2000 evaporation rates throughout the Altiplano exceeded 1,500 millimetres per year (59 in/year). Climate varies strongly from north to south: mean temperatures and precipitation drop from 15 °C (59 °F) and 700 millimetres (28 in) in the north to about 7 °C (45 °F) and 100 millimetres (3.9 in) in the southern Lípez area, reflecting the direction of prevailing winds and the topography. Daily temperature ranges exceeding the seasonal ones, strong winds and high insolation are other aspects of the Altiplano climate. Much of the water balance in the present-day Altiplano-Atacama area is maintained by groundwater flow.

Most precipitation is recorded between October and April, when easterly winds associated with the South American Summer Monsoon transport humidity from the Amazon. They are the principal source of precipitation in the Altiplano, explaining the higher precipitation to the north. The climate of the Altiplano is usually dry when westerly winds prevail, but frontal systems can bring snowfall, mainly in winter but sometimes in summer. Because the Altiplano lies near the edge of the monsoon belt, its climate is sensitive to climate oscillations, such as the El Niño-Southern Oscillation.

Lake Titicaca is a large lake in the northern Altiplano with a surface area of 8,560 square kilometres (3,310 sq mi); it usually drains through the Rio Desaguadero to Lake Poopó. The Salar de Uyuni, at an altitude of 3,653 metres (11,985 ft) with an area of 10,000 square kilometres (3,900 sq mi), and the Salar de Coipasa, covering 2,500 square kilometres (970 sq mi) at an altitude of 3,656 metres (11,995 ft), are large salt pans. Lake Titicaca and the southern salt flats are presently two separate water basins; sills at 3,703 metres (12,149 ft) and 3,672 metres (12,047 ft) altitude separate Poopó from Coipasa and Coipasa from Uyuni, respectively. The divide between Coipasa and Uyuni is only a few metres high. Channels, for example the Rio Laca Jahuira between Poopó and Coipasa, indicate the past connections between lakes; water levels exceeding 3,700 metres (12,100 ft) result in the formation of a waterbody spanning Poopó, Coipasa and Uyuni. Sometimes during wet years, like 1986, the salt flats fill with water and become partially connected.

=== Geography ===
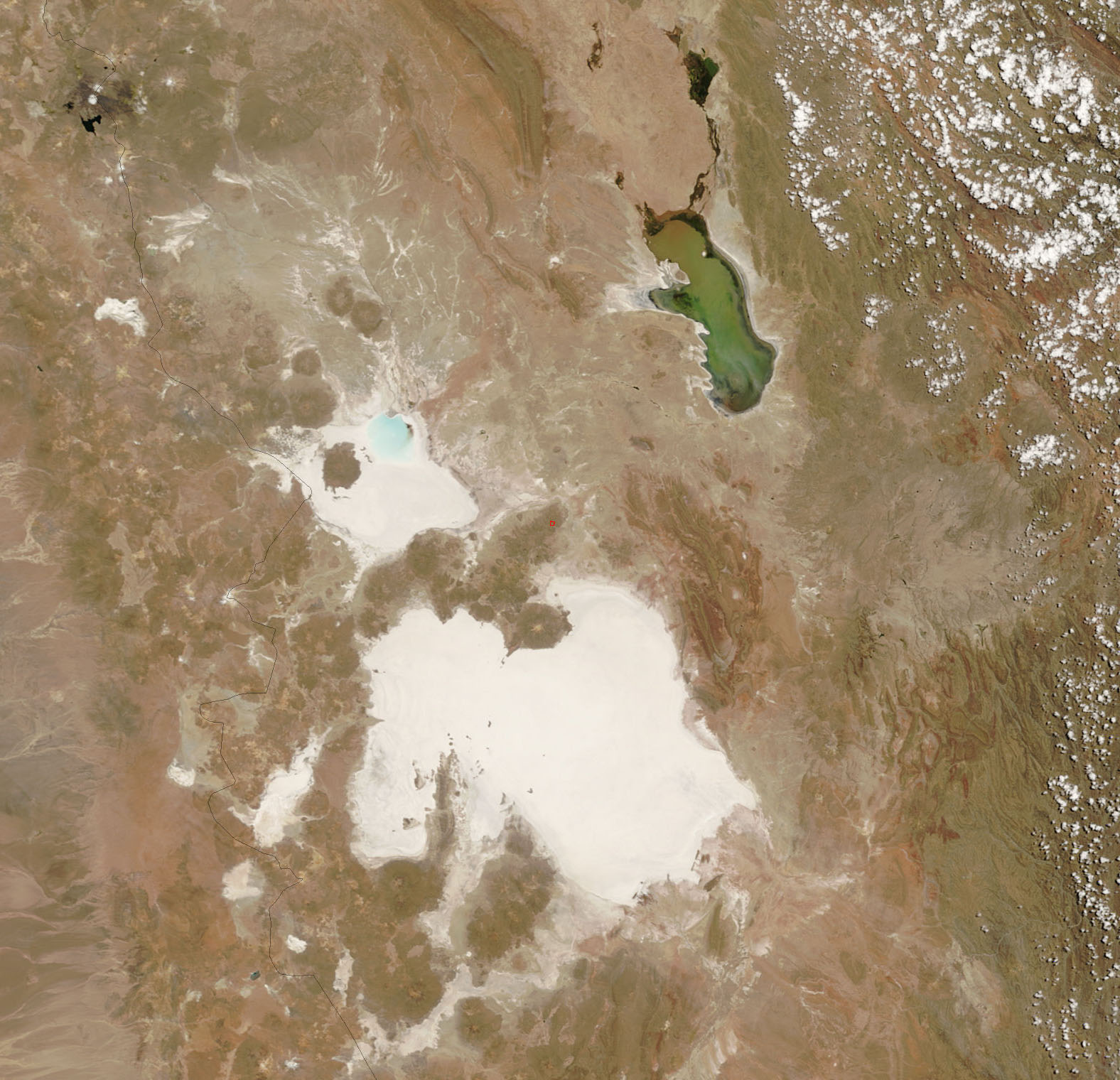
The basin of Lake Poopó (upper right), Salar de Uyuni (white beneath centre) and Salar de Coipasa (white left of centre)

At its maximum extent, Lake Tauca was larger than Lake Titicaca: it stretched for over 600 kilometres (370 mi) and flooded the basins now occupied by Lake Poopó, Salar de Uyuni and Salar de Coipasa. It was the Altiplano's largest palaeolake during the last 100,000-130,000 years, comparable in size to present-day Lake Michigan. Tauca was one of many lakes which formed around the world during glacial epochs; others include the Baltic Ice Lake in Europe and Lake Missoula in North America, although most of them formed behind ice dams.

Water depths reached 110–120 metres (360–390 ft), corresponding to an altitude of about 3,770 metres (12,370 ft) above sea level. Disagreement about water levels at different sites may reflect uneven uplift of the lake bed after the lake disappeared, or neotectonic processes. Minor water-level fluctuations occurred during the lake's existence.

Lake Tauca and earlier lake cycles flooded the basins now occupied by Lake Poopó and several salt flats, including Uyuni, Coipasa, Empexa, Laguani and Carcote. Water reached depths of several tens of metres in some areas. Salar de Ascotán may or may not have been part of Lake Tauca, while Lake Titicaca was never contiguous with any Altiplano lake. Long embayments extended into the surrounding landscape (e.g at Salar de Ascotan, Salar de Empexa, Salar de Laguani and the Desaguadero valley to Nejapa), and several mountains formed peninsulas or islands in Lake Tauca. The ridge that separates the Salar de Uyuni and Salar de Coipasa formed a peninsula; San Agustín, San Cristóbal and Colcha were islands. The present-day cities of Challapata, Oruro and Uyuni are located in areas inundated by Lake Tauca. Muddy (Note: The sedimentation rate in the Uyuni basin was about 1.6–2 millimetres per year (0.063–0.079 in/year).) deposits formed in the deeper lake basins like Uyuni. The terrain above 3,800 metres (12,500 ft) was affected by glaciation, and glacial outwash reached the lakeshore.

The shores of Lake Tauca and earlier lake cycles featured beach ridges, erosional benches, fan deltas and reefs. Lake sediments formed gravel and ooid beaches, mudflats, sandy deposits and tufa structures. Some caves along the shores were flooded. Volcanic eruptions affected Lake Tauca; the Chita tuff fell in the lake approximately 15,650 years BP, when the lake may have been regressing, and the debris avalanche from the Tata Sabaya volcano rolled over terraces left by Lake Tauca.

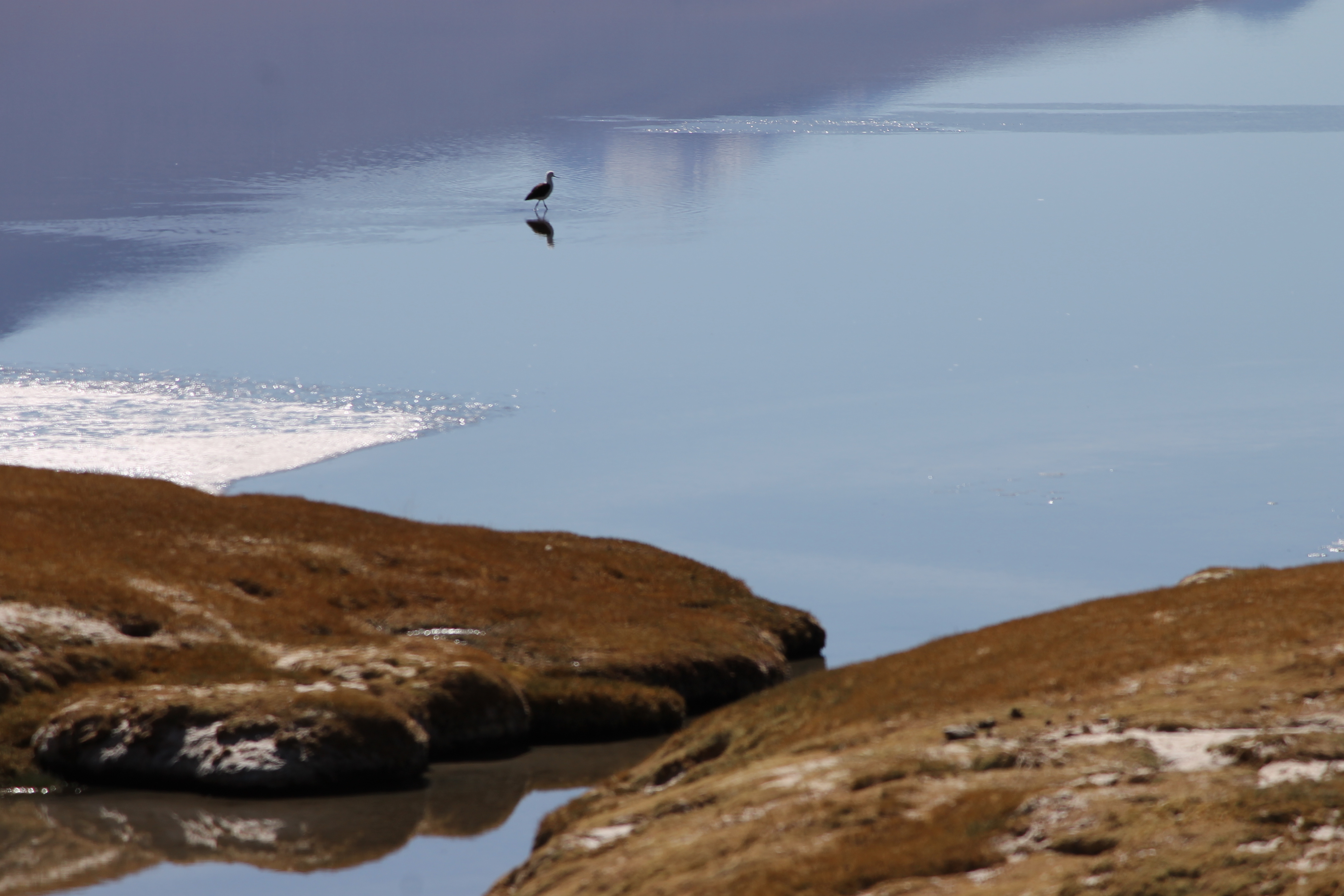
Salar de Ascotan

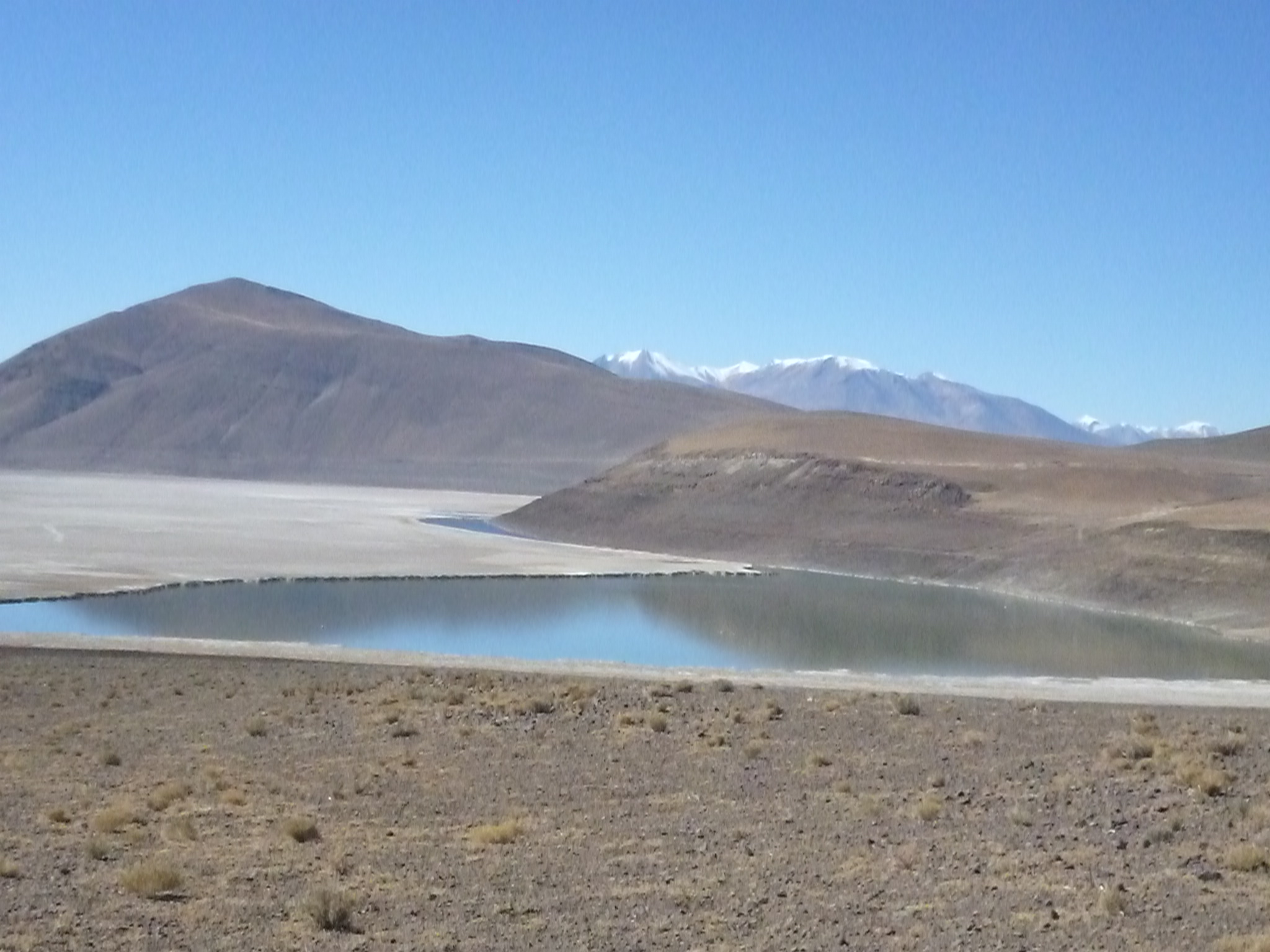
Salar de Carcote

The course of the Lauca River

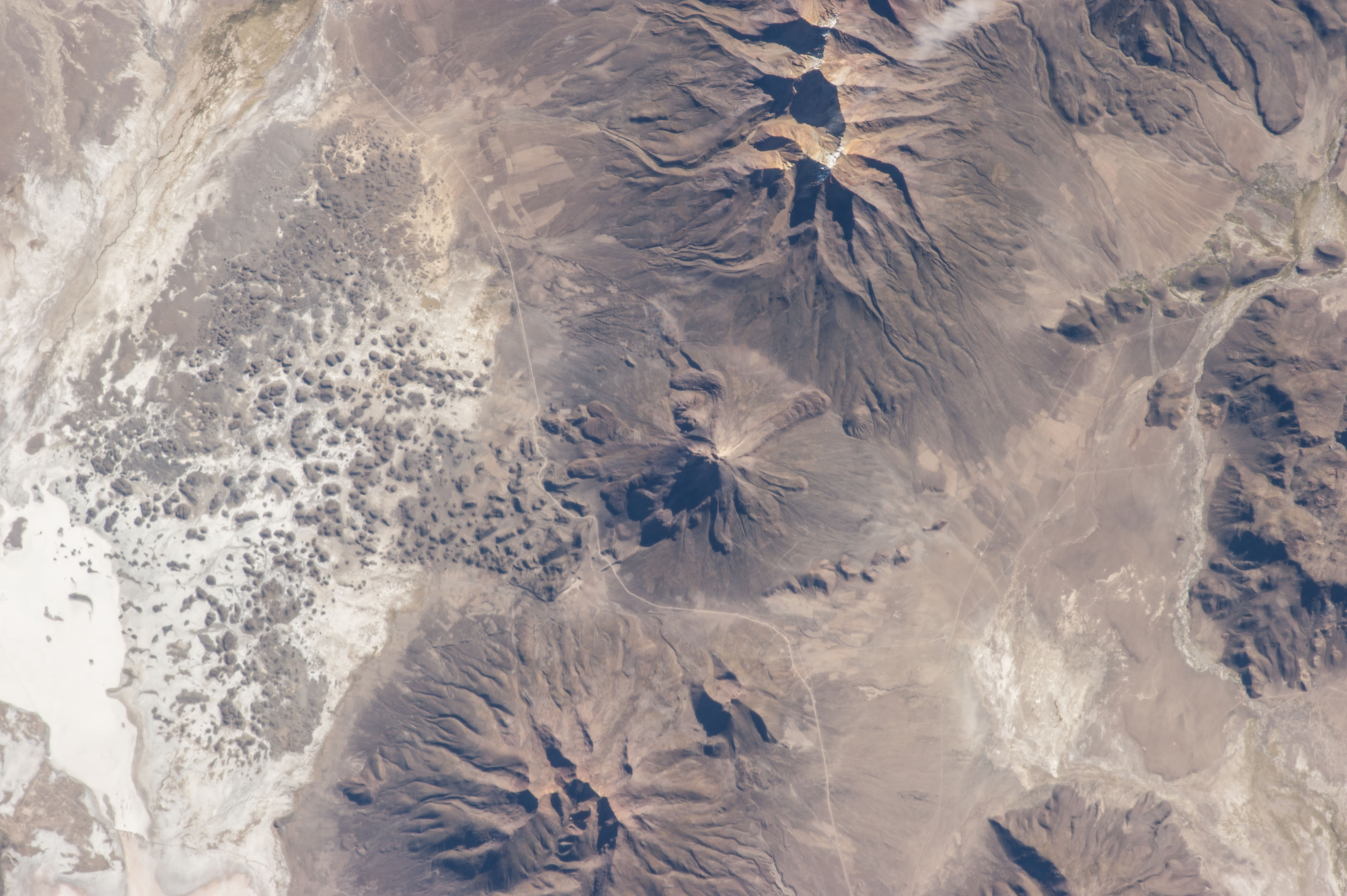
Tata Sabaya with the landslide to the left

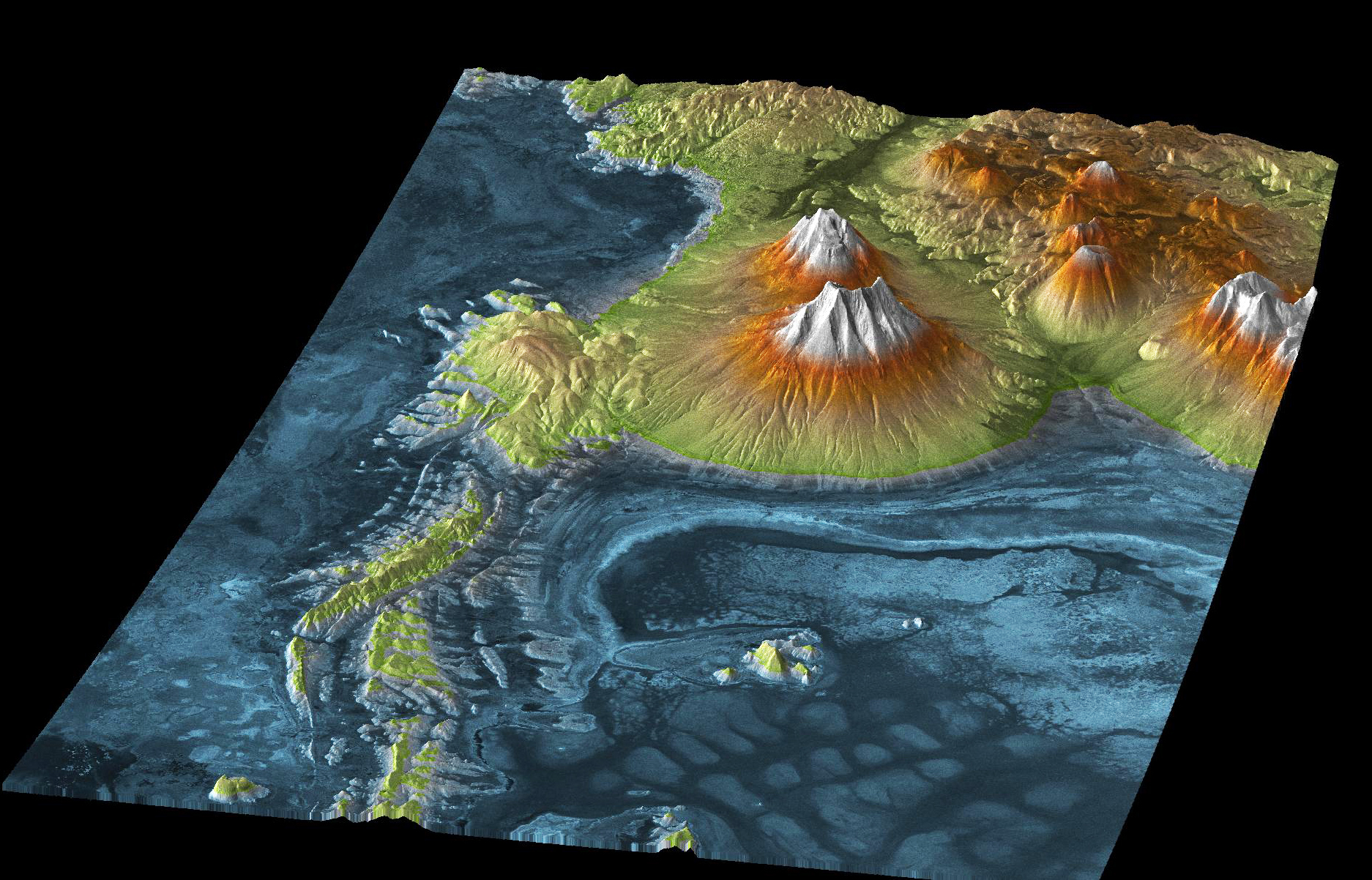
3D geography of Salar de Uyuni, remainder of Lake Tauca

A later phase in lake levels (known as the Ticaña phase) was lower, at 3,657 metres (11,998 ft); the drop from Tauca was abrupt. The late phase of Lake Tauca, named "Coipasa", had a water level of 3,660 metres (12,010 ft) or 3,700 metres (12,100 ft) and covered an area of about 32,000 square kilometres (12,000 sq mi). The connection between the Poopó and Coipasa basins narrowed and large islands formed in the southwestern Uyuni and between the Uyuni and Coipasa basins, which were still connected at Salinas de Garci Mendoza and Llica.

==== Alternative estimates ====
Published estimates of Lake Tauca's maximum area:

Surface (1000 km²)	Surface (1000 sq mi)	Details	Date of estimate
43	17		1981
80	31	Possibly triggered by a large spillover from Lake Titicaca, 13,000 years ago	1995
33–60	13–23		2006
50	19		2009
52	20	At a 3,775 m (12,385 ft) water level	2011
48	19	Around 12,000 BP, and extending towards the Lípez area	2012
55	21		2013
56.7	21.9		2013

Published estimates of maximum lake level	Date of estimate
3,760 m (12,340 ft)	2002, 1995
3,770 m (12,370 ft)	2013
3,780 m (12,400 ft)	2001, 2006
3,790 m (12,430 ft)	2013
Almost 3,800 m (12,500 ft)	2005

=== Hydrology ===
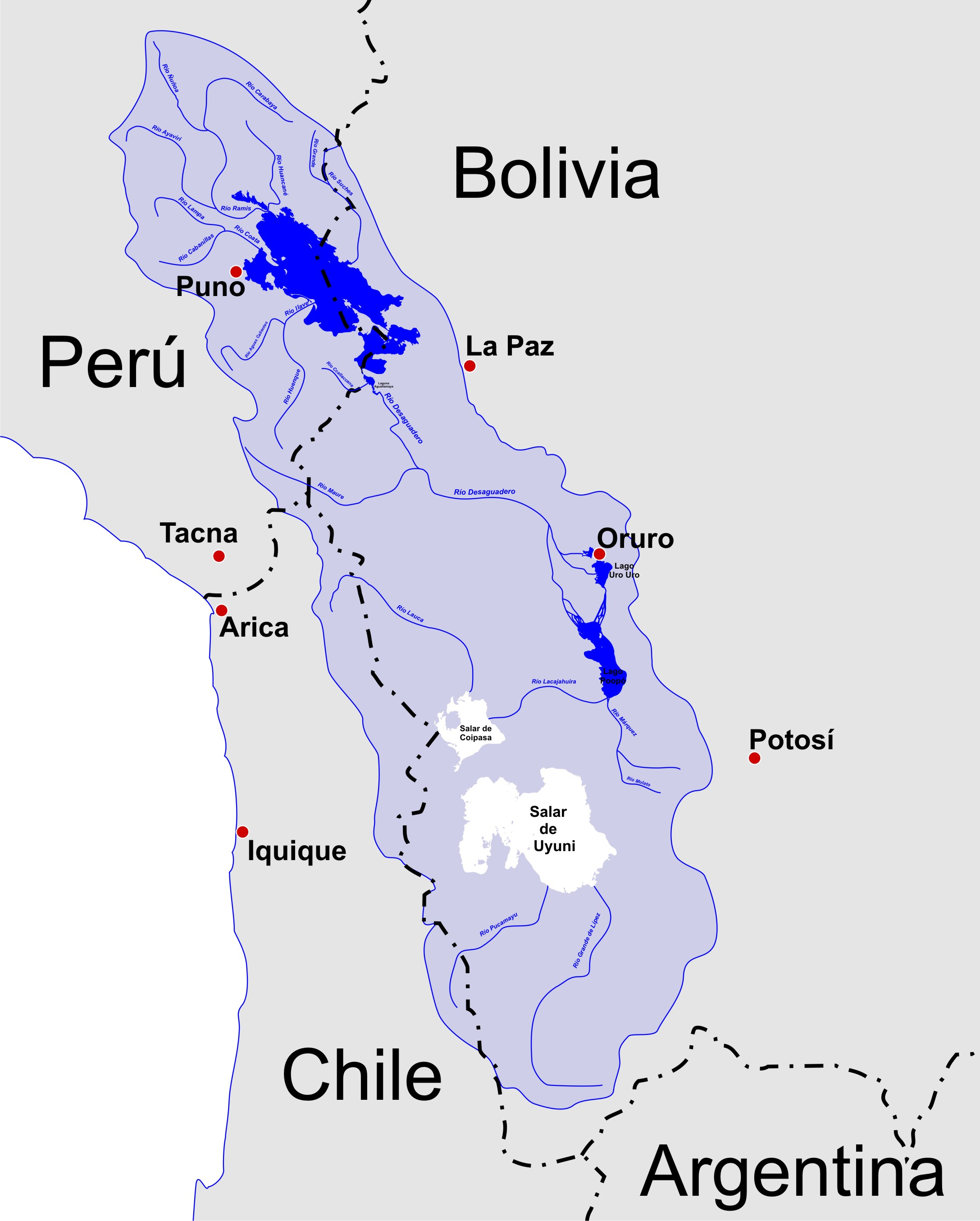
Drainage basin of the Altiplano

Estimates of Lake Tauca's volume range from 1,200 cubic kilometres (290 cu mi) at a water level of 3,720 metres (12,200 ft) to 3,810 cubic kilometres (910 cu mi) at 3,760 metres (12,340 ft). The lake may have reached such volumes within a few centuries. The quantity of water was sufficient to depress the underlying bedrock, which rebounded after the lake disappeared, leaving altitude differences of 10 to 20 metres (33 to 66 ft) in the shorelines. Carbonate oxygen-isotope measurements suggest that Lake Tauca's water was cold, generally ranging from a few degrees above freezing to about 10 °C (50 °F). Despite these low temperatures, the water may have been warmer than the surrounding land, as is the case with present-day Lake Titicaca. The area of Lake Tauca was large enough to influence the climate of the surrounding land, increasing air humidity (Note: The humidity above the lake has been estimated at 60%, taking into account the oxygen-18 content of carbonates deposited by the lake.) and precipitation in and around the lake.

The lake was deep and saline, with salinity increasing from the Tauca to the Coipasa stages. Salt was predominantly sodium chloride (Note: A significant excess NaCl concentration has been inferred for Lake Tauca, possibly stemming from older salt deposits being re-dissolved in Lake Tauca.) and (Note: Precipitation of calcium carbonate resulted in lake waters becoming progressively enriched in more soluble salts such as sulfate and chloride.) sodium sulfate.

Estimated concentrations of dissolved substances in Lake Tauca at a water level of 3,720 metres (12,200 ft)	Comment	Source
20 g/L (0.00072 lb/cu in)		
30 to 40 g/L (0.0011 to 0.0014 lb/cu in)	The earlier estimate may be incorrect; many salinity values came from marginal deposits, which tend to be less saline.	
60 to 90 g/L (0.0022 to 0.0033 lb/cu in)	Later research	

Estimated concentrations of selected dissolved salts and elements (for a 3,720 metres (12,200 ft) lake level)::

Mineral	Concentration	Source
Sodium chloride	73 g/L (0.0026 lb/cu in)	
Chlorine	54 g/L (0.0020 lb/cu in)	
Sodium	32 g/L (0.0012 lb/cu in)	
Sulfate	8.5 g/L (0.00031 lb/cu in)	
Magnesium	3 g/L (0.00011 lb/cu in)	
Potassium	2.2 g/L (7.9×10^{−5} lb/cu in)	
Calcium	1 g/L (3.6×10^{−5} lb/cu in)	
Boron	60 mg/L (2.2×10^{−6} lb/cu in)	
Lithium	10 mg/L (3.6×10^{−7} lb/cu in) or 80 mg/L (2.9×10^{−6} lb/cu in)	and
Bromine	1.6 ± 0.4 mg/L (5.8×10^{−8} ± 1.4×10^{−8} lb/cu in)	

Tauca was fed by the Desaguadero (Note: Which was occasionally dammed by sediments, forming lakes upstream.) from the north, Río Grande de Lipez on the south, the Río Lauca on the northwest and the glaciers of the two cordilleras on the east and west. The lake's total drainage basin has been estimated at 200,000 square kilometres (77,000 sq mi). Published estimates of Lake Titicaca's contribution vary widely. Strontium-isotope work suggests a large contribution (Note: Between 70% and 83% of Lake Tauca's water, an increase of between 8 and 30 times the current outflow of Lake Titicaca via the Desaguadero. A drop in the level of Lake Titicaca about 11,500 BP may have resulted in its outflow drying up, favouring the disappearance of Lake Tauca.) via the Rio Desaguadero, while other studies argue that Titicaca's outflow could not (Note: Other estimates assume that one-third of Tauca's water came from Lake Titicaca, no more than 15%, or 4% (similar to today's five-per cent contribution from Titicaca to Lake Poopó). During the Coipasa cycle, Lake Poopó may have contributed about 13% of the water. About 53% of Lake Tauca's water came from the Eastern Cordillera.) have supplied most of Tauca's water. Earlier theories emphasised glacial meltwater, but increased precipitation and/or reduced evaporation are now (Note: Complete glacier melt would need to occur in less than about a century and would not suffice to produce Lake Tauca's high water levels.) considered necessary to form lakes of Tauca's size even if a contribution of meltwater cannot be discounted completely.

Being a closed lake, water left Lake Tauca through evaporation. The evaporation rate has been estimated at over 70,000,000,000 cubic metres per year (2.5×10^{12} ft^{3}/a) (Note: Based on a 60,000-square-kilometre (23,000 sq mi) surface area.)—comparable to the discharges of the Nile or Rhine— of which a fraction (less than half) returned to the lake through precipitation. The lake waters fed aquifers, such as at Quebrada Puripica northeast of Laguna Miscanti and present-day aquifers in the Altiplano. If lake levels reached an altitude of 3,830 metres (12,570 ft), which is however unlikely, the lake may have drained into the Pilcomayo River and from there through the Río de la Plata into the Atlantic Ocean. The existence of a former outlet into the Pacific Ocean close to Salar de Ascotán that was eventually obstructed by lava flows is also improbable. A 1985 proposal that an Altiplano-wide lake catastrophically drained into the Rio Beni during the Holocene has received little support.

Strontium-isotope evidence suggests that little water may have passed between the Uyuni and Coipasa basins. During the Coipasa phase, the combined Coipasa–Uyuni basin was connected only weakly to the Poopó basin given the height of the sill between the two basins and evidence found at Poopó, although water may have flowed from the former into the latter.

Lake Tauca left lake sediments up to 5 metres (16 ft) thick in the southern Altiplano, adding to the sediments left by older lakes. These rocks contain amphibole, clay minerals (including illite, kaolinite and smectite), feldspar, plagioclase, potassium feldspar, pyroxene and quartz. In their composition the rocks resemble Altiplano soils.

=== Biology ===
Vegetation during the Last Glacial Maximum

Aquatic plants grew in Lake Tauca when temperature, substrate conditions and depth allowed. Common taxa include characeae, Myriophyllum, Isoetes (indicating the formation of littoral communities) and Pediastrum. Algae and diatoms (Note: The lake was deep enough to support planktonic diatoms, including the dominant Cyclotella choctawatcheeana. Other diatoms noted in Lake Tauca are the shallow-water Discostella stelligera, benthic Achnanthes brevipes and Denticula subtilis, the epiphytic Achnanthes brevipes, Cocconeis placentula and Rhopalodia gibberula, the planktonic Cyclotella striata, the tychoplanktonic Fragilaria atomus, Fragilaria construens, Fragilaria pinnata, Pseudostaurosira brevistriata and Staurosirella pinnata, Melosira sulcata in river mouths, and Achnanthes breviceps, Amphora coffeaeformis, Anomoeoneis sp., Chaetoceros sp., Gyrosigma sp., Diploneis smithii, Mastoglia elliptica, Melosira moniliformis, Navicula sp., Nitzscia punctata, Rhopalodia musculus, Surirella sp. and Synedra tabulate whose preferred positions in the water column are not stated. Epithemia has also been found.) lived in the lake. Rocks and shoreline sediments contain fossils of brine shrimp, gastropods like Biomphalaria, Littoridina and Succineidae snails, molluscs (occasionally forming coquina sediments) such as Pisidium clams, and ostracods.

Algae and to a lesser degree stromatolite-forming microbes (Note: Phormidium encrustatum and Rivularia species) produced carbonate bioherms (reef-like knolls) in the lake and along its shorelines, forming complex reefs about 300 kilometres (190 mi) long.

The bioherms range from thin crusts on exposed surfaces to large, mushroom-shaped or domed mounds, some resembling barrier reefs. Individual domes can reach 4 metres (13 ft) across and occur on former lake terraces. They developed around objects jutting from the surface, such as rocks. Tube- and tuft-shaped structures also appear on these domes. Some bioherms developed over several lake cycles, persisting through fluctuations in water level. Similar structures have been documented elsewhere, including in Germany's Ries crater. The algal taxa that build the bioherms of Lake Tauca are hard to identify, but Chara species have been recognized. The water above the tufa deposits was probably less than 20 metres (66 ft) deep.

During humid periods when lakes formed in the Altiplano, grasslands and woodlands dominated the vegetation of the region. Polylepis may have been more widespread than it is today under the climatic and salinity conditions of Lake Tauca, although it was less widespread than during some earlier lake cycles. This difference may reflect less favourable conditions for the plant or poorer preservation of its pollen in the sediments of the deeper lake. Peak Polylepis and Acaena spread tends to occur during climates that are intermediate between full glacial and interglacial ones.

== Research history ==
Reports of ancient lake deposits on the Altiplano go back to 1861. In 1882, John B. Minchin reported encrustations around Lake Poopó and the salars south of Coipasa. He proposed that a lake with an area of about 120,000 square kilometres (46,000 sq mi) left these encrustations, and that nitrate deposits in the Atacama and Tarapaca were formed from water draining from this lake. Some estimates of lake size claimed that it reached from Lake Titicaca as far as 27° S. In 1906, Steinmann called the lake covering the Poopó–Coipasa basins 'Lake Reck' and coined the name 'Lake Minchin' for the Uyuni basin, in honour of Minchin.

Subsequent research established that Lake Titicaca was not part of Lake Minchin. Researchers proposed that glacial meltwater had helped form the lake, while a separate highstand encompassing Lake Titicaca was named Lake Ballivian. The lake cycles "Escara" and "Tauca" were first defined in 1978 and their names match these of locations where corresponding geological formations were identified; the initial definition of Lake Tauca was the waterbody with a shoreline at 3,720 metres (12,200 ft) elevation above sea level. Lakes Tauca and Minchin have been considered the same lake system and called Lake Pocoyu, after the present-day lakes in the area. The relationship between various deposits in the southern Altiplano and these around Lake Titicaca was unclear at the beginning of the research history. Researchers now reconstruct the former lakes using evidence from shore terraces, sediments, bioherms and drill cores.

== Predecessor lakes ==
Before Lake Tauca, there were Ouki (Note: It and Tauca are the only ones known with water levels exceeding 3,720 metres (12,200 ft) above sea level.) (120,000–98,000 years ago), Salinas (95,000–80,000 years ago), Inca Huasi (about 46,000 years ago) and Sajsi (Note: The Sajsi lake cycle preceded the Tauca phase by one or two millennia - in which case it coincided with a water level rise in Lake Huinaymarca (Lake Titicaca's southern basin) - and featured water levels 100 metres (330 ft) lower. It is sometimes considered an earlier stage of Lake Tauca.) (24,000–20,500 years ago, during the Last Glacial Maximum). A trend towards deeper palaeolakes in the southern Altiplano during the Pleistocene contrasts with a decreasing trend in the level of Lake Titicaca. This pattern probably occurred because the threshold between the two basins progressively eroded, allowing more water from Titicaca to flow into the southern Altiplano.

The names and dates assigned to these palaeolakes are not consistent across studies. Some researchers treat Inca Huasi and Minchin as the same phase, while others distinguish an earlier 'pre-Minchin' lake. Other interpretations divide Minchin or Ouki into several separate lake cycles, or treat the Coipasa phase as distinct from Lake Tauca.

=== Preceding lake: Escara ===
Escara was identified in the central Altiplano, and it may be the oldest Altiplano lake cycle. Lake levels reached an altitude of 3,780 metres (12,400 ft); and the lake may have been comparable in size to Lake Tauca and Ouki. This cycle left 8 metres (26 ft) thick deposits at the town of Escara.

Tuffs dated to 1.87 million years and 191,000 years ago have been identified in the deposits of Lake Escara. The latter date is commonly cited as the age of Lake Escara but is considered questionable. The L5 sediment and S10 salt layers in Salar de Uyuni have been linked to Escara. At roughly the same time as Lake Escara, an extended Lake Titicaca (Lake Ballivian) may have covered parts of the northern Altiplano.

=== Hypothetical pluvial and lake: Minchin ===
A humid period 46,000–36,000 years ago led to the formation of a lake in the Altiplano, which like the humid period itself is named "Lake Minchin"; the lake formed in the same area as Lake Tauca. Their relative size is uncertain but Minchin was probably the smaller lake. Earlier papers regarded Lake Minchin as larger than Lake Tauca, due to incorrect attribution of shorelines: A shoreline at 3,760 metres (12,340 ft) was attributed to Lake Minchin until dating established that it formed during the Tauca phase 13,790 BP.

The name 'Lake Minchin' has been applied to several different things—sometimes for a specific palaeolake, sometimes for a time period, sometimes for the highest lake level, sometimes for sediment formations, or the entire late Pleistocene lake system in the Altiplano. An alternative theory postulates that "Lake Minchin" is actually several lake stages, including Ouki and Inca Huasi, that were conflated due to unreliable radiocarbon dates. Sometimes the term "Minchin" is also applied to the whole hydrological system Titicaca-Rio Desaguadero-Lake Poopó-Salar de Coipasa-Salar de Uyuni, or to the highest ancient lake in the Altiplano (usually known as Lake Tauca). There are also contradictions between lake level records in different parts of the system. This confusion has led to calls to drop the usage of the name "Minchin".

The S4 layer in Salar de Uyuni drill cores has been linked to Lake Minchin. The same broad period saw increased moisture in the Brazilian and Bolivian Amazon and the formation of lakes at Laguna Pozuelos, in landslide-dammed valleys of northwestern Argentina, and in Bolivia's Lípez region. Some of these lakes developed bioherms and stromatolites. Increased sedimentation took place in river valleys, forming for example the "Minchin Terrace" in the Pisco River valley. The Lake Minchin phase coincided with global cooling and glacier advances across the southern Altiplano and Puna. Evidence includes the N-III moraines at Choquelimpie, the Canabaya glaciation in the Cordillera Apolobamba and the Choqueyapu I advance in the Eastern Cordillera.

== Chronology ==
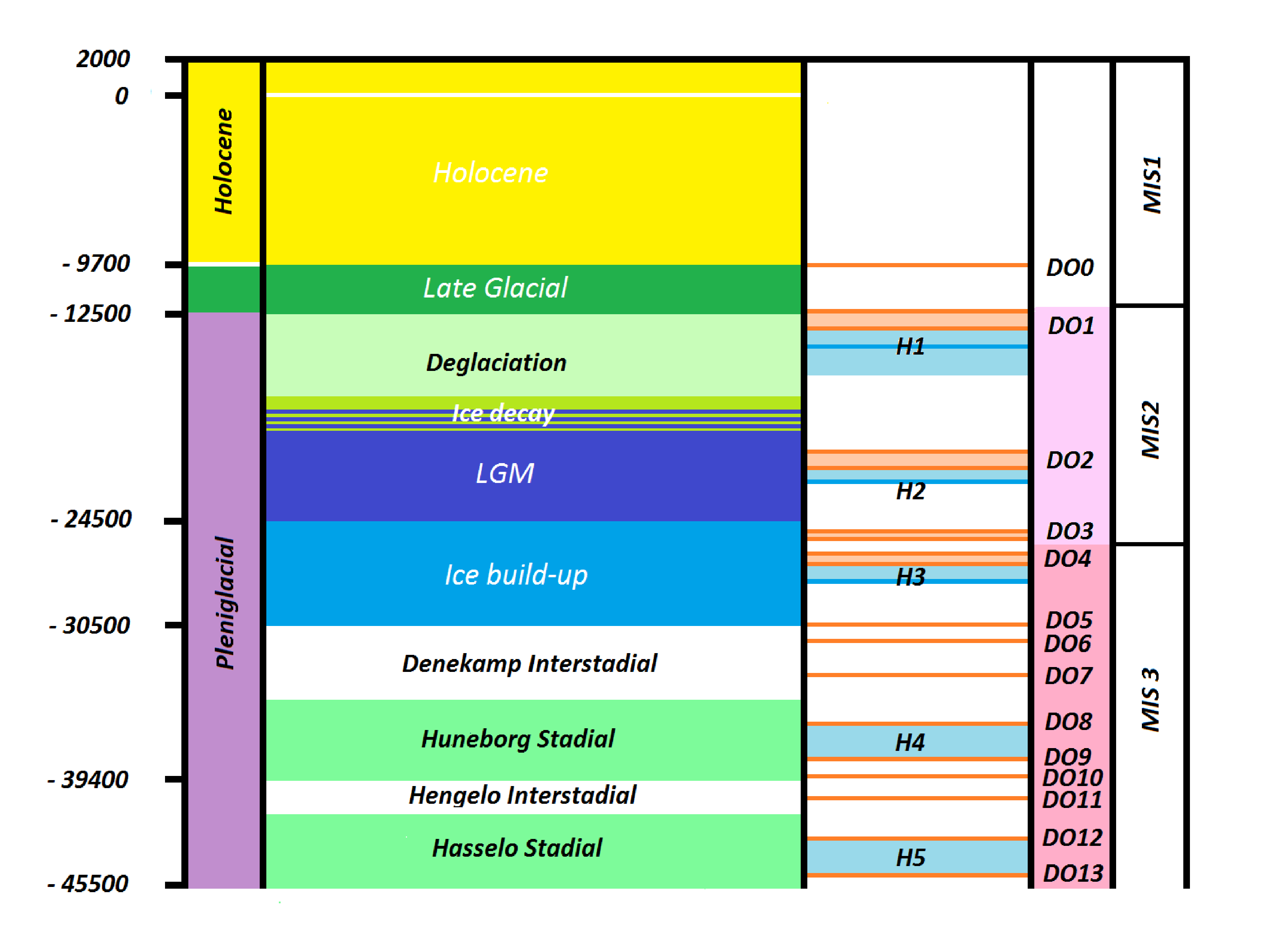
Subdivision and glacial history of the latest Pleistocene and early Holocene Europe

The existence of Lake Tauca was preceded by a dry period, with minor lake events recorded in Salar de Uyuni in the Late Pleistocene at 28,200–30,800 and 31,800–33,400 BP. The era may have been drier than the present; ice had disappeared from Nevado Sajama and the Amazon rainforest had retreated. A dry period is also noted in Africa and other parts of South America around 18,000 BP. The drying of earlier lake cycles had left carbonate and salt deposits, including an about 20 metres (66 ft) thick salt layer in the Salar de Uyuni.

Water levels began to rise around 18,000 years ago and reached their peak 16,500 years ago. This highstand, which is named the "Tauca" stage, continued until 15,500 years ago. The levels decreased between 14,500 and 13,500 years ago, marking the "Ticaña" stage. There was a drop of 100-metre (330 ft) and Lake Tauca disconnected from Lake Titicaca as water levels in the Huiñaimarca basin of Lake Titicaca decreased. The drying of Lake Tauca during the Ticaña lowstand has been linked to the Bølling–Allerød and Antarctic Cold Reversal climate oscillations. Transitions between lake phases occurred in timespans of no more than a millennium.

The Coipasa phase commenced about 13,300 years ago and reached its peak between 12,900 and 11,800 years ago. Lake Tauca was smaller during the Coipasa phase than during the Tauca proper, reaching only 3,720 metres (12,200 ft) altitude. Two highstands, correlated to the Tauca and Coipasa stages, are also observed at Salar de Atacama. After the Coipasa phase, water levels decreased between 11,800 and 10,200 years ago. Further drying during the Holocene was gradual. A later dry period lasted from about 8,500 to 3,600 years before present and was particularly intense between 7,200 and 6,700 years ago. Some evidence, however, suggests that a wetter interval occurred within the broader period between 10,600 and 3,200 years ago.

Published radiometric ages span a wide range (72,600–7,200 BP), reflecting differences in dating methods and the deposits (Note: Crusts containing calcite, gastropod shells, stromatolites and structures left behind by algae.) being dated. Scatter in ages obtained by radiometric dating can yield misleadingly long durations for lake stands, but the structure of the shorelines imply that they last longer than a century. Water level fluctuations took place within less than a thousand years.

=== Scenarios through research history ===
The first research, by Servant and Fontes in 1978, indicated a lake age between 12,500 and 11,000 BP according to radiocarbon dating. These were bracketed by dates between 12,360 ± 120 and 10,640 ± 280 BP for the highest deposits at Salar de Coipasa and Salar de Uyuni, and 10,020 ± 160 and 10,380 ± 180 BP for deposits which formed shortly before the lake dried. The reliability of the dates was questioned by Geoffrey O. Seltzer in 1990, and a later estimate was set at 13,000 to 10,000 BP. In 1990, Rondeau proposed ages of 14,100 to 11,000 BP based on radiocarbon dating and 7,000 to 14,800 BP based on uranium-thorium dating.

In 1993 it was suggested that Lake Tauca had an earlier phase, with water levels reaching 3,740 metres (12,270 ft), and a later phase reaching 3,720 metres (12,200 ft). Research published in 1995 suggested that the lake remained shallow for over a millennium before rising to, and stabilising at, its maximum level. Water levels between 13,900 and 11,500 BP reached 3,720 metres (12,200 ft); 3,740 metres (12,270 ft) was reached between 12,475 and 11,540 BP, and 3,760 to 3,770 metres (12,340 to 12,370 ft) between 12,200 and 11,500 BP.

Research in 1999 indicated an earlier start of the Tauca lake cycle, which was subdivided into three phases and several sub-phases. Around 15,438 ± 80 BP (the Tauca Ia phase), water levels in Salar de Uyuni were 4 metres (13 ft) higher than the current salt crust. Lake levels then rose to 27 metres (89 ft) above the salt flat, accompanied by freshwater input (Tauca Ib). Around 13,530 ± 50 BP (Tauca II), the lake reached an altitude of 3,693 metres (12,116 ft) but no higher than 3,700 metres (12,100 ft). Between 13,000 and 12,000 BP, the lake reached its greatest depth—110 metres (360 ft)—of the Tauca III period. Dates of 15,070 BP and 15,330 BP were obtained for the highest shoreline, at 3,760 metres (12,340 ft). After 12,000 BP, water levels decreased abruptly by 100 metres (330 ft). An even-earlier start was proposed by 2001 research, based on sediments in the Uyuni basin, which determined that Lake Tauca began developing 26,100 BP. A 2001 review indicated that most radiometric dates for Lake Tauca cluster between 16,000 and 12,000 BP, with lake levels peaking around 16,000 BP. A 2005 book estimated the duration of the Lake Tauca phase at between 15,000 and 10,500 BP.

Research in 2006 postulated that the Lake Tauca transgression began 17,850 BP and peaked at altitudes of 3,765 to 3,790 metres (12,352 to 12,434 ft) between 16,400 and 14,100 years ago. Spillovers into neighbouring basins may have stabilized the lake levels at that point, and the level subsequently dropped over a 300-year period. The following Coipasa phase ended around 11,040 +120/-440 BP, but its chronology is uncertain.

A 2011 lake history study had the ascent of lake levels start 18,500 years ago. Levels rose slowly to 3,670 metres (12,040 ft) 17,500 years ago, before accelerating to 3,760 metres (12,340 ft) by 16,000 years ago. Contradictions between lake depths determined by shorelines and diatom-fossil analysis led to two lake-level-rise chronologies: one reaching 3,700 metres (12,100 ft) 17,000 years ago and the other reaching 3,690 metres (12,110 ft) between 17,500 and 15,000 years ago. The lake level would have peaked from 16,000 to 14,500 years ago at 3,765 to 3,775 metres (12,352 to 12,385 ft) altitude. Shortly before 14,200 BP, the lake level would have begun its drop to 3,660 metres (12,010 ft) by 13,800 BP. The Coipasa phase began before 13,300 BP and reached its peak at 3,700 metres (12,100 ft) 12,500 years ago. The Coipasa lake's regression was nearly complete around 11,500 years ago. A 2013 reconstruction envisaged a lake level rise between 18,000–16,500 years BP, followed by a highstand between 16,500–15,500 and a decrease in lake levels between 14,500–13,500 years BP.

== Causes ==
The formation and disappearance of Lake Tauca was a major hydrological event. Its formation, along with the later Coipasa phase, is associated with the Central Andean Pluvial Event (CAPE) as precipitation increased between 18° and 25° degrees south for several millennia. The CAPE is often subdivided into two stages. The first was wetter and begins in the late glacial (17,500-15,900 years ago); the second is drier and continued into the early Holocene (until 9,700-8,500 years ago). Published start and end dates vary by study and in some places it may have lasted past 8,500 years ago. CAPE I coincided with the main Tauca stage, CAPE II with the Coipasa stage and the dry period separating them with the Ticaña lowstand. The second stage of the Central Andean Pluvial Event has been subdivided further into a wetter earlier and a drier later substage. The two lake phases also differed in their moisture sources and seasonal rainfall: The Tauca cycle had a simultaneous increase of summer and winter precipitation and a northerly moisture source; during the Coipasa lake cycle only summer precipitation increased and had a more southerly origin (from the Gran Chaco). The Central Andean Pluvial Event may not have been synchronous between the southern Altiplano and the southern and northern Atacama. There were no major century-scale precipitation changes during the Tauca period.

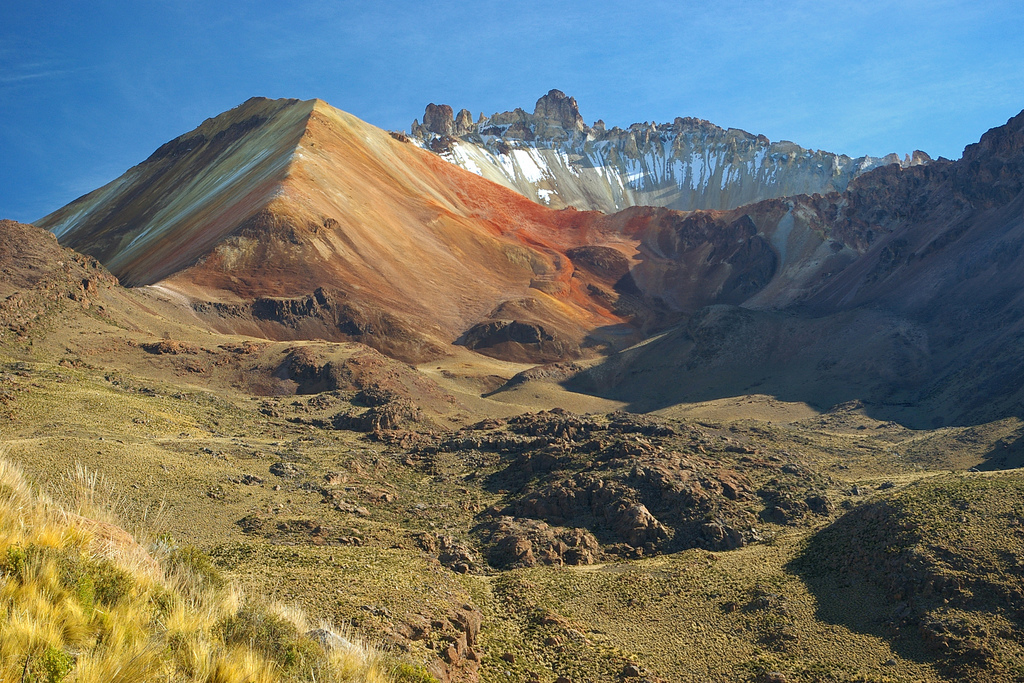
The Tunupa volcano was glaciated during the Tauca episode

Several hypotheses link Lake Tauca's formation to changes in atmospheric circulation during Heinrich event 1, a period of North Atlantic cooling. A weakening of the Atlantic Meridional Overturning Circulation may have reduced the ocean's transport of heat across the equator, shifting the ITCZ southward and strengthening the South American summer monsoon. Condensational heating in the monsoon strengthened the Bolivian High (Note: The Bolivian high is an anticyclone which steers moist air onto the Altiplano.) and shifted it southward, increasing the transport of easterly moisture into the Altiplano. Earlier highstands of Altiplano lakes may also correlate to earlier Heinrich events, although not all Heinrich events led to lake expansions. The Younger Dryas has been linked to the Coipasa stage and CAPE II.

Other potential mechanisms and factors:

- Increased cloud cover probably increased the effective precipitation by reducing evaporation rates.
- The lake may have contributed to increased precipitation by influencing land breezes and through evaporation, which increased precipitation in the lake centre four-fold.
- Persistent La Niña climatic conditions may have contributed to the lake's filling and the first CAPE, as well as facilitating glacier expansions.
- An intensification and southward shift of the South Atlantic Convergence Zone (Note: The South Atlantic Convergence Zone is a rainfall belt over central and southern Brazil during southern hemisphere summer.) may have contributed to the precipitation increase but not all records agree.
- Vegetation changes and lake development would have decreased the albedo of the Altiplano, resulting in warming and increased transport of moisture towards the Altiplano, but such positive feedback mechanisms were considered questionable in a 1998 study and might have been offset by larger glacier area.
- The overflow path from Lake Titicaca into the southern Altiplano was in existence for the last 50,000 years; this might explain why there is little evidence of large lakes in the southern Altiplano before that time.
- Some 20th century phases of higher water levels in Lake Titicaca have been correlated with episodes of increased snow cover on northern Hemisphere continents; an analogous process during the ice age may have taken place during the Lake Tauca cycle.
- The early Holocene humid period might be linked to the northern hemisphere pluvials forced by the Milankovich cycle or warmer sea surface temperatures in the Southeastern Pacific, which weakened the South Pacific Anticyclone.

The ideal conditions for the development of palaeolakes in the Altiplano do not appear to exist during maximum glaciation or warm interglacial periods. The role of incoming solar radiation remains disputed: some studies find no clear relationship between insolation and lake highstands, while a 2019 study linked an insolation maximum between 26,000 and 15,000 years ago to the Tauca phase. The pattern of moistening does not support a role of the southern hemisphere westerlies in the Tauca humid period. A global climatic warming and a northward shift of the monsoon occurred around 14,500 years ago, increased occurrence of El Niño and the northward shift of the ITCZ accompanied the Ticaña lowstand.

== Climate and context ==
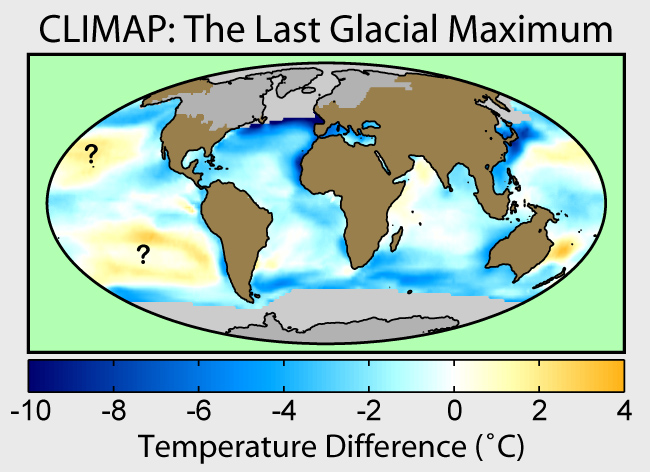
Last Glacial Maximum sea water temperature map

There are few reconstructions of how the climate looked before and after the Lake Tauca highstand, one recent (2020) estimate is of a temperature 3 °C (5.4 °F) lower than today and a mean regional precipitation of 900 millimetres per year (35 in/year) as precipitation doubled in and around the Arid Diagonal. Temperature changes were correlated to Antarctic events and precipitation changes to climate oscillations in Greenland.

Precipitation increases	Temperature decreases	Source
315 ± 45 millimetres (12.4 ± 1.8 in)	3 °C (5.4 °F)	
200 millimetres per year (7.9 in/year)	n/a	
300 millimetres per year (12 in/year)	n/a	
20-75%	5 to 7 °C (9.0 to 12.6 °F)	
130%	2.9 ± 0.2 °C (5.22 ± 0.36 °F)	
n/a	5.7 ± 1.1 °C (10.3 ± 2.0 °F)	
60-200%	6 to 7 °C (11 to 13 °F)	

=== Glaciation ===
The humid period associated with Lake Tauca coincided with changes in glacier (Note: And rock glacier) behaviour across the Andes, including slower (Note: Glaciers had already retreated from their maximum positions by the time it began.) retreat and, in some areas, (Note: The so-called 'II moraine' stage in northern Chile, and the Chacabaya/M2/M3 glaciations in the Cordillera Real and Cordillera Apolobamba may be contemporaneous with Lake Tauca.) glacier expansion. Evidence has been reported from regions between 24° S and Hualca Hualca in Peru.

The equilibrium line altitude of glaciers in the dry Andes decreased by 700 to 1,000 metres (2,300 to 3,300 ft). The correlation is most clear in southern Bolivia (Tunupa), while farther south (Tocorpuri, Llano de Chajnantor, El Tatio) evidence is less (Note: Glacial advance in the Encierro and Turbio valleys have been attributed to the Central Andean Pluvial Event, while other indicators point to dry conditions/lack of glacier advances in central Chile and the central Puna during the highstand of Lake Tauca.) clear. The Choqueyapu II glacier advance in the Eastern Cordillera may be related to the Tauca period. In the dry Altiplano, precipitation can be as important as temperature in determining glacier growth: (Note: Unlike the Eastern Cordillera where temperatures are more important.) Moisture from Lake Tauca might have enhanced glacier growth at Sajama, Tunupa (Note: Precipitation at the centre of Lake Tauca increased by 80%, delaying the retreat of glaciers in the area.) and other mountains (Note: At Tunupa and Cerro Azanaques, glaciers reached their maximum size shortly before the lake level peaked and the meltwater from their retreat probably contributed to the growth of Lake Tauca.) close to the lake. Lake Tauca may have degraded or obscured traces of older glaciations.

=== Related events ===
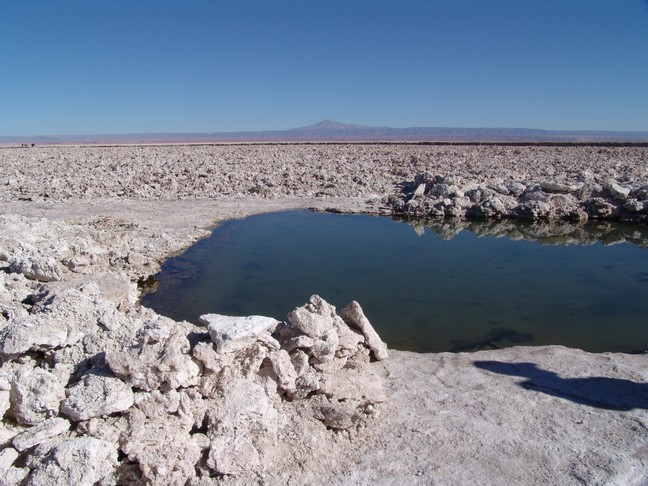
Some lake water highstands of Salar de Atacama are associated with Lake Tauca's main highstand phase

During the Tauca phase, Lake Titicaca rose to an altitude range between 3,815 metres (12,516 ft) and 3,825 metres (12,549 ft). Water level then dropped during the Ticaña phase and probably rose again during the Coipasa. The Lake Tauca highstands left terraces at the southern and eastern shores of Lake Titicaca (Note: The name "Lake Minchin" is often used for the largest lake on the Altiplano, however the highstand at the end of the Pleistocene is called Tauca.) and, together with older stages of higher water levels, formed the pampas around Titicaca. This was not the first time Lake Titicaca rose; there are Pliocene to Pleistocene lake cycles (Mataro, Cabana, Ballivian and Minchin), whose exact chronology is unknown.

River discharge increased in the Altiplano-Puna, Atacama region, the Parana basin and rivers draining into the Pacific Ocean. (Note: An increase in Pacific plankton was probably linked to increased runoff (and an increased nutrient supply) from the Andes.) Titicaca's outflow through the Rio Desaguadero may have been eight times its present volume. River terraces formed in Andean rivers during the Tauca highstand.

Lakes in the Puna and Atacama also formed or expanded during the Tauca and Coipasa stages. (Note: The associated Central Andean Pluvial Event coincided with the formation of Lake Tauca) Examples include Laguna Miscanti, Lejía Lake, Laguna de los Pozuelos and Salar de Atacama. Salt flats in these regions also flooded more frequently. In high-water levels in Salar Aguas Calientes lasted until 8,430 ± 75 BP. Evidence of higher lake levels during the Tauca period extends from Laguna Mar Chiquita in the south to Lake Junin in the north. At many lakes, these highstands left identifiable shorelines. Higher lake levels were also recorded elsewhere on the Altiplano and in Atacama areas above 3,500 metres (11,500 ft). Comparable evidence has not (Note: Salar de Llamara being one exception) been found at lower elevations.

The CAPE brought major environmental changes to the Atacama. Vegetation zones shifted to lower elevations, and new ecosystems formed. Trees (Note: Escallonia angustifolia, Morella pavonis, Schinus molle and Strombocarpa tamarugo) and shrubs (Note: Adesmia atacamensis, Atriplex, Baccharis scandens, Caesalpinia aphylla, Chenopodium petiolare, Cistanthe and Distichlis spicata) grew along rivers and groundwater discharge areas, providing habitat to animals, (Note: Birds, camelids like Lama guanicoe, and rodents like Abrocoma and Ctenomys) which either no longer occur in the Atacama or went extinct, like megafauna. (Note: Mammals like Aenocyon, deer, glyptodonts, horses like Hippidion saldiasi, Gomphotheriidae, Megatheriidae and Toxodontidae) Increased wildfire activity formed the "Pica glass" in the Atacama. Other effects included increased groundwater recharge, generating wetlands, and increased water supply from the mountains to the lowlands. The well dated record of Lake Tauca has been used to correlate climatic events elsewhere in the region.

=== Environmental consequences ===
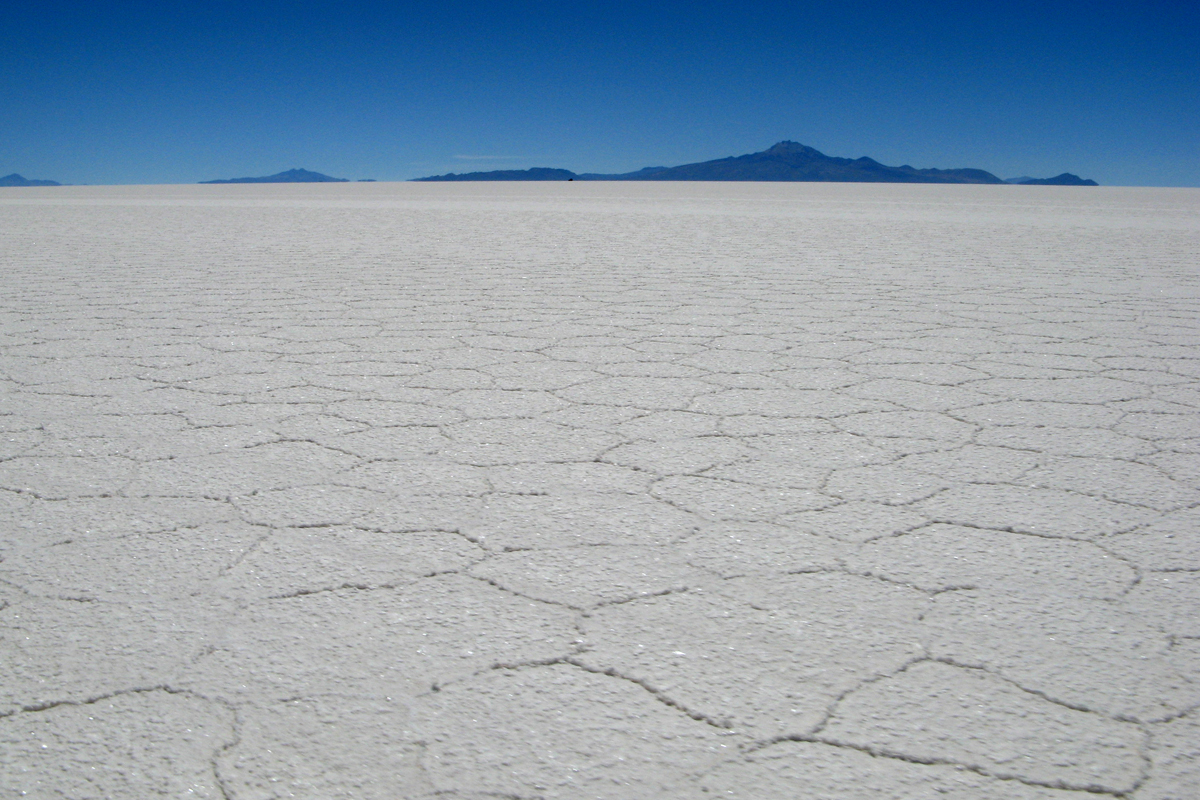
The salt deposits of Salar de Uyuni were left by the lake

Palaeoindian settlement in South America commenced during the Lake Tauca and Ticaña stages. The Viscachani culture around Lake Titicaca was contemporaneous with Lake Tauca. Human dispersal increases towards the end of the Ticaña phase, while the Coipasa phase coincides with more established settlement (including in proximity of Lake Tauca) and the establishment of regional commercial networks. The formation of oases and palaeolakes during the CAPE created more favourable conditions for the earliest settlers. The end of the lake cycle coincided with the end of an early phase of human settlement. People subsequently left parts of the desert, and the population around Salar de Atacama declined. Some Incan towers on the Altiplano were built using rocks left by Lake Tauca.

Some fossil water reserves in the dry Andes formed during the Tauca phase, the groundwater in the northern Chilean Central Valley, around Peinado in the Puna and part of the groundwater under Pampa del Tamarugal for example date back to the Lake Tauca wet phase. Lake Tauca may have supplied water to the Rio de la Plata region, sustaining life there during dry periods.

Lake Tauca left thick deposits of salts and other sediments across the southern Altiplano. At Salar de Uyuni, these deposits include salt layers up to 6 metres (20 ft) to 10 metres (33 ft) thick. Rainfall repeatedly dissolves and redeposits the salts, helping maintain the salt flat's smooth surface. The lake also altered the region's dust supply: while inundation reduced the amount of dust produced on the Altiplano, the sediments exposed as the lake dried became a new source of windblown material. Fine sediments from the former lake have also been linked to the high concentration of airborne particles in the Uyuni region. Other deposits include diatom-rich sediments and ulexite, a borate mineral.

The taxonomic similarity between fish species of the genus Orestias in Lauca National Park and Salar de Carcote has been attributed to these watersheds' being part of Lake Tauca; in general the evolution of these fish was heavily influenced by the various lake cycles. The drying of the ancient lakes would have fragmented amphibians' habitats, generating separate populations; a similar process affected plants and animals during the lakes' existence.

=== Altiplanos and palaeolakes in Latin America ===
Latin America	Valley of Mexico	Altiplano Cundiboyacense	Altiplano Boliviano
Palaeolake	Lake Texcoco	Lake Humboldt	Lake Tauca
Human occupation (yr BP)	11,100 - Tocuila	12,460 - El Abra	3530 - Tiwanaku
Pre-Columbian civilisation	Aztec	Muisca	Inca
Today	Mexico City	(Colombia) Bogotá, Tunja	(Peru) Lake Titicaca (Bolivia) Salar de Uyuni
Elevation	2,236 m (7,336 ft)	2,580 m (8,460 ft)	3,800 m (12,500 ft)
Area	9,738 km^{2} (3,760 sq mi)	25,000 km^{2} (9,700 sq mi)	175,773 km^{2} (67,866 sq mi)
References		(Note: Area Altiplano Cundiboyacense approximately 25,000 square kilometres (9,700 sq mi))	

== See also ==
- Aucanquilcha, Irruputuncu, Uturunku
