= Inca Huasi (ancient lake) =

Inca Huasi was a paleolake in the Andes. It was named by a research team in 2006.

It existed about 46,000 years ago in the Salar de Uyuni basin. Water levels during this episode rose by about 10 metres (33 ft). Overall, this lake cycle was short and not deep, with water levels reaching a height of 3,670 metres (12,040 ft). The lake would have had a surface of 21,000 square kilometres (8,100 sq mi). Most water was contributed to it by the Uyuni-Coipasa drainage basin, with only minimal contributions from Lake Titicaca. Changes in the South American monsoon may have triggered its formation.

Radiocarbon dates on tufa which formed in Lake Inca Huasi were dated at 45,760 ± 440 years ago. Uranium-thorium dating has yielded ages between 45,760 and 47,160 years. Overall the lake existed between 46,000 and 47,000 years ago. The Inca Huasi cycle coincides with the marine isotope stage 3, the formation of a deep lake in the Laguna Pozuelos basin and the expansion of glaciers in several parts of South America including the Puna.

This lake cycle took part during a glacial epoch, along with the Sajsi lake cycles. A more humid climate in northeastern Argentina and elsewhere in subtropical South America has been linked to the Inca Huasi phase. However, rainfall might not have increased by much in the Altiplano during the Inca Huasi cycle.

Other paleolakes are Coipasa, Ouki, Minchin, Sajsi, Salinas and Tauca. Research made in 2006 attributed the "Lake Minchin" to this lake phase.
