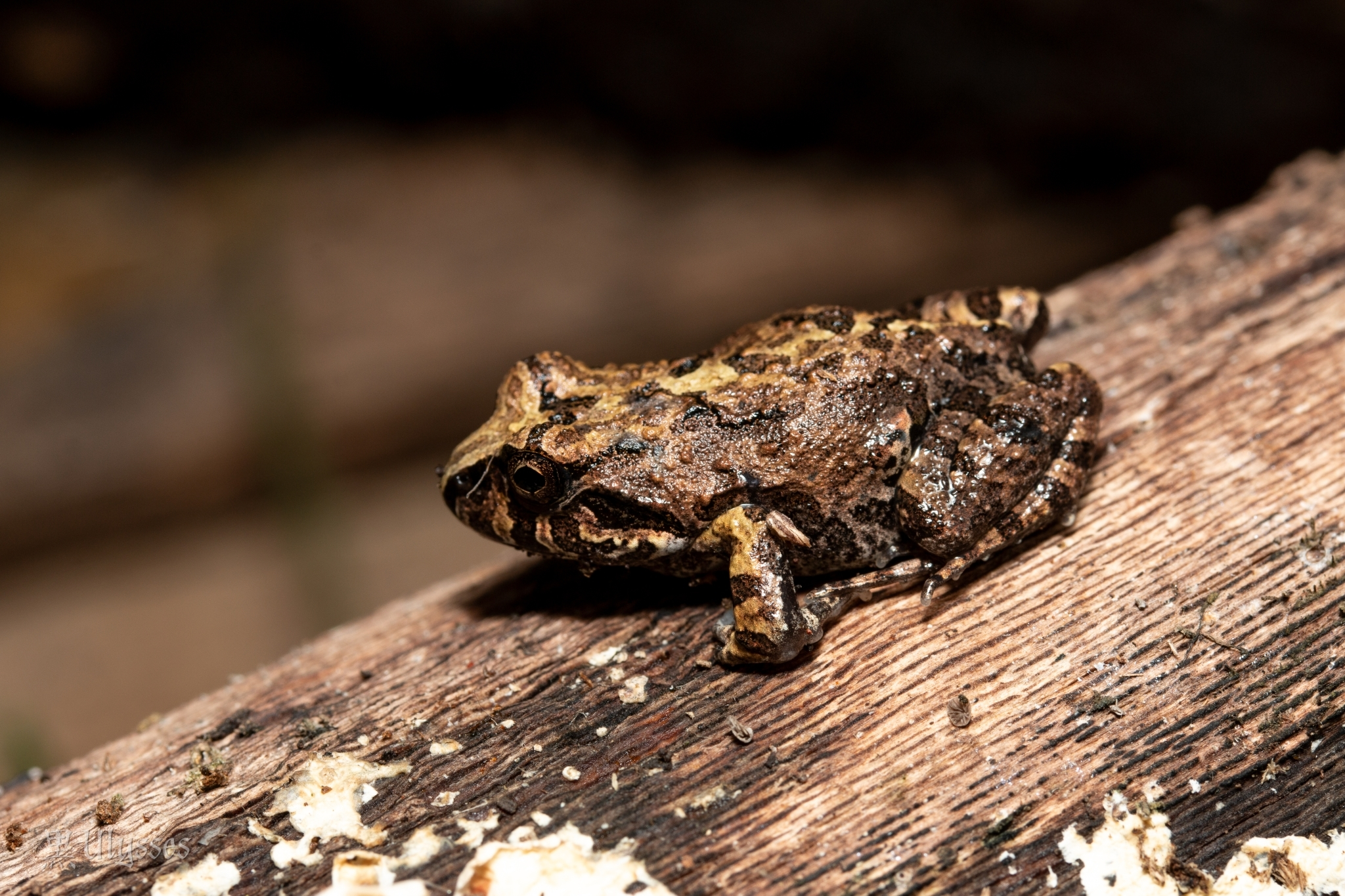

Conservation status
- Least Concern (IUCN 3.1)

Scientific classification
- Kingdom: Animalia
- Phylum: Chordata
- Class: Amphibia
- Order: Anura
- Family: Leptodactylidae
- Genus: Pleurodema
- Species: P. borellii

Binomial name
- Pleurodema borellii (Peracca, 1895)

Synonyms
- Paludicola borellii Peracca, 1895

= Pleurodema borellii =

Species of frog

Pleurodema borellii (common name: rufous four-eyed frog) is a species of frog in the family Leptodactylidae. It is found in northwestern Argentina and southern Bolivia. The taxonomic status of this species is uncertain, and it may be a junior synonym of Pleurodema cinerea.

== Habitat ==
It is abundant in Argentina, occurring in the Chaco-Yungas transition and montane grasslands on the eastern slopes of the Andes. It is also found in disturbed habitats, including urban areas. Scientists have seen it between 400 and 3,000 m (1,300 and 9,800 ft) above sea level. No major threats to this species have been identified.

== Reproduction ==
The male frog sits at the edge or in the water and calls to the female frogs. Pairs make a floating foam nest for their eggs.
