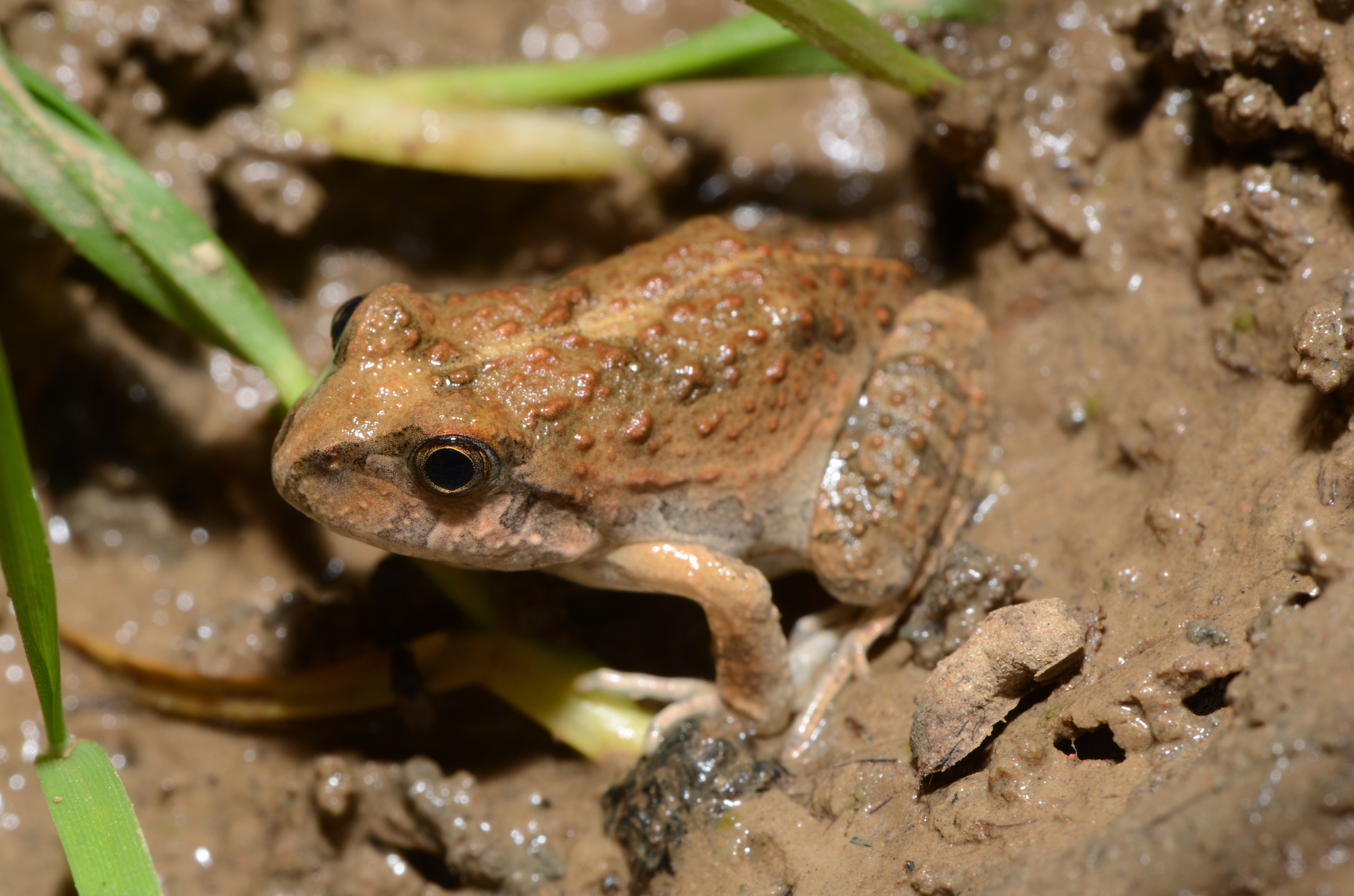

Conservation status
- Least Concern (IUCN 3.1)

Scientific classification
- Kingdom: Animalia
- Phylum: Chordata
- Class: Amphibia
- Order: Anura
- Family: Leptodactylidae
- Genus: Pleurodema
- Species: P. cinereum

Binomial name
- Pleurodema cinereum Cope, 1878

Synonyms
- Pleurodema cinerea Cope, 1878; Paludicola alpina Andersson, 1906

= Pleurodema cinereum =

Species of frog

Pleurodema cinereum is a species of frog in the family Leptodactylidae. It is found in the Andes in northwestern Argentina, Bolivia, and southeastern Peru. Its common name is Juliaca four-eyed frog, after its type locality, Juliaca. Pleurodema borellii is possibly a junior synonym of this species.

Its natural habitats are open montane puna grasslands and semi-deciduous forests. Scientists have observed the frog between 600 and 4,200 m (2,000 and 13,800 ft) above sea level.

Scientists have reported the frog in protected parks, many in Bolivia and two in Argentina: Los Andes Provincial Reserve and Laguna Pozuelos National Park.

Reproduction takes place in small permanent and temporary pools where pairs build floating foam nests. It is a common species facing no major threats.
