= Laguna de los Pozuelos Natural Monument =

Nature preservation reserve in Argentina

- Monumento Natural Laguna de los Pozuelos
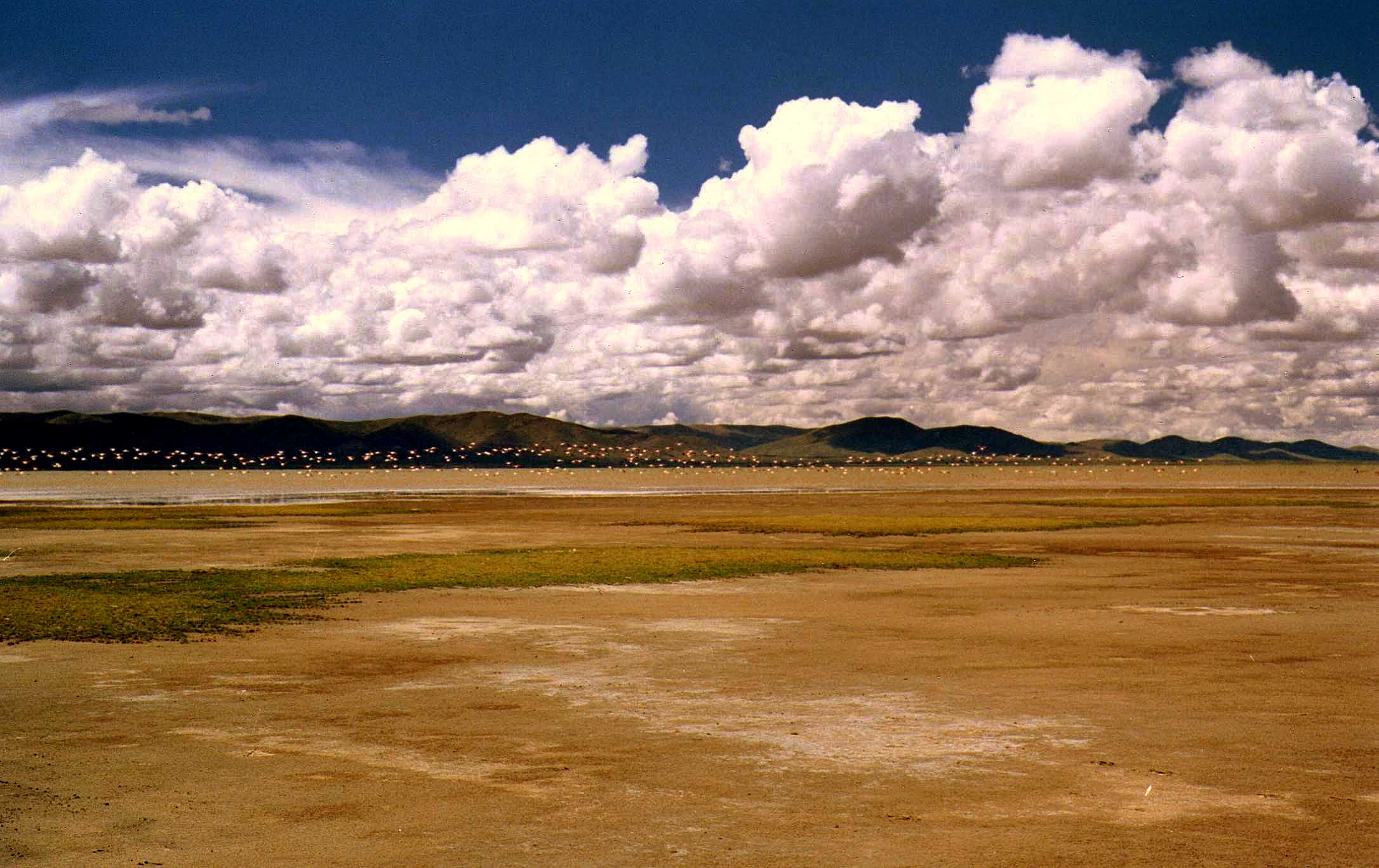

- Location within Argentina
- Nearest city: Puna, Jujuy province, Argentina
- Coordinates: 22°21′S 66°00′W
- Area: 16,000 ha (40,000 acres)
- Established: 1980
- Visitors: 1.826 (in 2019)
- Governing body: Argentine National Parks Administration (APN)

Ramsar Wetland
- Official name: Laguna de los Pozuelos
- Designated: 4 May 1992
- Reference no.: 555

Laguna de los Pozuelos Natural Monument is a nature preservation reserve located in the Jujuy province, in the Puna region, Argentina. It covers an area of 16,000 hectares (40,000 acres) and is at an altitude of 4,000 metres (13,000 ft) above sea level. It is part of the Puna Seca Central Andean Ecoregion. The reserve was created in 1980, under Provincial Law Nº 3,749/80, aiming to preserve the steppe environment and its lagoon, including the region's typical fauna.

== Protections ==
- 1980 - Creation of the reserve.
- 1990 - UNESCO Biosphere Reserve.
- 1992 - Ramsar site. Wetlands of International Importance.
- 2014 - WHSRN site. Western Hemisphere Seabird Reserve Network.

== Ecosystem ==
=== Fauna ===
573 species have been recorded in the reserve, 563 of which are native species. 21 of the species found in the area of the reserve are endangered.

The reserve is home to birds unique to the Puno region, such as the Andean avocet, the guayata, the Puna duck, the Andean gull, the Puna chorlito and the giant gallareta. During the summer, it is visited by migrating birds such as the Wilson's Phalarope (Phalaropus tricolor) and the Baird's Sandpiper (Calidris bairdii). The lagoon is home to Chilean flamingos (Phoenicopterus chilensis), Andean flamingos (Phoenicoparrus andinus) and the Puna flamingo (Phoenicoparrus jamesi). The Puna flamingo lives almost exclusively in the region and is in the endangered species category. The amphibians found in the region are the Pleurodema cinerea, Pleurodema marmorata and the Andean toad. Herbivores include the vicuña (Vicugna vicugna) and the llama. Also found are the puma, the red fox, the gray fox, the Andean cat and the royal opossum.

=== Flora ===
The vegetation of the reserve is sparse, characterized by tolilla (Fabiana densa) and chijua (Baccharis boliviensis) shrubs, and grassy pasture regions with Festuca orthopedica. The only species of tree in the area is the queñoa (Polylepsis tormentella spp). Surrounding the lagoon are rhizomatous grasses, Distichilis humilis, and Anthobryum triandrum.

=== Climate ===
The region of the reserve has an arid climate, with an average temperature of 8 °C (46 °F) in winter and 16 °C (61 °F) in summer and extreme temperatures of 43.5 °C (110.3 °F) and −30 °C (−22 °F). The total annual precipitation is up to 200 millimeters.

=== Lagoon ===
Pozuelos Lagoon has alkaline saline water, with a maximum depth of 1 meter and occupies an area of 7,000 hectares (17,000 acres), but its size increases and decreases seasonally. Complete drying of the lagoon has already occurred. The main tributaries of the lagoon are the Cincel and Santa Catalina rivers.

== Tourism ==
The reserve is open to the public, with free access. The activities that can be done in the reserve are hiking, bird watching, visiting the historic villages of Cochinoca, Casabindo and Rinconada, visiting Salinas Grandes, the Yavi community and the Coranzulí hot springs.
