= Salinas (ancient lake) =

Salinas is a lake event in the Salar de Uyuni, Bolivia.

The existence of this lake event is documented by tufa mounds which are up to 7 metres (23 ft) high. It belongs to a series of ancient lakes which covered the southern Altiplano in Bolivia, reaching a maximum surface area of 33,000–60,000 square kilometres (13,000–23,000 sq mi). This series includes several phases, two major phases named Lake Tauca and Ouki as well as a few minor ones. These lake phases appear to occur in response to increased moisture supply from the Amazon. The formation of the Salinas lake was probably accompanied by a 50-100% increase of precipitation.

The Salinas event lasted between approximately 95,000 and 80,000 years ago. It was preceded by another lake event, Ouki. Alternatively, it may be part of the Ouki event, more specifically of its waning stage. The Ouki and Salinas lake cycles coincided with cooling events in the North Atlantic, glacier expansions in the Puna and possibly the Cordillera Blanca, and with changes to alluvial fans at Llano de Chajnantor.

During the Salinas lake cycle, lake levels did not rise above 3,670 metres (12,040 ft) altitude, but overall lake levels were variable. Overall the lake covered a surface area of 21,000 square kilometres (8,100 sq mi) if the Poopo basin is included, or 20,500 square kilometres (7,900 sq mi) if not. The hydrology of the Salinas event includes water flow from the Lake Poopo into the Salar de Coipasa/Salar de Uyuni basin, as in the previous Ouki phase. This input probably did not exceed 45% of the total water supply of the Salinas lake.
