= Ouki =

Ancient lake in modern Bolivia

Ouki was an ancient lake in the Bolivian Altiplano. Its existence was postulated in 2006 by a group of scientists who had subdivided the Lake Minchin lake cycle into several lake phases. The Lake Minchin cycle had been previously identified in 1904 as a now disappeared lake in the central Altiplano. Sediments attributed to Lake Minchin may rather be part of Ouki. The dating is uncertain, with radiocarbon and uranium-thorium dating yielding different dates spanning the time between 28,200 and 125,990 ± 9,580 years ago.

Whether Ouki existed is a subject of controversy. In 2011, scientists claimed that the lake did not exist outside of the Lake Poopo basin. The formation of Ouki is associated with a major glaciation and was probably caused by increased precipitation, which has also been observed elsewhere.

== General characteristics ==
Ouki may have reached a water level of approximately 3,735 metres (12,254 ft) with preserved shorelines at Lake Poopó, and it may have covered the Salar de Uyuni, the Salar de Coipasa and the Lake Poopó area, although the Uyuni and Coipasa basins may rather have been filled by a separate postulated lake, Lake Salinas. Estimates of the surface area depend on the assumed lake levels and whether the lake covered only the Lake Poopó basin or also the Uyuni/Coipasa basins. Estimates range from 10,400–46,500 square kilometres (4,000–18,000 sq mi).

The Ouki lake is one of the so-called deep lake cycles, along with Lake Tauca, from which it may have separated during a period when water levels dropped below 3,700 metres (12,100 ft) altitude. At a locality called Vinto, it has left characteristic tufa deposits which have shapes of inverted cones. The depth of the lake did not exceed c. 80 metres (260 ft). The subsequent Salinas lake cycle may simply be a shrinking stage of the Ouki lake. Likewise, the existence of Lake Minchin may be in part based on misattributing deposits left by Ouki. The Ouki lake cycle may be subdivided into individual phases in the future.

The Ouki lake may have been populated by species such as Pisidium bivalves, ostracodes and the Biomphalaria andecola snail. Waters had a high concentration of strontium. While one model inferred from strontium isotope data assumes that most of the Ouki water was contributed by the Poopó basin, another called "Ouki B" assumes a 69% contribution by waters from Lake Titicaca and no contribution from the Coipasa and Uyuni basins, which is less likely. Waters from the Poopó basin would have spilled into the Uyuni/Coipasa basin. The drying of the lake left deposits containing amphibole, illite, plagioclase feldspar, potassium feldspar, kaolinite, pyroxene, quartz and smectite.

=== Dating ===
Various radiometric dates have been obtained for the postulated Ouki paleolake from tufa, wood and fossils of Bulimulidae and Littoridina, mostly within the basin of Lake Poopo. There is noticeable disagreement between radiometric dates obtained by uranium-thorium dating and dates obtained by radiocarbon dating, probably because Ouki is so old that radiocarbon dating becomes unreliable. The former yield ages ranging between 120,000 and 98,000 years ago. The latter produce ages between 45,200 and 28,200 years ago. Radiocarbon dates of such old samples can easily suffer from contamination by modern carbon, creating spuriously young ages. The uranium-thorium dates range between 96,740 ±5,560 and 125,990 ± 9,580 years ago. The exact lake level history is poorly known, but between 115,000 and 100,000 years ago, the water was higher than 3,720 metres (12,200 ft) elevation. The Ouki stage took place during marine isotope stage 5. Episodes of increased lake size lake level changes coincide with cold periods in the North Atlantic. Alternatively, if radiocarbon dates of 44,609 ± 927 to 33,422 ± 1937 are attributed to Ouki, sediments in the Uyuni basin attributed to Lake Minchin would instead belong to Ouki.

== Context ==
Lake Ouki's formation may have been caused by an increase in precipitation, and may be further associated with changes in the position of the ITCZ and La Nina-like conditions. The increase of precipitation may have amounted to 50–100%.

The Ouki lake cycle occurred during a major glaciation that may also be recorded from moraine deposits in the southern Puna, as well as at a time of low summer insolation in the southern hemisphere but with a southward expansion of the South American monsoon. Lake levels in Lake Huinaymarca, the southern basin of Lake Tauca, were low during the proposed Ouki period. Sediments in the Majes River valley indicate humid conditions during the proposed Ouki period, as do lake level records in the Atacama. The humid period in Peru during the Ouki phase may be associated with several large landslides such as the c. 40 cubic kilometres (9.6 cu mi) Chuquibamba landslide complex and the Caqilluco landslides, although other researchers did not find an increase in landslide activity there. Accumulation of sediments in the Pativilca valley and fluvial activity at Lima and in the Lomas de Lachay in Peru also coincide with the Ouki humid period.

== Controversy ==
The existence of this lake was questioned in 2011, based on the lack of evidence for such a lake in drill cores of Salar de Uyuni. It is unknown whether the Poopó basin lake extended to the Uyuni/Coipasa basins as well. The sill separating the Poopó and Uyuni/Coipasa basins may not have been breached until 80,000–60,000 years ago. In 2013, it was suggested that the "L4" lacustrine stage, which has been identified in drill cores taken from Salar de Uyuni, may be the Ouki/Salinas lake phase.
