= Lake Poopó =

Saline lake in Bolivia

- Lago Poopó (Spanish)
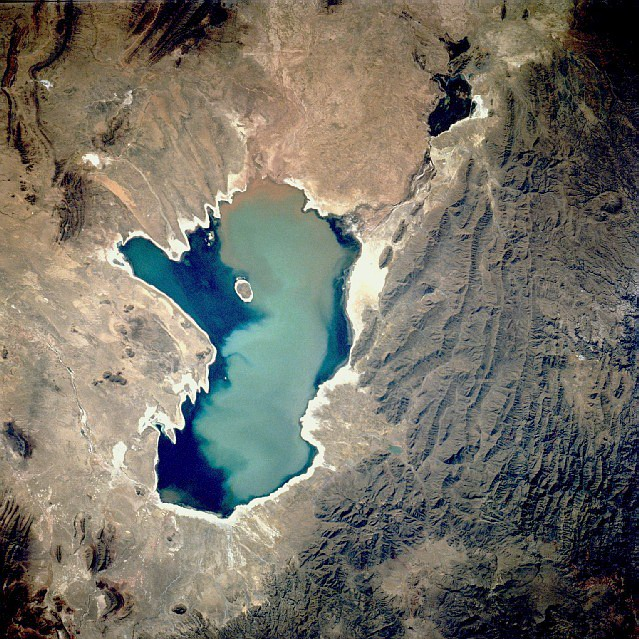
- Aerial photograph of the lake in 1991

- Location within Bolivia Location within South America
- Interactive map of Lake Poopó
- Location: Altiplano
- Coordinates: 18°33′S 67°05′W
- Type: Endorheic salt lake
- Primary inflows: River Desaguadero
- Primary outflows: evaporation
- Catchment area: 27,700 km^{2} (10,700 sq mi)
- Basin countries: Bolivia
- Surface area: 1,000 km^{2} (390 sq mi)
- Average depth: >1 m (3 ft 3 in)
- Surface elevation: 3,686 m (12,093 ft)
- Settlements: Oruro; Challapata

Ramsar Wetland
- Official name: Lagos Poopó y Uru Uru
- Designated: 11 July 2002
- Reference no.: 1181

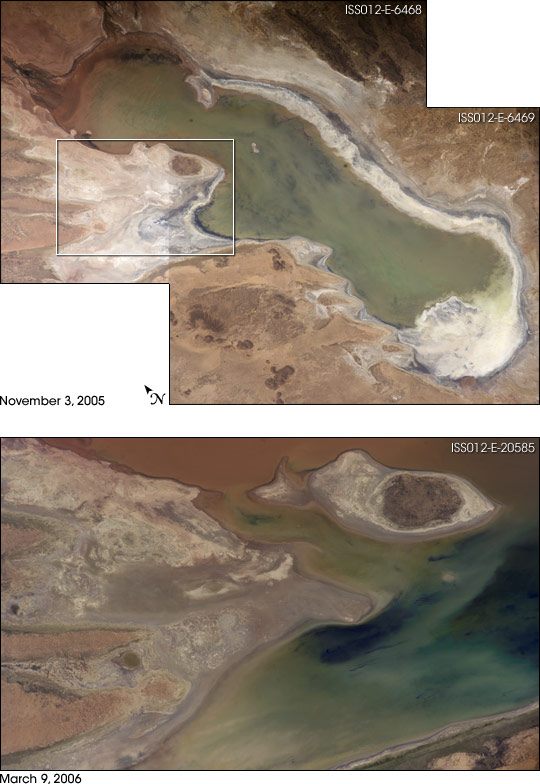
The top photo shows the lake with low water levels, exposing large tracts of salt and mud flats. Rainfall afterwards resulted in flooding of Poopó with muddy waters from the Desaguadero River. The lower photo shows the extent of flooding of the western salt flats, sufficient to create an ephemeral island – as shown by the rectangle.

Lake Poopó (Spanish: Lago Poopó Spanish: [ˈlaɣo po.oˈpo]) was a large saline lake in a shallow depression in the Altiplano in Oruro Department, Bolivia, at an altitude of approximately 3,700 m (12,100 ft). Due to the lake's length and width (90 by 32 km; 56 by 20 mi), it made up the eastern half of Oruro, known as a mining region in southwest Bolivia. The permanent part of the lake body covered approximately 1,000 square kilometres (390 sq mi) and it was the second-largest lake in the country. The lake received most of its water from the Desaguadero River, which flows from Lake Titicaca at the north end of the Altiplano. Since the lake lacked any major outlet and had a mean depth of less than 3 m (10 ft), the surface area differed greatly seasonally.

In 2002, the lake was designated as a site for conservation under the Ramsar Convention. By December 2015, the lake had completely dried up, leaving only a few marshy areas. Despite the lake rebounding from two previous recorded drying instances, as of 2016, the lake's recovery is considered unlikely. Suggested causes of the decline are the melting of the Andes glaciers and loss of their waters, because of a drought due to climate change, as well as continued diversion of water for mining and agriculture.

== Archaeological evidence ==
Archaeological investigations conducted by the San Andrés University of La Paz, Bolivia, shows the influence of the Wankarani culture in the Poopó area. Complex central urban areas, such as villages and towns, were developed that expanded into the Poopó basin during the Late Formative period, (200 BC – 200 AD), probably in conjunction with changing patterns of agriculture. Herders and the life style of llama caravan merchants coexisted with more sedentary farmers in a harmonious system of exchange of goods and services.

Other investigators examining the following period, the Early Regional Developments (c. 300 – 900 AD), have concluded that the size of the inhabited areas increased. The South Poopó inhabitants developed a unique style of ceramics style with triangular spirals. The east portion of the lake has evidence of an important Tiwanaku enclave, with ceramic styles from the core Titicaca area and surrounding styles, demonstrating the interactions between different peoples in the area.

== Lake dynamics ==
The main inlet of Lake Poopó (roughly 92% of the water) came from the Desaguadero River, which entered the lake at the north end. It flowed south from Lake Titicaca. There were numerous smaller inlets along the eastern shore of the lake, many of which were dry most of the year. At times of very high water levels, Poopó was connected to the salt desert Salar de Coipasa in the west. A minor outlet led to Salar de Uyuni in the far south of the Altiplano, but as the lake lacks any major outlet, it is classified as an endorheic basin.

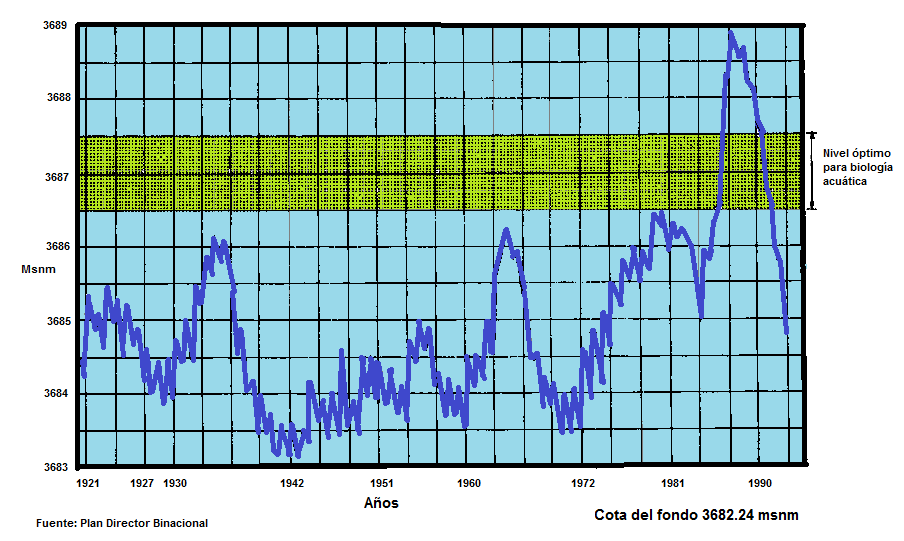
Historic Levels of Lake Poopó

When the water level of Lake Titicaca was below 3,810 m (12,500 ft), the flow of Desaguadero River was so low it could no longer compensate for the massive water losses due to evaporation from the surface of Lake Poopó. At this point, the lake volume began to decrease. At its maximum in 1986, the lake had an area of 3,500 km^{2} (1,400 sq mi). During the years that followed, the surface area steadily decreased until 1994, when the lake disappeared completely. The time period between 1975 and 1992 was the longest period in recent times when the lake had a continuous water body.

Action has been taken in order to make the area ecologically sustainable again, with the help of funding from the European Union. But the efforts have been unable to offset other changes: since 1995 regional temperatures have risen and consequently tripled evaporation rates. In addition, water was drawn off for mining and irrigation, compounding the problems. On 20 January 2016 the area was declared a disaster zone by the Bolivian government.

=== Salinity and geology ===
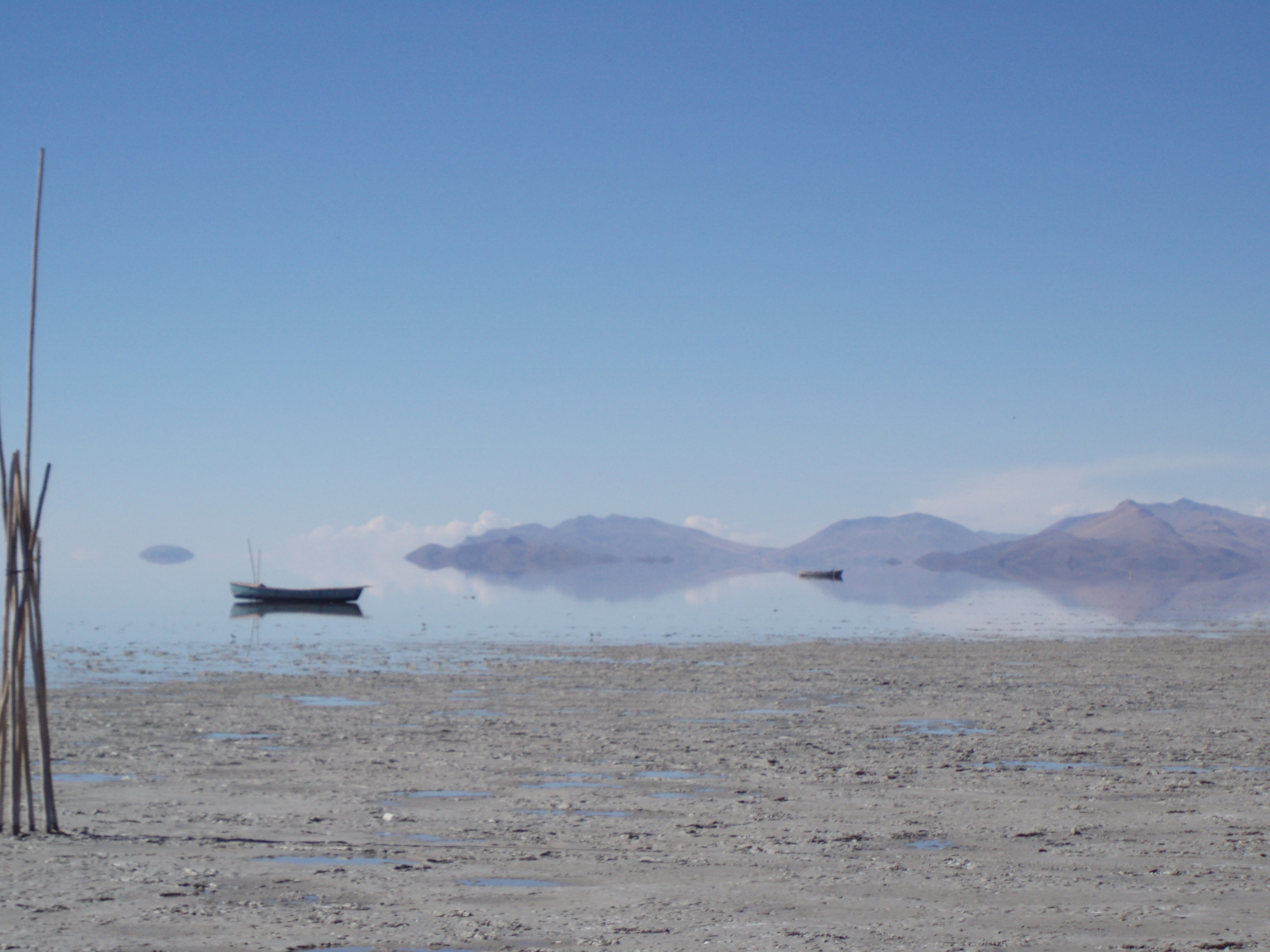
Fishing in Lake Poopó was small scale and carried out using rowing boats and small nets. The image shows boats owned by fishermen from Llapallapani.

The water of Lake Poopó was highly saline. The salinity was a result of the endorheic nature of the hydrological system on the Altiplano, which allowed all weathered ions to remain in the system. The salinity of Lake Poopó was further increased by the arid climate and the high evaporation from the lake surface.

In the northern end of Lake Poopó, dilution of the salinity occurred due to freshwater flow from the Desaguadero River. The salt gradient of the water increased towards the south.

The salinity varied with water volume. During October and November 2006, the salinity in the north end of the lake varied between brackish and saline (15–30,000 mg/L). In the south end of the lake the water was classified as a brine (105,000–125,000 mg/L). The water type was a 4–2 Na-(Mg)-Cl-(SO_{4}).

Geological sources of sodium chloride (NaCl), such as halite and feldspars, are present in the drainage area. These could also contribute to the salinity of Lake Poopó. The lake body was situated on top of Cenozoic deposits, consisting mainly of unconsolidated material. These sediments are the remains of extensive prehistoric lakes, which covered the Altiplano during at least five glaciation periods.

=== Mining and heavy metals ===
There is a long tradition of mining in the Poopó Basin. Extraction of metals was ordered in the 13th century to support the Inca army. After Spanish colonization in the 16th century, the mining operations increased in scale. At this point the region became known as one of the mining centres of Bolivia.

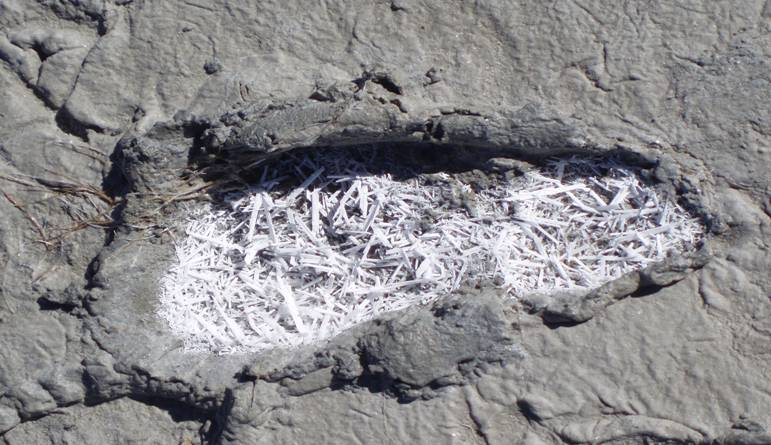
Salt crystals in footprints on the shore of Lake Poopó

The mining districts are situated at the foothills of the Cordillera Oriental along the eastern border of the Poopó basin. The most important minerals to the economy are silver and tin.

Studies have shown elevated concentrations of heavy metals in surface and ground waters of the Poopó basin. These metals are naturally present in the bedrock, from which they are released through weathering processes. The mining activities in the area further contributes to the heavy metal pollution. Acid leaching from mines and mechanical processing of ore speed up the process.

The major part of the heavy metals transported to Lake Poopó were immobilized in the bottom sediments. But concentrations of arsenic, lead, and cadmium in the lake water exceeded Bolivian and World Health Organization guideline values for drinking water.

== Flora and fauna ==
There were only three fish species in the system: the native pupfish Orestias agassizii and catfish Trichomycterus rivulatus, and the introduced silverside Odontesthes bonariensis. The lake had a relatively large fish population, but by 2017 pollution and the near-complete reduction of water had all but decimated the locally important fishing industry.

The aquatic bird life was very diverse, with a total of 34 species. Most famous are the three species of flamingo (Andean, James's and Chilean), which mainly lived in the shallow lagoons in the northern and eastern parts of the lake. An inventory of the bird population, made in 2000 in cooperation with BirdLife International, identified 6 threatened species and others that are near-threatened. Among these are the Andean flamingo and the Andean condor.

A total of 17 higher plants and 3 species of algae were identified in and around Lake Poopó. Due to the constant drought and flooding, the littoral zone experienced great disturbances. As a result, there was hardly any vegetation to be found on the shores of the lake.

== Effects of the loss of the lake ==
The sparse communities nearby have suffered culturally and financially due to the loss of the lake, as the local economy was dependent on lake fishing. Additionally, many bird species native to Bolivia and internationally have been affected due to loss of food, and an annual migration area.

== See also ==
- Desertification
- Ouki
- Rainy season in the Altiplano
- Tulare Lake
- Aral Sea
