= Pachat'aqa =

Archaeological site in Bolivia

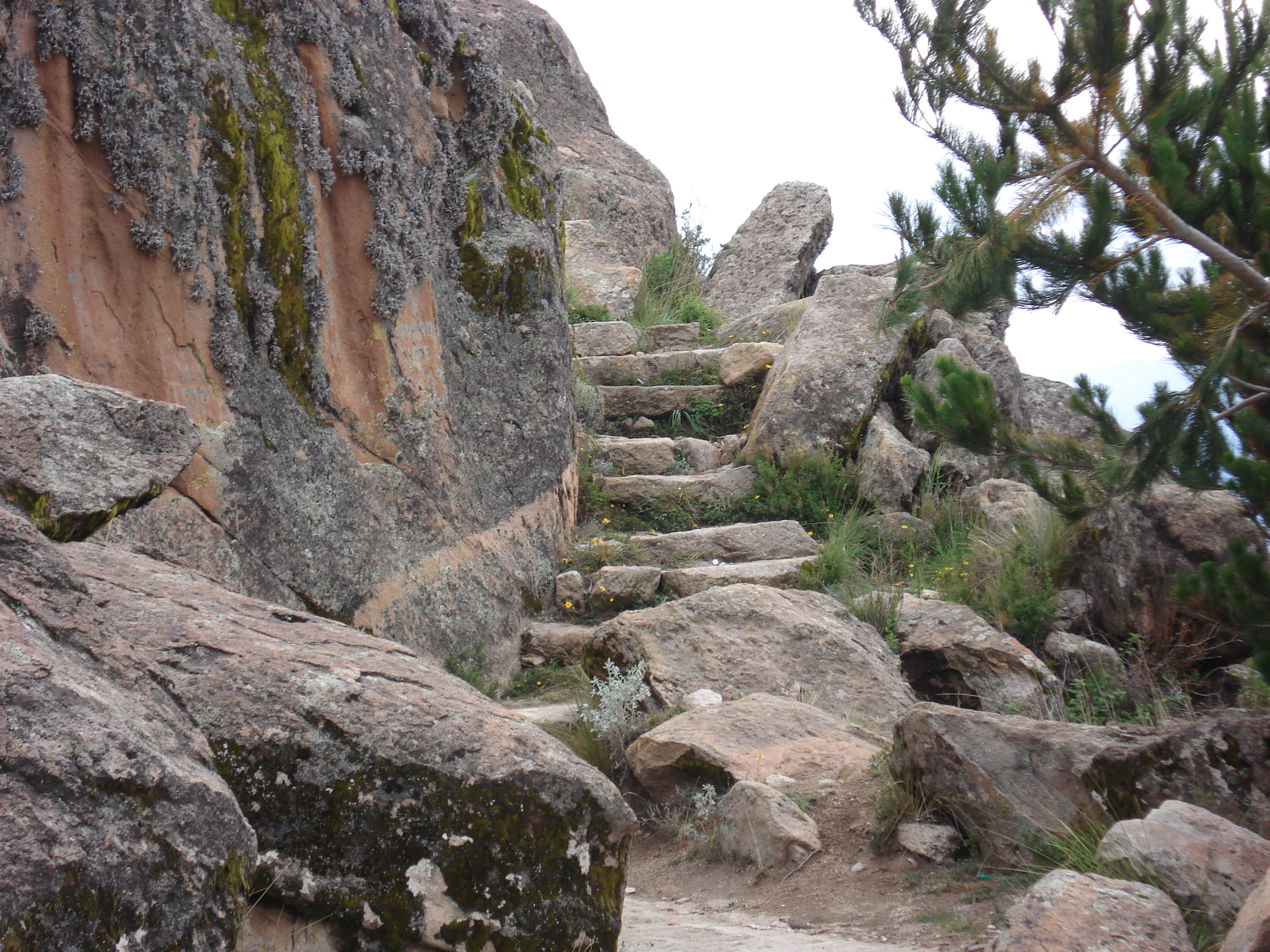
- Steps at the entrance to Pachat'aqa

- Location within Bolivia
- 16°10′18.3″S 69°5′6.7″W
- Location: Bolivia, La Paz Department, Manco Kapac Province
- Region: Andes

Pachataka (also spelled Pachataca or Pachat'aqa), commonly known as the Inca Gallows, is an archaeological site in Bolivia, located near Lake Titicaca in the municipality of Copacabana, Manco Kapac Province, within the La Paz Department.

Pachataka is a pre-Inca astronomical observatory formed by a lintel made of two parallel stone blocks. It was used to determine the seasons, track lunar movements, and predict eclipses. It is located at the summit of Mount Kesanani, approximately 600 meters south of the town of Copacabana.

In the Aymara language, "Pachataka" means "the place where time is measured." The Spanish mistakenly named it the "Inca Gallows."

According to mathematical and astronomical calculations conducted by the Institute of Cosmic Physics of Bolivia, the observatory dates approximately to 1764 B.C., during the era of the Chiripa culture.

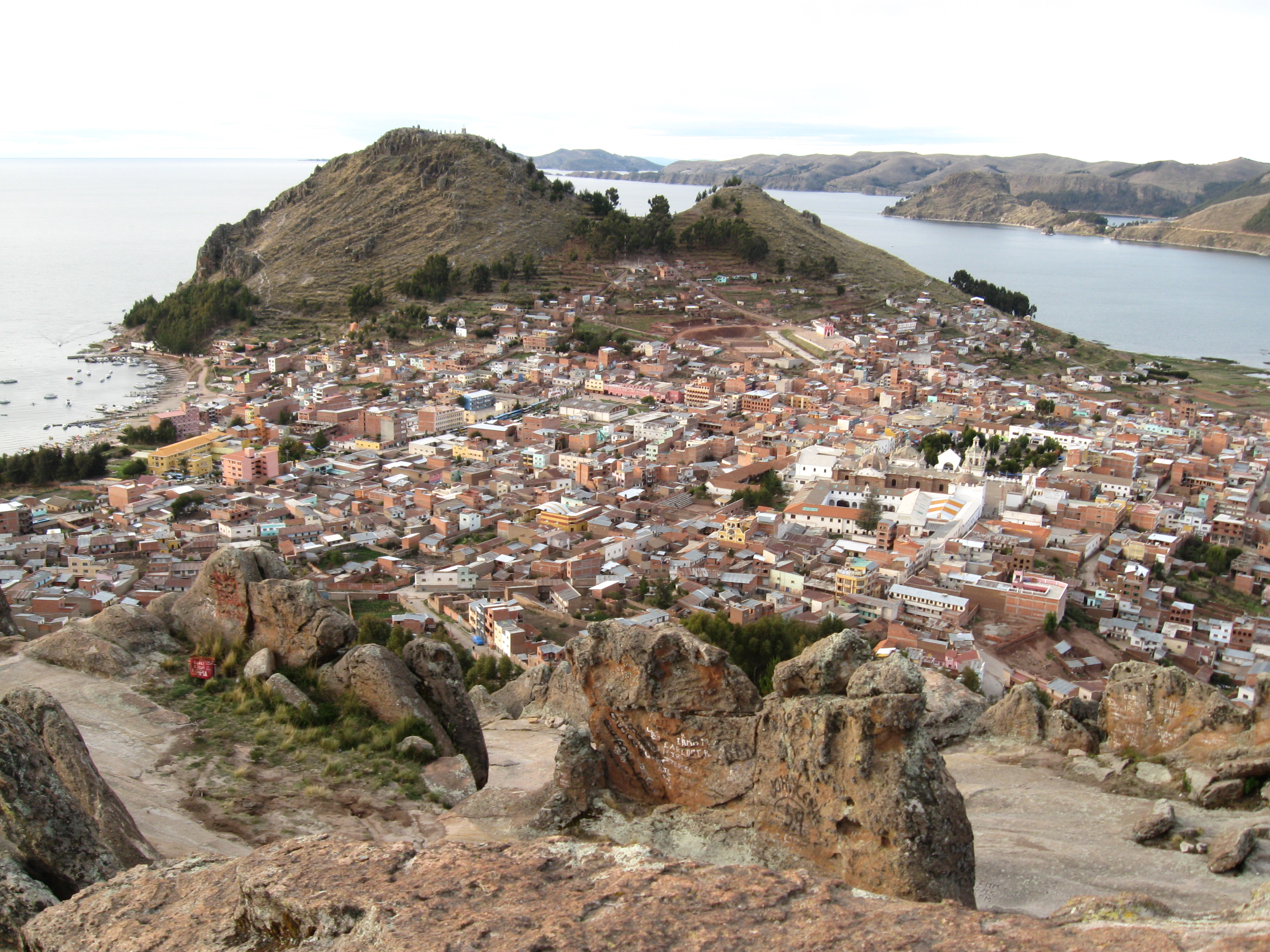
Copacabana and Lake Titicaca as seen from Pachat'aqa

== See also ==
- Chinkana
- Iñaq Uyu
- Pilkokaina
- Copacabana
- Isla del Sol
