= Copacabana, Bolivia =

Copacabana Kotakawana
- City
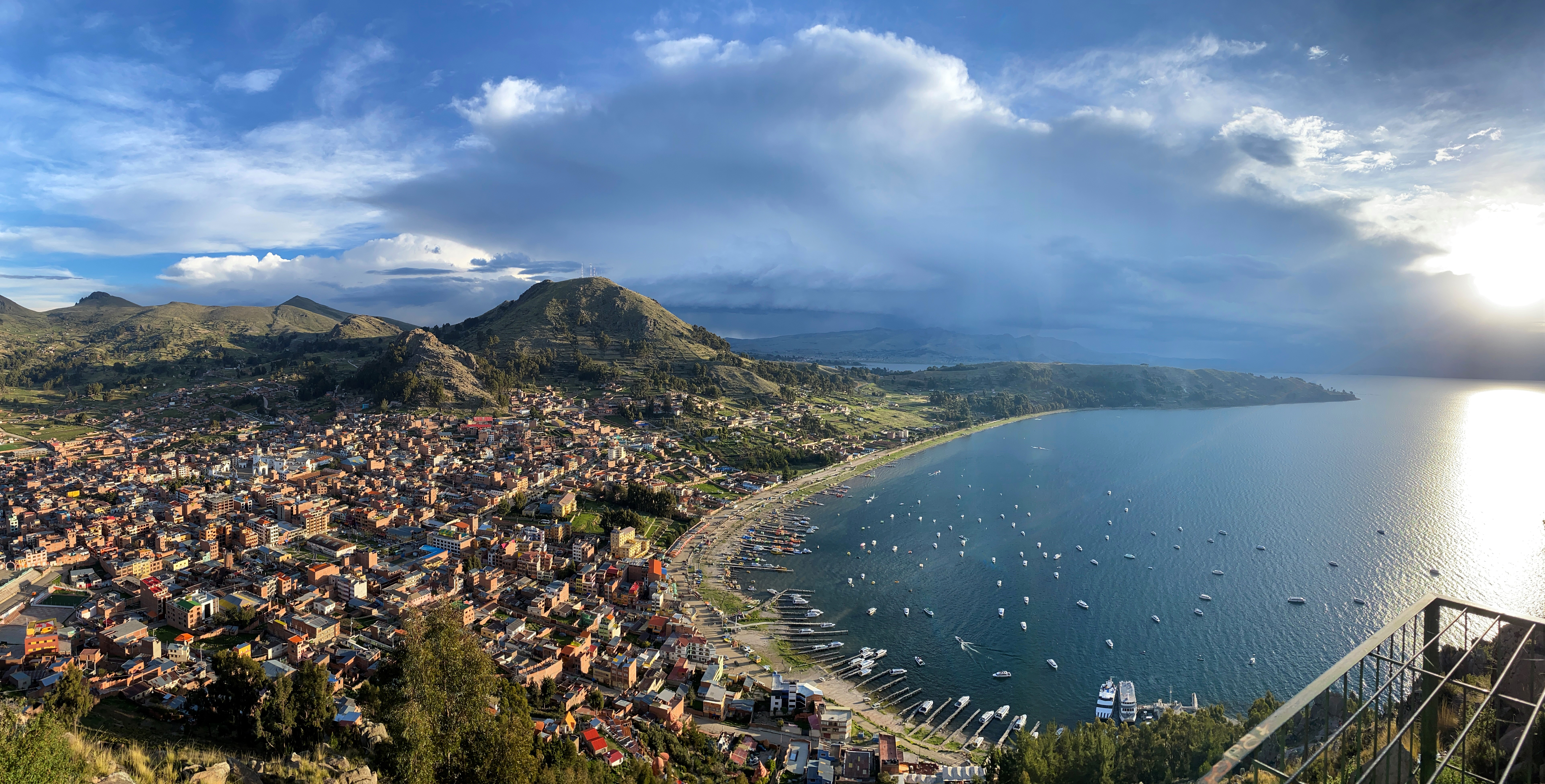
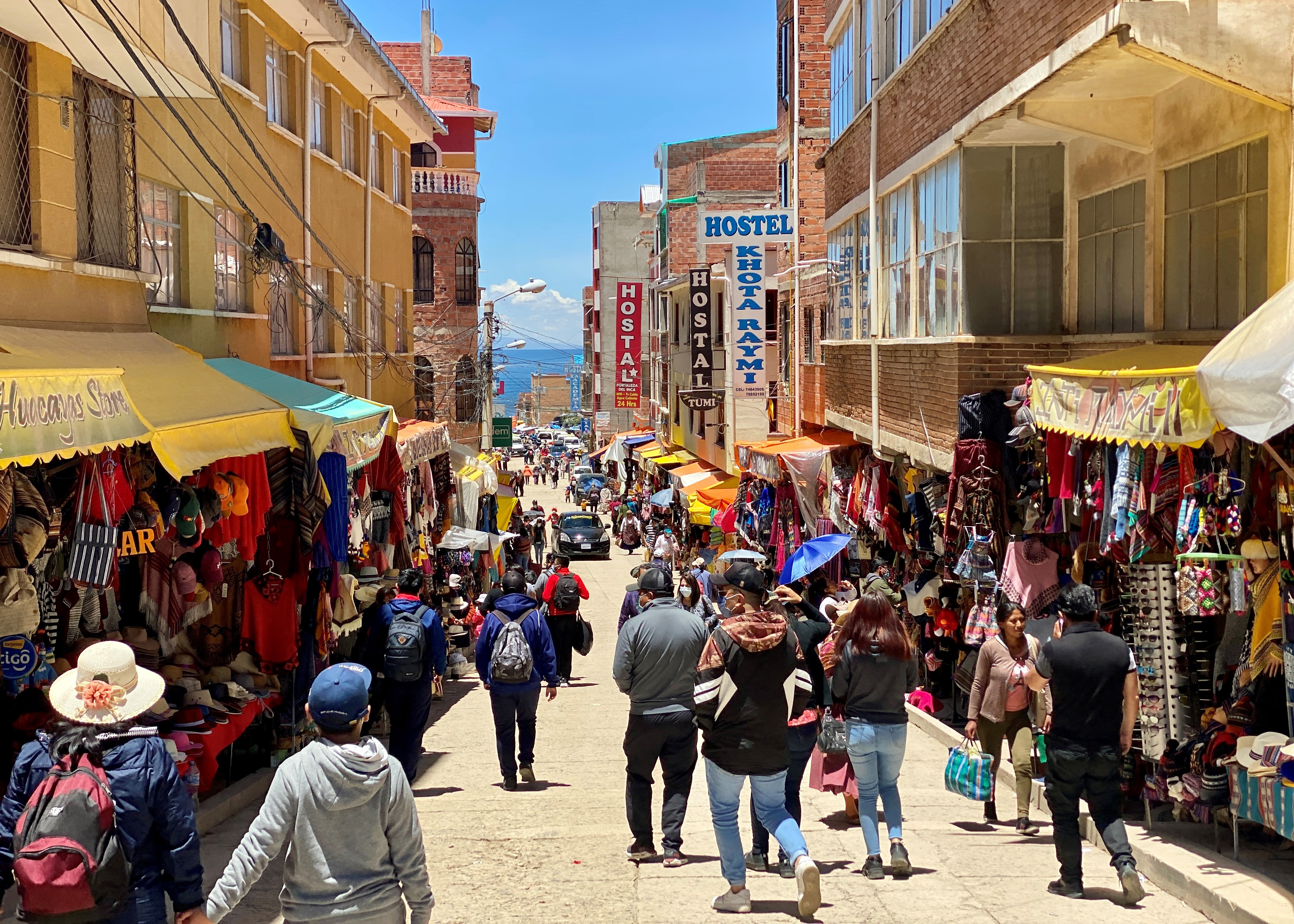
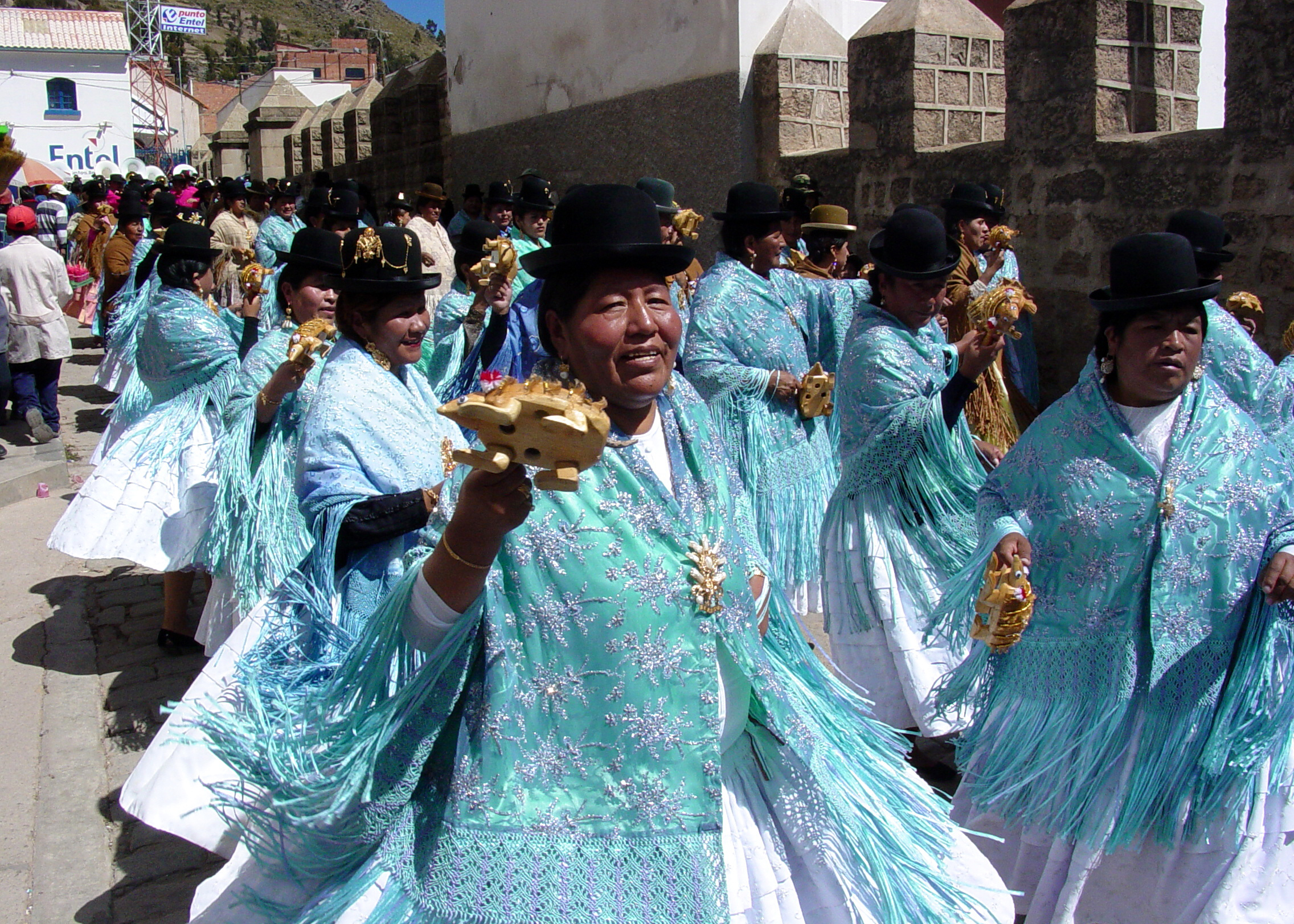
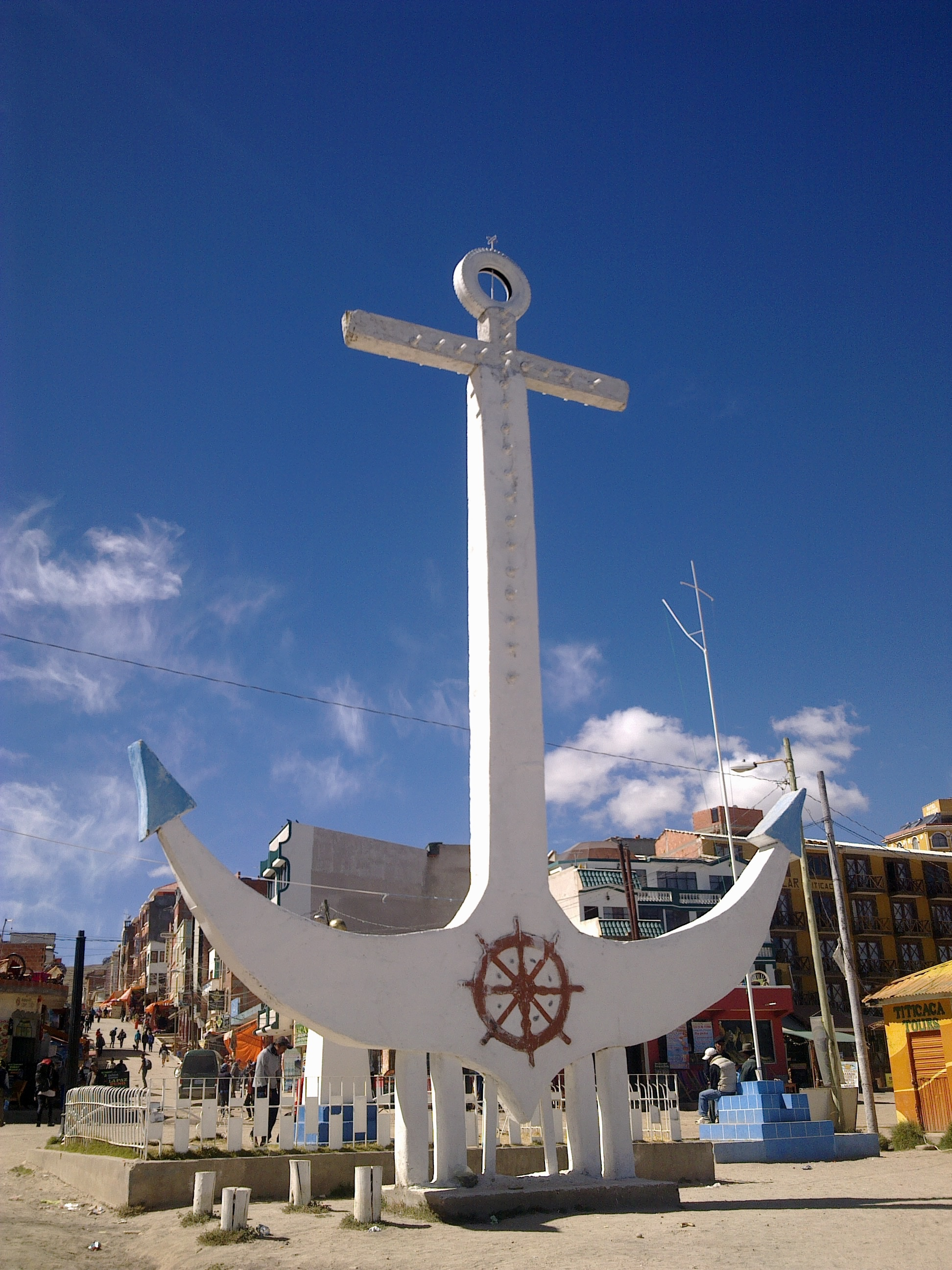
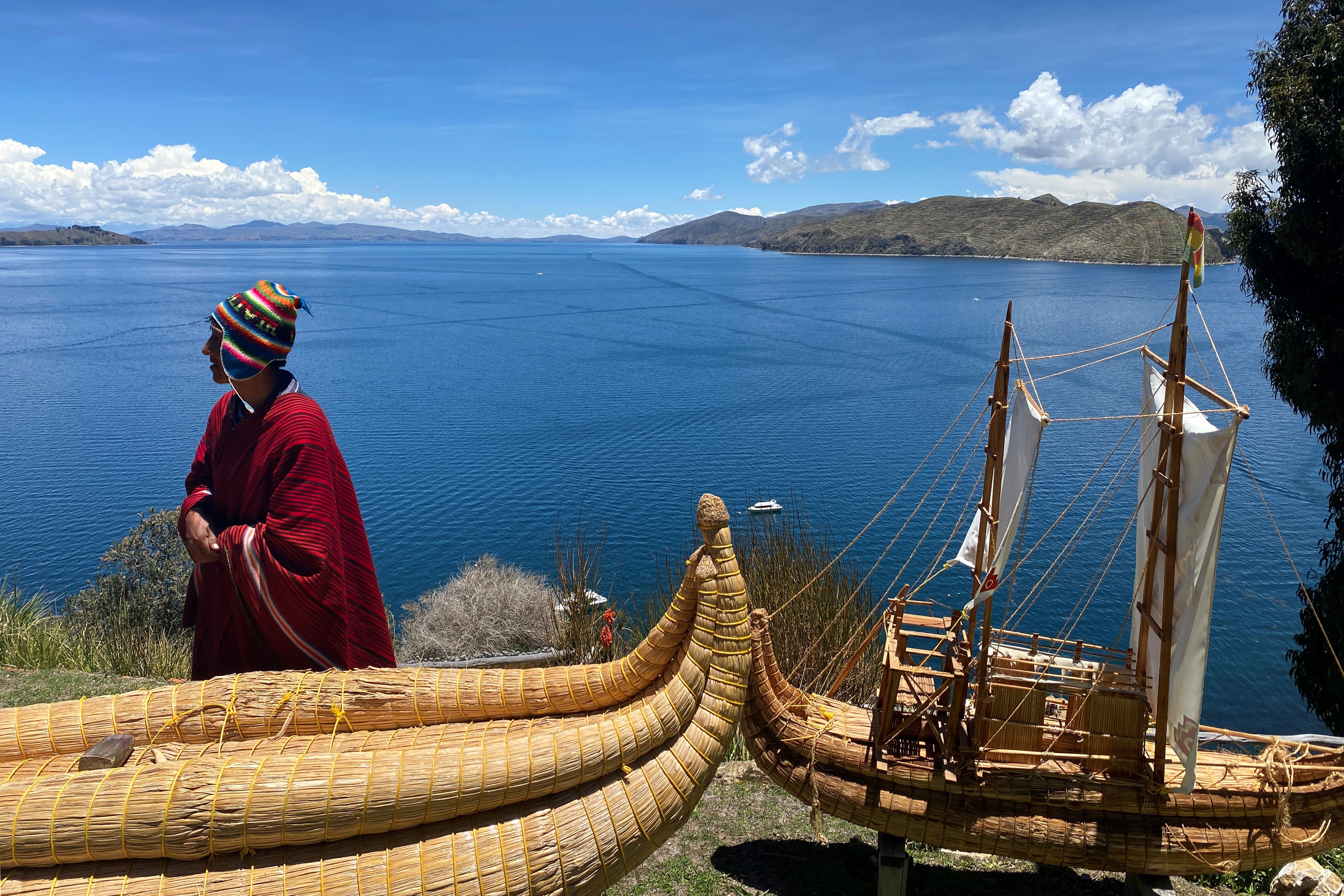
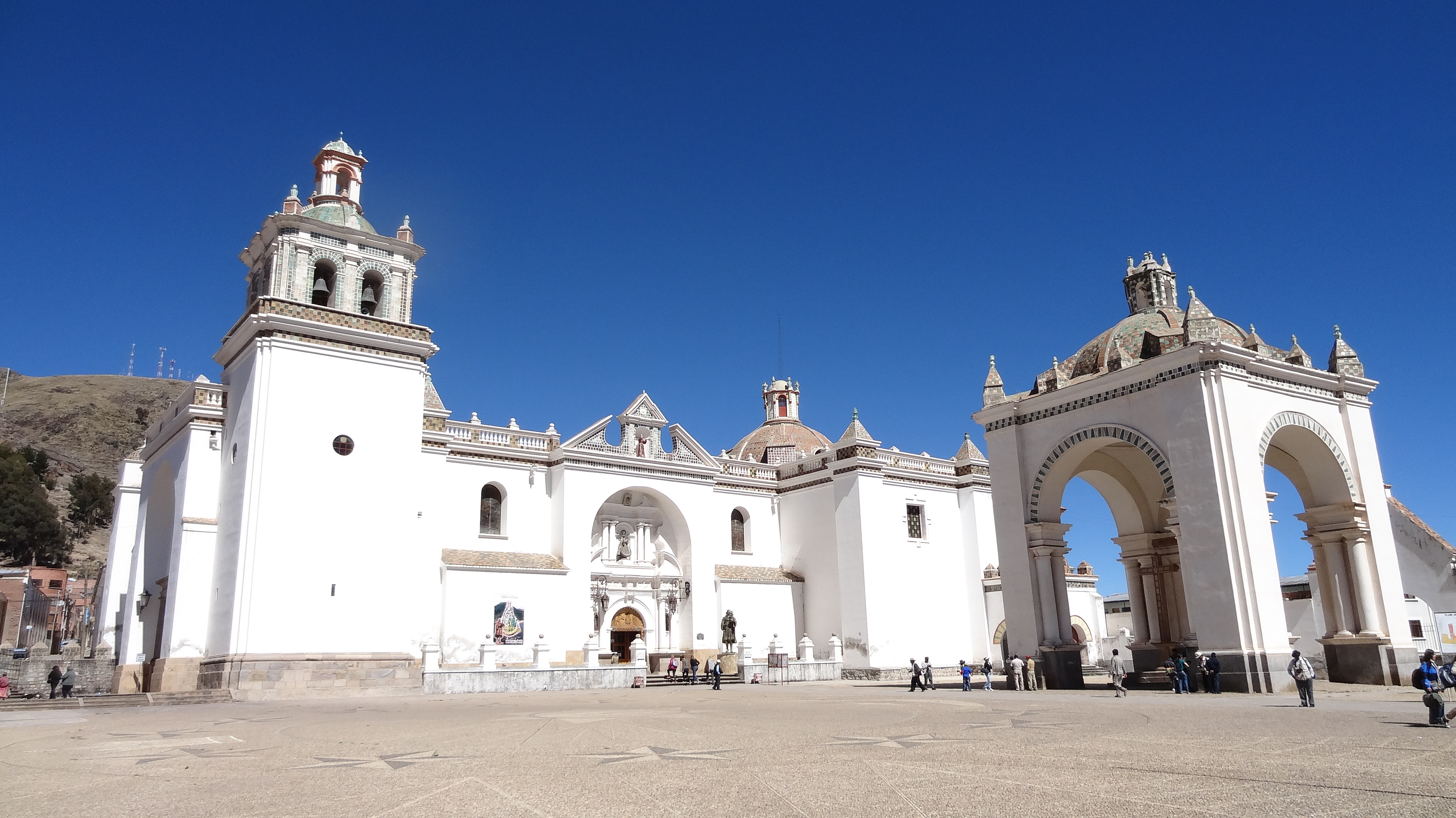
- Panorama of Copacabana and Lake Titicaca, 6 de agosto Avenue, parade in Copacabana, Eduardo Abaroa Naval Monument, an Aymara man and a totora boat, Basilica of Our Lady of Copacabana

- Location within Bolivia
- Coordinates: 16°10′S 69°05′W
- Country: Bolivia
- Department: La Paz Department (Bolivia)
- Province: Manco Kapac Province
- Municipality: Copacabana Municipality

Government
  - Mayor: Juan Gabriel Ticona Perez

Area
  - Total: 346.5 km^{2} (133.8 sq mi)
  - Land: 340.1 km^{2} (131.3 sq mi)
  - Water: 6.4 km^{2} (2.5 sq mi)
- Elevation: 3,841 m (12,602 ft)

Population (2006)
  - Total: 6,000
  - Density: 358.5/km^{2} (929/sq mi)
- Time zone: UTC−4 (BOT)
- Area code: Area code 591
- FIPS code: 45-16000
- GNIS feature ID: 1245051

Copacabana is the main Bolivian town on the shore of Lake Titicaca. The town has a large 17th-century shrine, the Basilica of Our Lady of Copacabana, dedicated to Our Lady of Copacabana, the patron saint of Bolivia. The town is a tourism destination in Bolivia. It is also known for its trout and quaint atmosphere. Built between Mount Calvario and Mount Niño Calvario, the town has approximately 6,000 inhabitants. Copacabana's religious celebrations, cultural heritage and traditional festivals are well known throughout Bolivia. Boats leave for Isla del Sol, the sacred Inca island, from Copacabana. Copacabana is served by Copacabana Airport.

== History ==
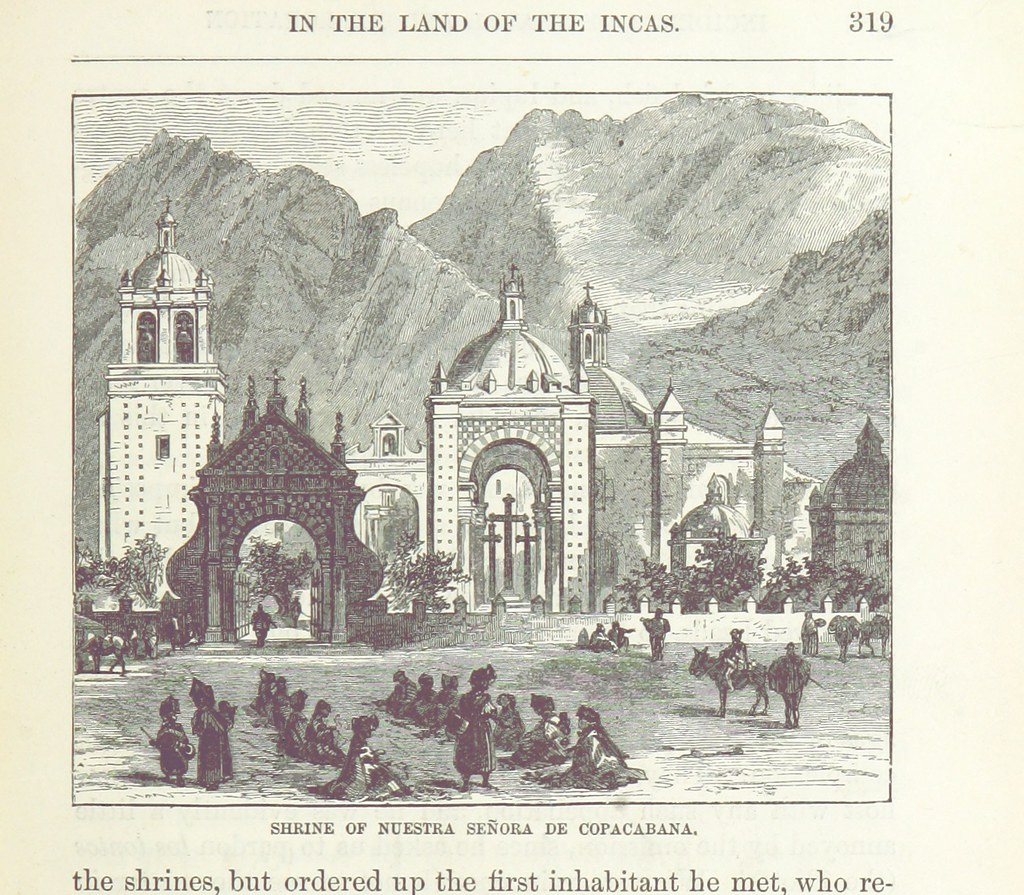
An illustration of the Basilica of Our Lady of Copacabana in 1877

During the wars of independence, the Basilica of Our Lady of Copacabana was despoiled of most of its rich ornaments and gifts, and plundering in the course of political disturbances has further contributed to impoverishment. It is a shrine for pilgrims from Bolivia and southern Peru, and on 6 August, the feast of its patron saint, it is attended by thousands.

Before 1534, Copacabana was an outpost of Inca occupation among dozens of other sites in Bolivia. The Incas held it as the key to the very ancient shrine and oracle on the Island of Titicaca, which they had adopted as a place of worship, adopting the veneration with which it was held by the Aymaras from time immemorial. At Copacabana, there were minor shrines in which the ceremonies of the Incas were observed along with those of the original inhabitants. When the Spaniards first visited the Islands of Titicaca and Loati, in 1534 and 1538, the Andean Cosmovision were abandoned and the Dominicans made Copacabana the centre of their missions. Non-monastic priests then replaced them at the instigation of the Viceroy Francisco de Toledo, and finally the mission and its annexes were entrusted to the Augustinians in 1589.

In 1582, the grandson of Inca ruler Manco Kapac, struck by the sight of the statues of the Blessed Virgin which he saw in some of the churches at La Paz, tried to make one himself, and after many failures, succeeded in producing one of excellent quality, and it was placed at Copacabana as the statue of the tutelar protectress of the community. Many miracles have been attributed to it, and its fame has spread far beyond the limits of its surroundings to all five continents. It is kept in a special chapel, where local Aymaras, Bolivians and those from all over the world are untiring in their devotions.

During the Great Indigenous Uprising of 1781, while the church itself was desecrated, the "Camarin", as the chapel is called, remained untouched and exempt from spoilage. Copacabana is the scene of often boisterous indigenous celebrations. On 2 February and 6 August, Church festivals are celebrated with indigenous dances that the clergy have not been able to suppress entirely. Copacabana is surrounded by pre-Columbian ruins of considerable interest.

== Climate ==
Copacabana features a cold subtropical highland climate (Köppen: Cwc, Trewartha: Cwlk) - a rare type of climate, but commonplace near most of Lake Titicaca. Similar to many areas with this climate, Copacabana features a markedly drier "low-sun" season. Because of the high altitude of Copacabana, the town is chilly throughout the course of the year. However, because Copacabana is located at a tropical latitude, there are only slight variations in temperatures. While daytime temperatures hover around 15 °C (59 °F) throughout the year, nighttime temperatures during the "low-sun" season are somewhat cooler than at other times of the year. It is not uncommon for temperatures to drop below freezing during the "low-sun" season.

Climate data for Copacabana, Bolivia, elevation: 3,815 metres (12,516 ft), 1981–2010 normals, extremes 1943–present
Month	Jan	Feb	Mar	Apr	May	Jun	Jul	Aug	Sep	Oct	Nov	Dec	Year
Record high °C (°F)	27.0 (80.6)	23.0 (73.4)	23.0 (73.4)	28.0 (82.4)	28.0 (82.4)	28.0 (82.4)	28.0 (82.4)	27.0 (80.6)	27.0 (80.6)	23.5 (74.3)	26.0 (78.8)	25.6 (78.1)	28.0 (82.4)
Mean daily maximum °C (°F)	15.1 (59.2)	15.2 (59.4)	15.1 (59.2)	14.9 (58.8)	14.4 (57.9)	13.4 (56.1)	13.3 (55.9)	14.0 (57.2)	14.7 (58.5)	15.5 (59.9)	16.0 (60.8)	16.0 (60.8)	15.0 (59.0)
Daily mean °C (°F)	10.2 (50.4)	10.2 (50.4)	10.2 (50.4)	9.8 (49.6)	8.9 (48.0)	7.8 (46.0)	7.7 (45.9)	8.3 (46.9)	8.9 (48.0)	10.0 (50.0)	10.5 (50.9)	10.7 (51.3)	9.5 (49.1)
Mean daily minimum °C (°F)	5.3 (41.5)	5.2 (41.4)	5.3 (41.5)	4.8 (40.6)	3.4 (38.1)	2.2 (36.0)	2.1 (35.8)	2.7 (36.9)	3.2 (37.8)	4.5 (40.1)	5.1 (41.2)	5.4 (41.7)	4.0 (39.2)
Record low °C (°F)	−5.0 (23.0)	−4.0 (24.8)	−5.5 (22.1)	−6.5 (20.3)	−6.5 (20.3)	−7.5 (18.5)	−8.0 (17.6)	−9.0 (15.8)	−8.0 (17.6)	−7.0 (19.4)	−6.5 (20.3)	−4.5 (23.9)	−9.0 (15.8)
Average precipitation mm (inches)	184.7 (7.27)	113.0 (4.45)	111.5 (4.39)	52.4 (2.06)	16.0 (0.63)	11.5 (0.45)	9.2 (0.36)	16.7 (0.66)	28.7 (1.13)	45.5 (1.79)	63.4 (2.50)	108.8 (4.28)	780.7 (30.74)
Average precipitation days	19.4	13.6	13.3	7.8	2.4	2.3	1.7	2.8	5.2	6.5	8.1	13.0	97.1
Average snowy days	0.0	0.0	0.0	0.0	0.0	0.0	0.0	0.0	0.0	0.0	0.0	0.0	0.0
Average relative humidity (%)	66.5	66.0	66.1	62.7	57.6	56.7	55.0	56.2	56.0	56.6	57.3	60.7	59.4
Source: Servicio Nacional de Meteorología e Hidrología de Bolivia

== Gallery ==
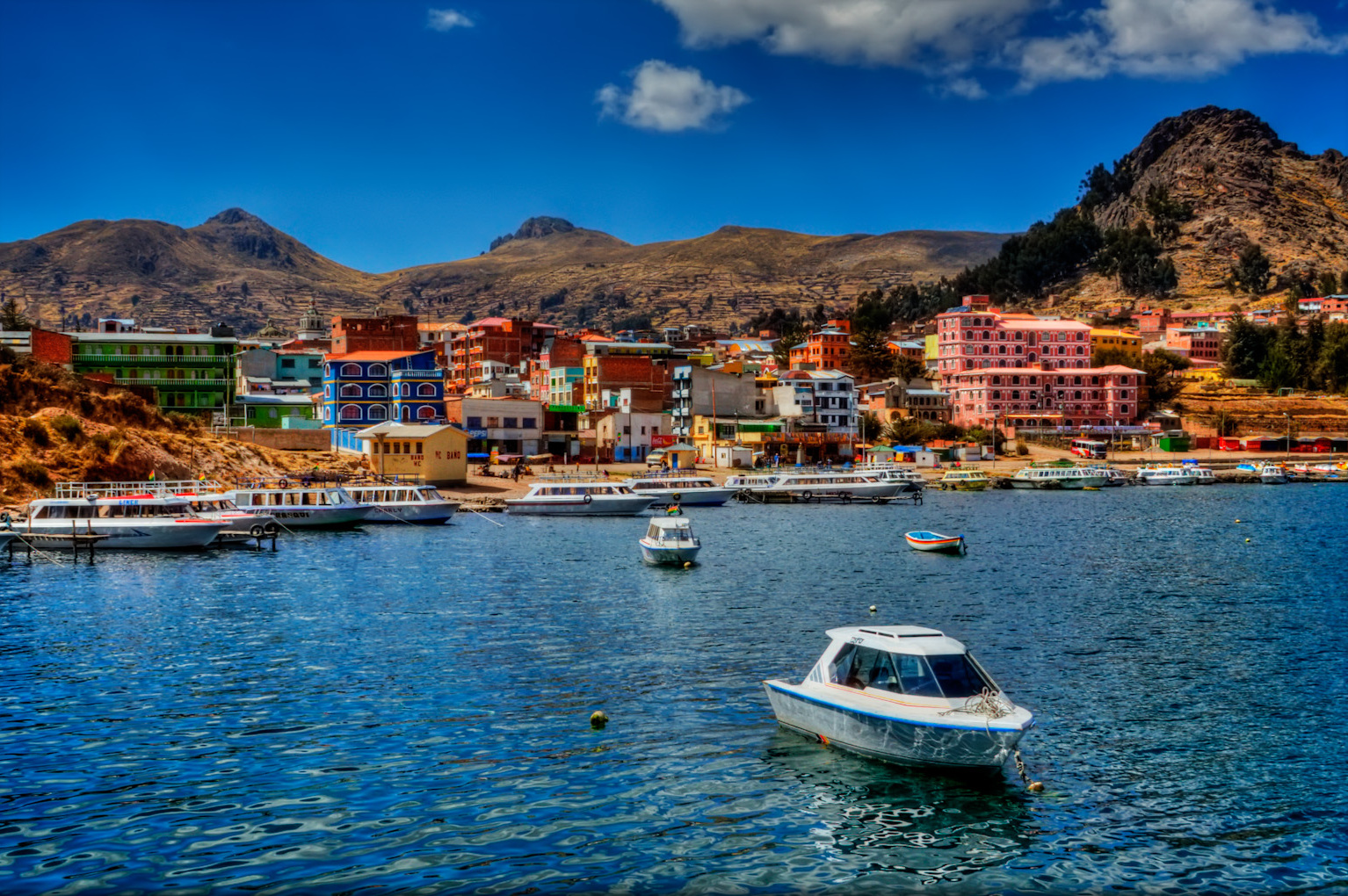
View of Copacabana from Lake Titicaca

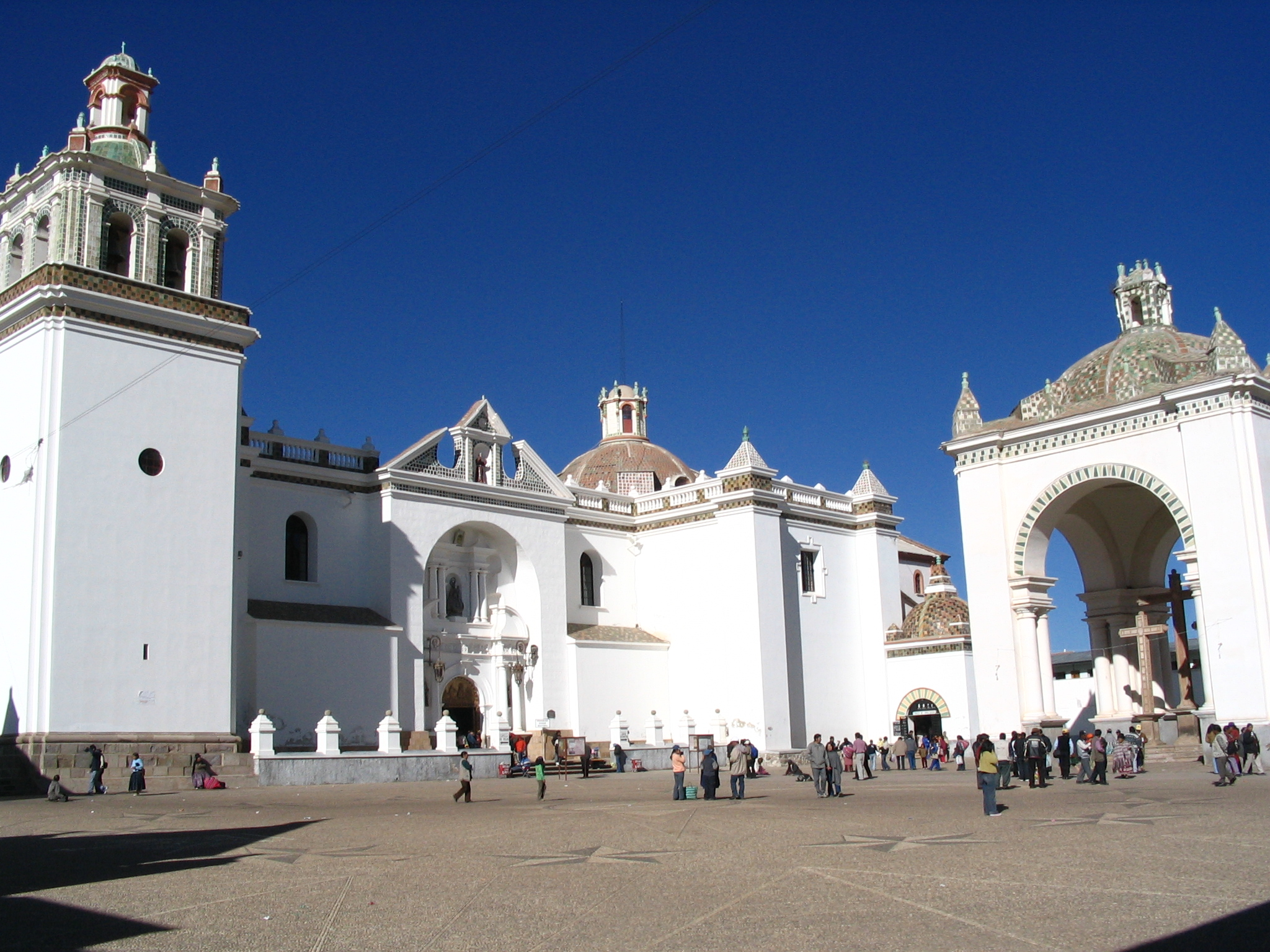
Copacabana's famous Basilica, Basilica of Our Lady of Copacabana.

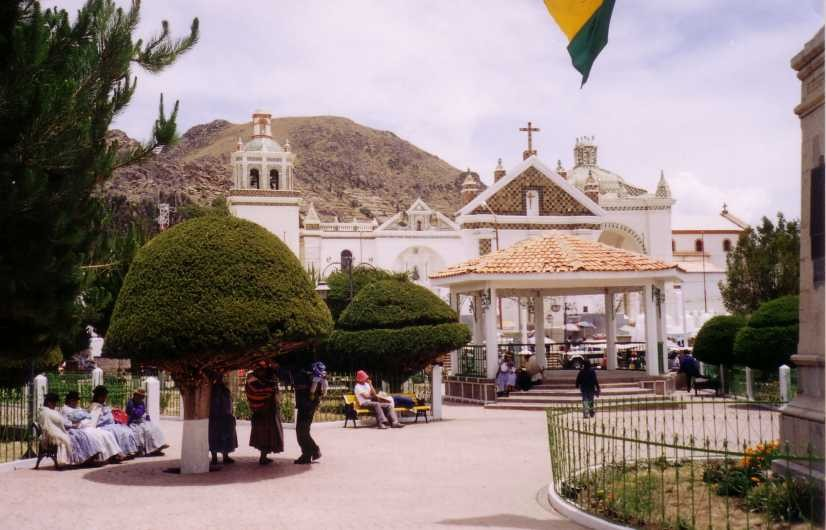
Copacabana with the Basilica.

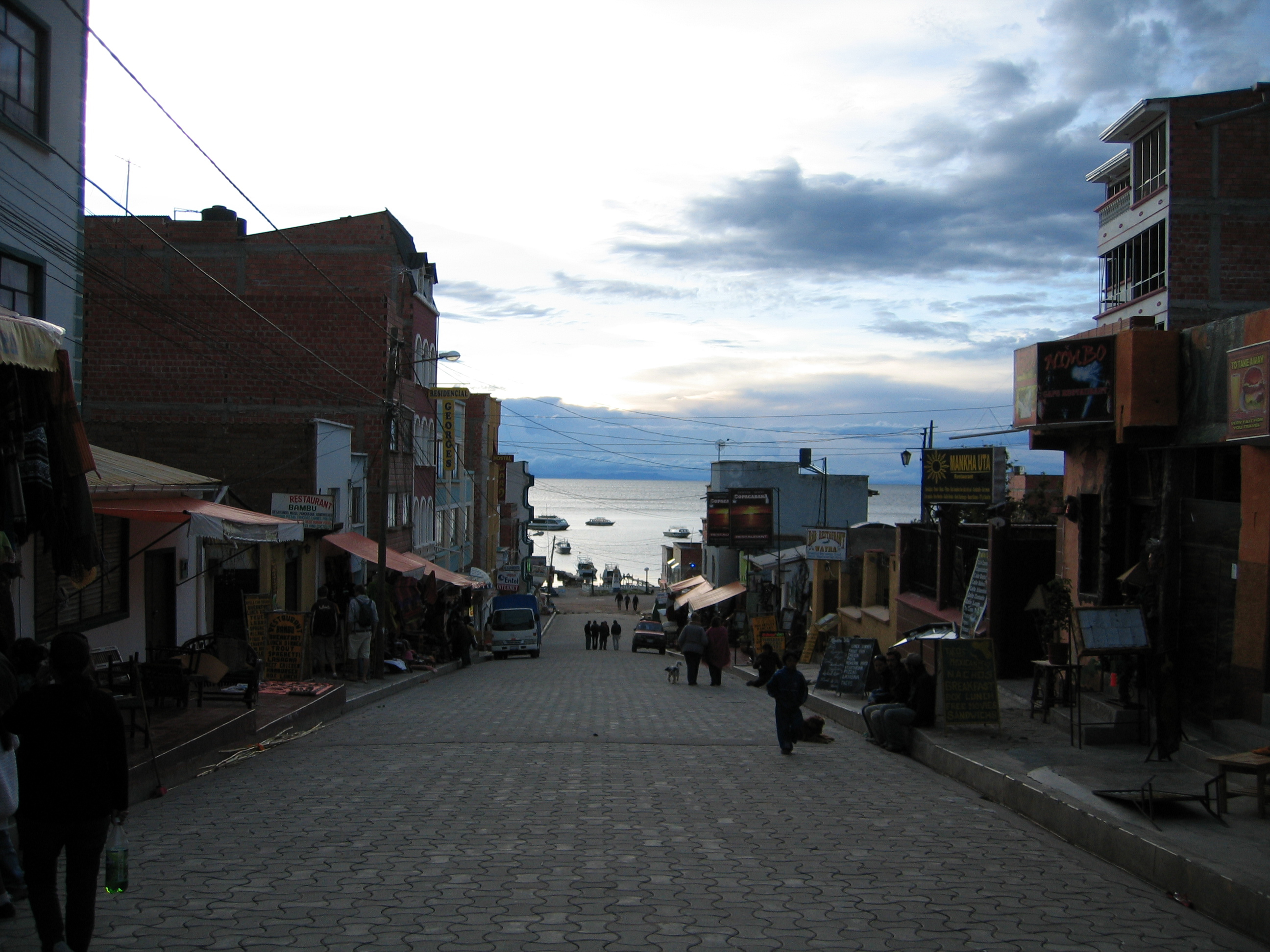
Shopping street with Lake Titicaca in the background.

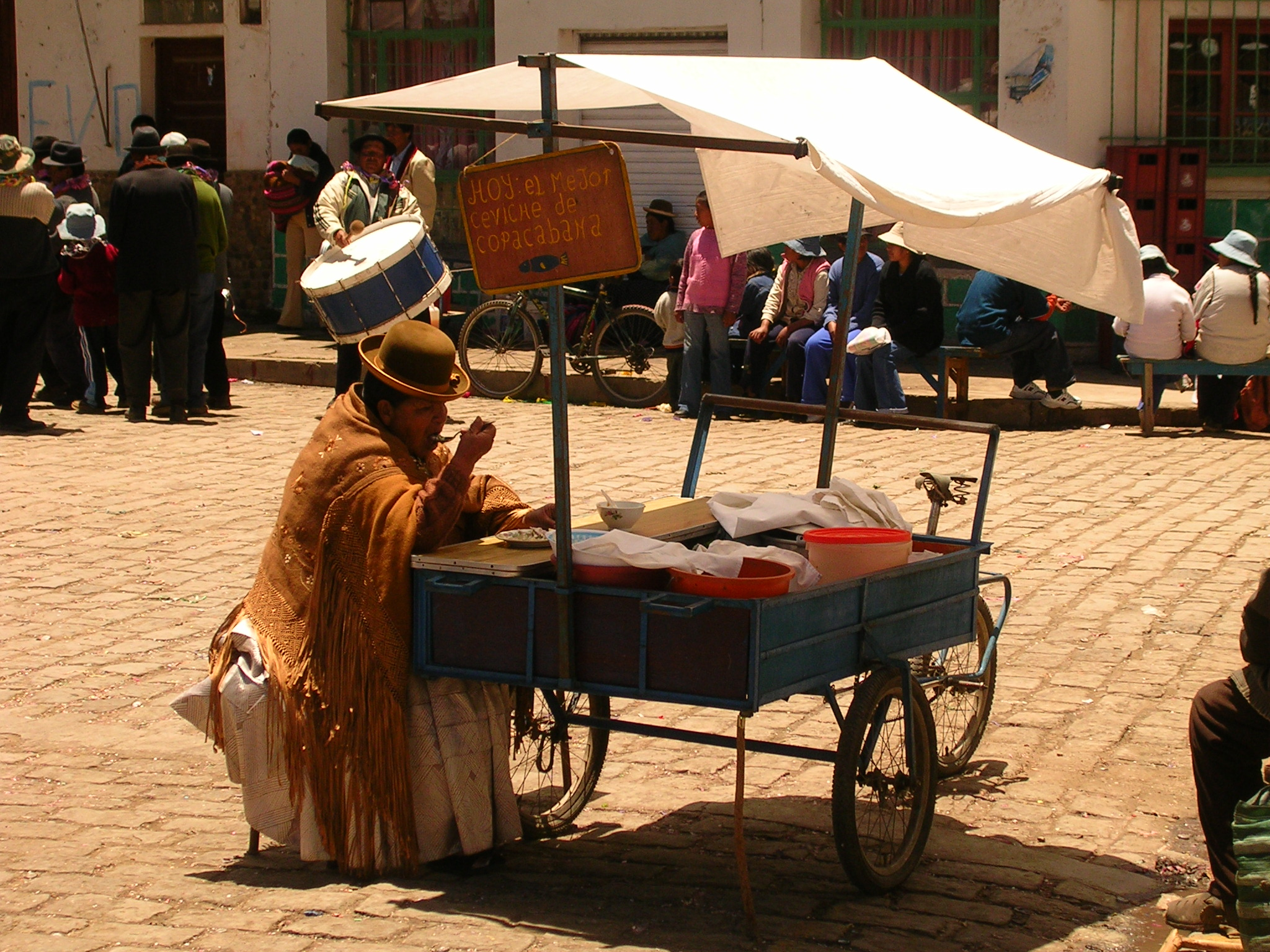
Copacabana.

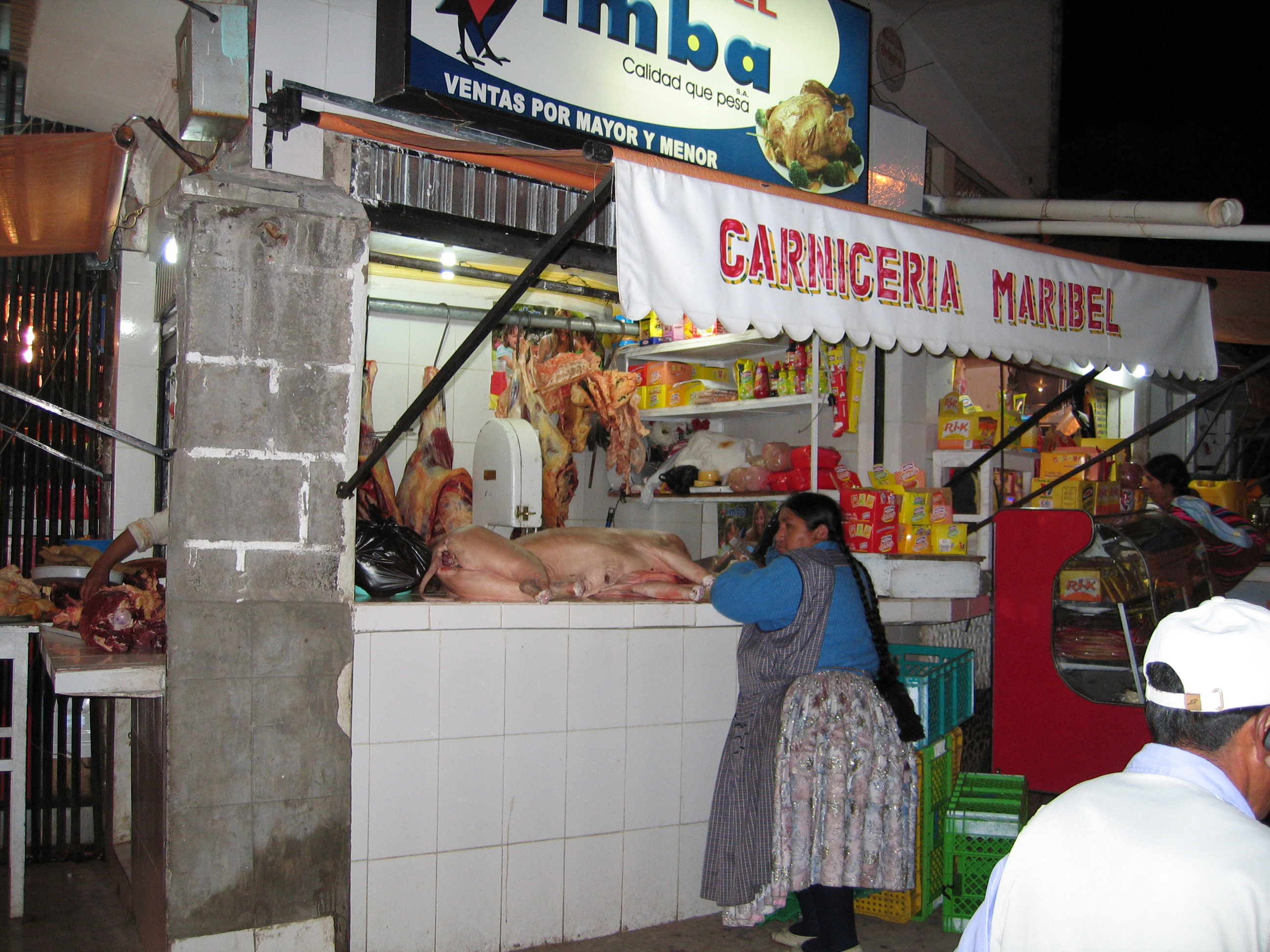
Street Butcher, Copacabana Bolivia

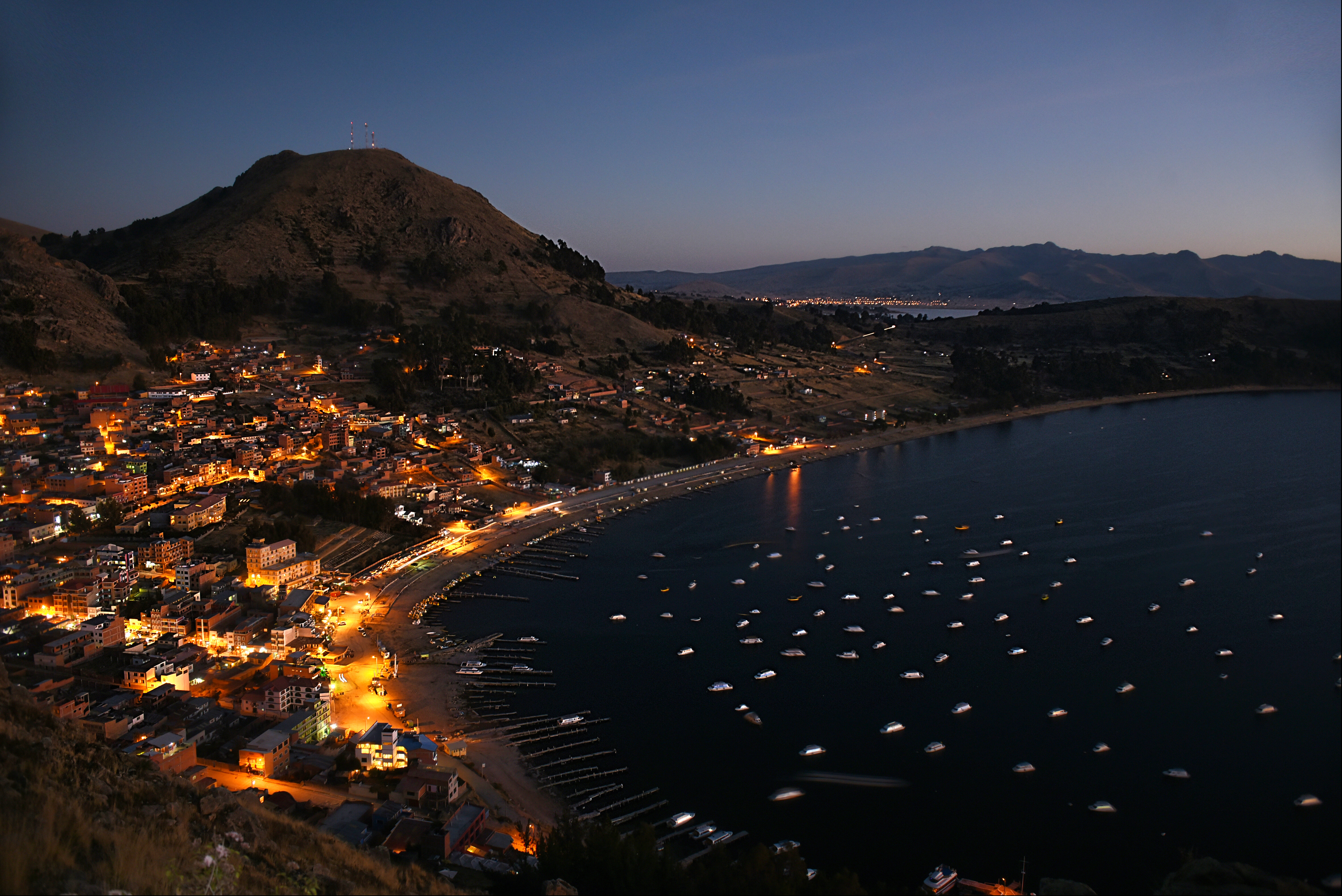
Copacabana on the shore of Lake Ticicaca at night

== Places of interest ==
- Chinkana
- Iñaq Uyu
- Pachat'aqa
