= Challapampa =

- Town
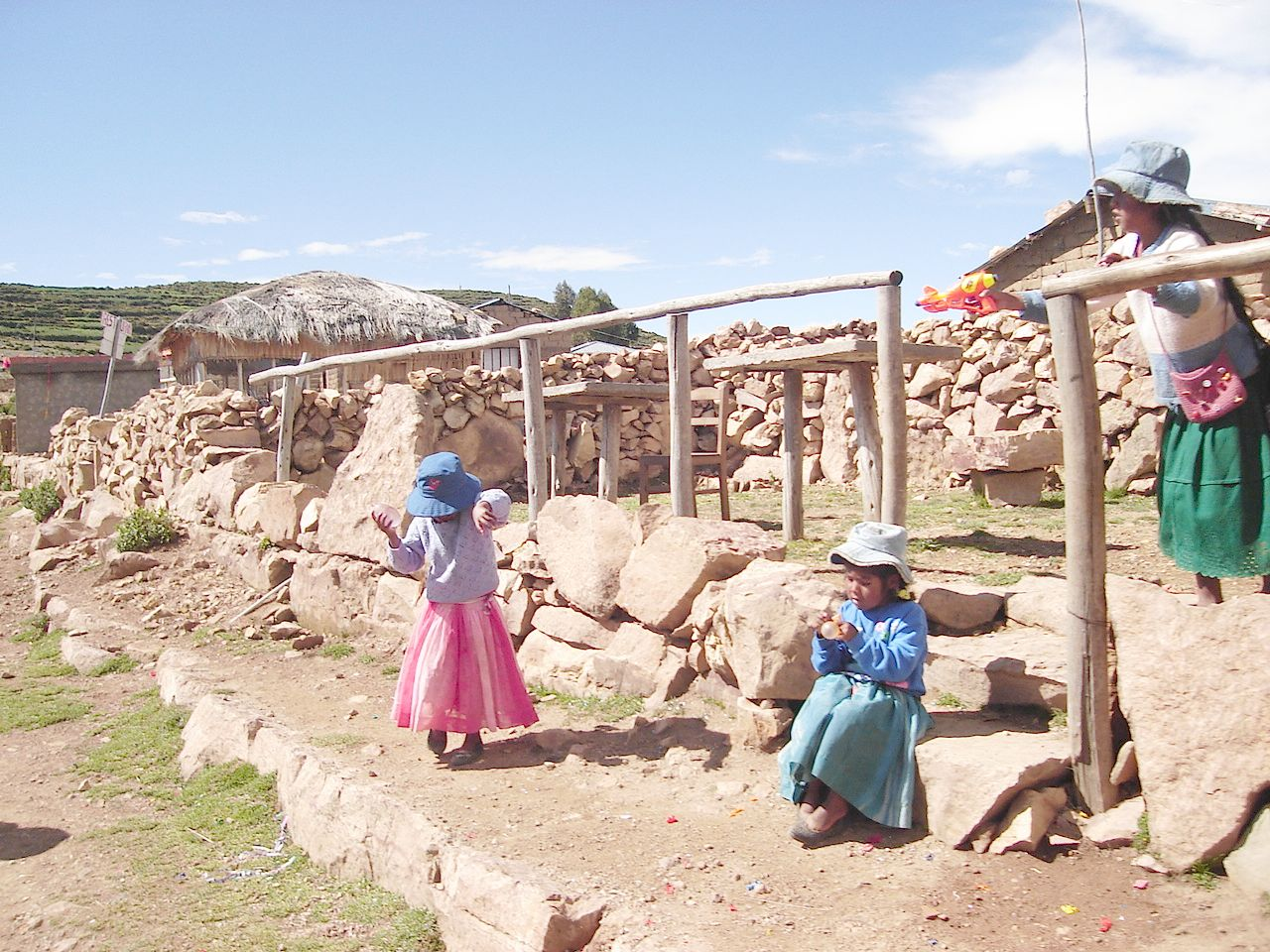

- Location in Bolivia
- Coordinates: 15°59′51″S 69°10′59.16″W
- Country: Bolivia
- Department: La Paz Department
- Province: Manco Kapac Province
- Municipality: Copacabana Municipality
- Elevation: 3,815 m (12,516 ft)

Population (2001)
  - Total: 435
- Time zone: UTC-4 (BOT)

Challapampa is a small town in Isla del Sol, Bolivia. In 2009 it had an estimated population of 435. The town neighbors the ruins called Chinkana, a former Incan settlement.
