= Iñaq Uyu =

Archaeological site in Bolivia

- Aklla Wasi
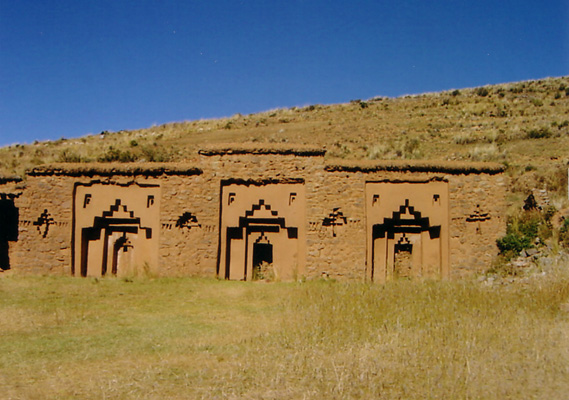
- Iñaq Uyu on the island of Isla de la Luna

- Location within Bolivia
- 16°02′18″S 69°04′15″W
- Location: Copacabana, Manco Kapac Province, La Paz Department, Bolivia
- Region: Andes

Iñaq Uyu (Aymara, iñaqa a woman of noble caste of the Incas, uyu pen (enclosure), yard, cemetery, "pen of the iñaqa, the woman of the noble caste of the Incas", other spellings Iñac Uyu, Iñac Uyo, Iñakuyu, Iñak Uyu, Iñak Uyo), also called Aklla Wasi (Quechua aklla chosen, selected, virgins of the sun, wasi house, "house of the virgins of the sun"), is an archaeological site in Bolivia situated on the Isla de la Luna, an island of Lake Titicaca. It is located in the La Paz Department, Manco Kapac Province, Copacabana Municipality. In Incan society, the societal structure was very rigid. Often those of belonging to the royal class structure did not mix with the lower classes.

Iñaq Uyu dates back to around 1000 C.E. to 1500 C.E. Like the other archaeological sites, Chinkana and Pillkukayna, Iñaq Uyu is located on an island of Lake Titicaca; however, Iñaq Uyu is situated on the Isla de la Luna, rather than the larger Isla Del Sol where Chinkana and Pillkukayna are situated.

The name, Iñaq Uyu, has a linguistic origin that speculates that the cemetery was probably used as a burial site for the Incan women of noble and aristocratic hierarchy. Iñaq Uyu's name roughly translates to "house of the virgins of the sun". This name may have been given because Iñaq Uyu is situated on the Isla de la Luna and away from the Isla Del Sol. Because Iñaq Uyu is away from the Isla Del Sol, it can be considered as a "virgin of the sun."

== See also ==
- Chinkana
- Pillkukayna
