= Copacabana Airport =

Airport in Bolivia

- IATA: none; ICAO: SLCC

Summary
- Airport type: Public
- Serves: Copacabana, Bolivia
- Elevation AMSL: 12,591 ft / 3,838 m
- Coordinates: 16°11′25″S 69°05′40″W

Map
- Location of Copacabana Airport in Bolivia

Runways
Direction	Length		Surface
Direction	m	ft	Surface
06/24	2,000	6,562	Gravel
- Source: Landings.com Google Maps GCM

Copacabana Airport (Spanish: Aeropuerto Copacabana, (ICAO: SLCC)) is an extremely high elevation airport serving Copacabana, a town on Lake Titicaca in the La Paz Department of Bolivia.

Town and airport are on a peninsula connected to Peru, with no land connection with Bolivia. The runway is 2 kilometres (1.2 mi) south of the town, in a dead-end valley that opens onto the lake. There is rising terrain in all quadrants except west-southwest, over the lake.

== See also ==
- Transport in Bolivia
- List of airports in Bolivia
