= Tito Yupanqui Municipality =

Tito Yupanqui Titu Yupanki
- Municipality
- Location within Bolivia
- Coordinates: 16°11′S 68°58′W
- Country: Bolivia
- Department: La Paz Department
- Province: Manco Kapac Province
- Seat: Tito Yupanqui
- Time zone: UTC-4 (BOT)

Tito Yupanqui Municipality is the third municipal section of the Manco Kapac Province in the La Paz Department, Bolivia. Its seat is Tito Yupanqui.
