= Isla de la Luna =

Island in Bolivia

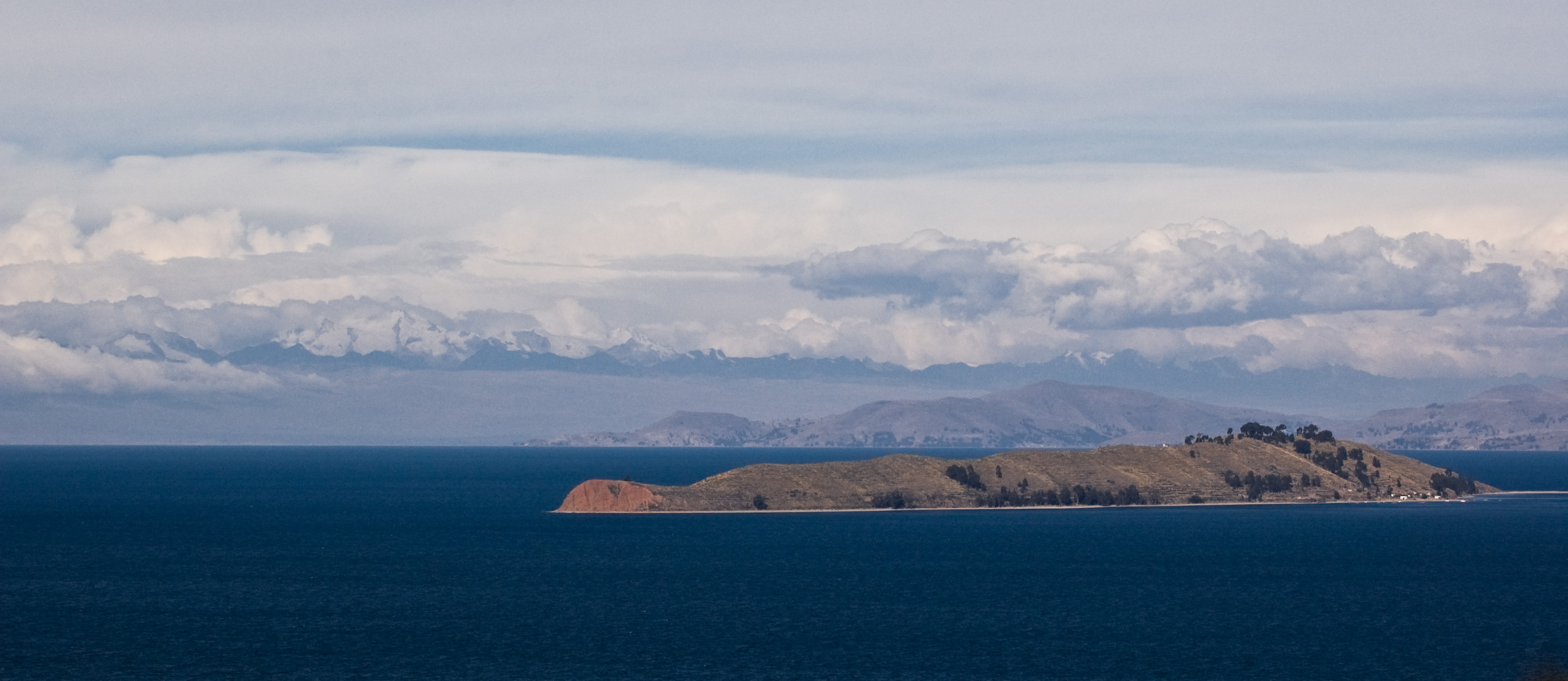
- View of Isla de la Luna from Isla del Sol
- Interactive map of Isla de la Luna

Geography
- Location: Lake Titicaca
- Coordinates: 16°02′25″S 69°04′15″W
- Area: 1.05 km^{2} (0.41 sq mi)
- Coastline: 6 km (3.7 mi)
- Highest elevation: 3,925 m (12877 ft)

Administration
- Bolivia

Demographics
- Population: 80

Isla de la Luna (translation: "Island of the Moon") is an island in La Paz Department, Bolivia. It is situated in Lake Titicaca, east of Isla del Sol ("Island of the Sun"). Legends in Inca mythology refer to the island as the location where Viracocha commanded the rising of the moon. Archeological ruins of an Inca nunnery were found on the eastern shore.

During the 20th century, the Bolivian Ministry of the Interior used the Isla de la Luna as a detention center for political prisoners. The prison, which had 30-foot adobe walls, was built between 1932 and 1935 by Paraguayan prisoners of war during the Chaco War. It was believed that escape from the island prison was nearly impossible given that the surrounding waters of Lake Titicaca were ice-cold, and even a skilled swimmer would die of hypothermia attempting to escape. Hence, it came to be known as the Alcatraz of the Andes. Nevertheless, through the decades there were a number of celebrated escapes from the island. In September 1949, Hernan Siles Zuazo, Emilio Sfeir, and others escaped, obtaining political asylum in Peru. Ironically, both Hernan Siles Zuazo and Emilio Sfeir had served in the Bolivian war effort during the Chaco War, the former as an infantry soldier, the latter as a counter-intelligence secret agent. On November 2, 1972, between 50 and 60 political prisoners, detained by the government of General Hugo Banzer following the August 1972 coup against General Juan Jose Torres, escaped from the prison and reached Peru.

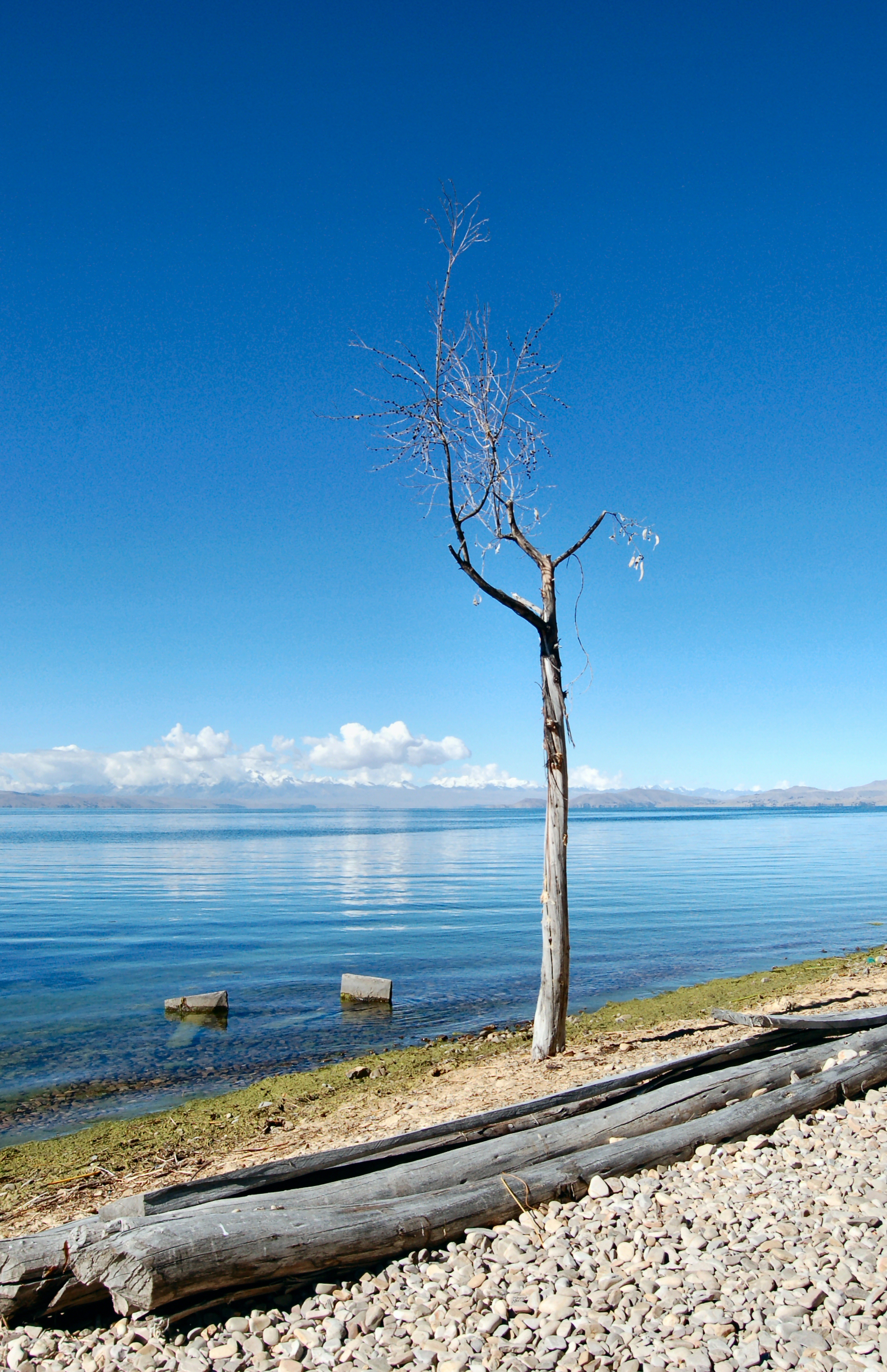
