= Tito Yupanqui, Bolivia =

Tito Yupanqui
- Town
- Location within Bolivia
- Coordinates: 16°11′S 68°57′W
- Country: Bolivia
- Department: La Paz Department
- Province: Manco Kapac Province
- Municipality: Tito Yupanqui Municipality

Population (2001)
  - Total: 773
- Time zone: UTC-4 (BOT)

Tito Yupanqui is a town in the La Paz Department, Bolivia. It was named after an indigenous artist, Francisco Tito Yupanqui, a 16th-century wood sculptor who sculpted a statue of the Mary, mother of Jesus, known as Our Lady of Candles (Nuestra Senora de la Virgen de Candelaria).
