= Pillkukayna =

Archaeological site in Bolivia

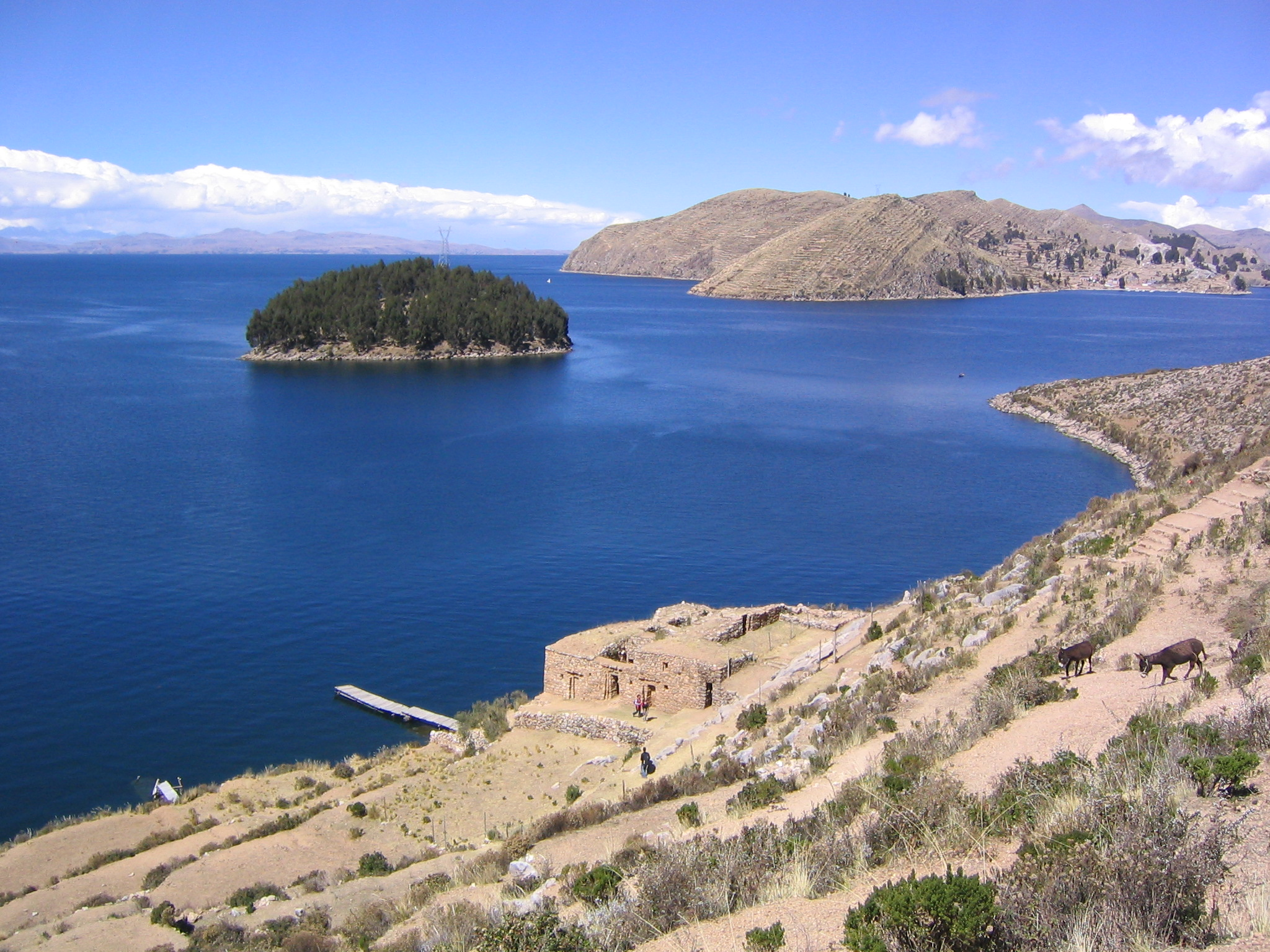
- Pillkukayna with Lake Titicaca, the strait of Yampupata and Chelleca island in the background
- Interactive map of Pillkukayna
- Location: Bolivia, La Paz Department, Manco Kapac Province, Copacabana Municipality
- Region: Lake Titicaca, Altiplano

Pillkukayna (other spellings Pilco Kayna, Pilcocayna, Pilko Kaina, Pilkokaina, Pillco Kayma) is an archaeological site on the shore of the island of Isla del Sol in the southern part of Lake Titicaca in Bolivia. It is situated in the La Paz Department, Manco Kapac Province, Copacabana Municipality.

== Gallery ==
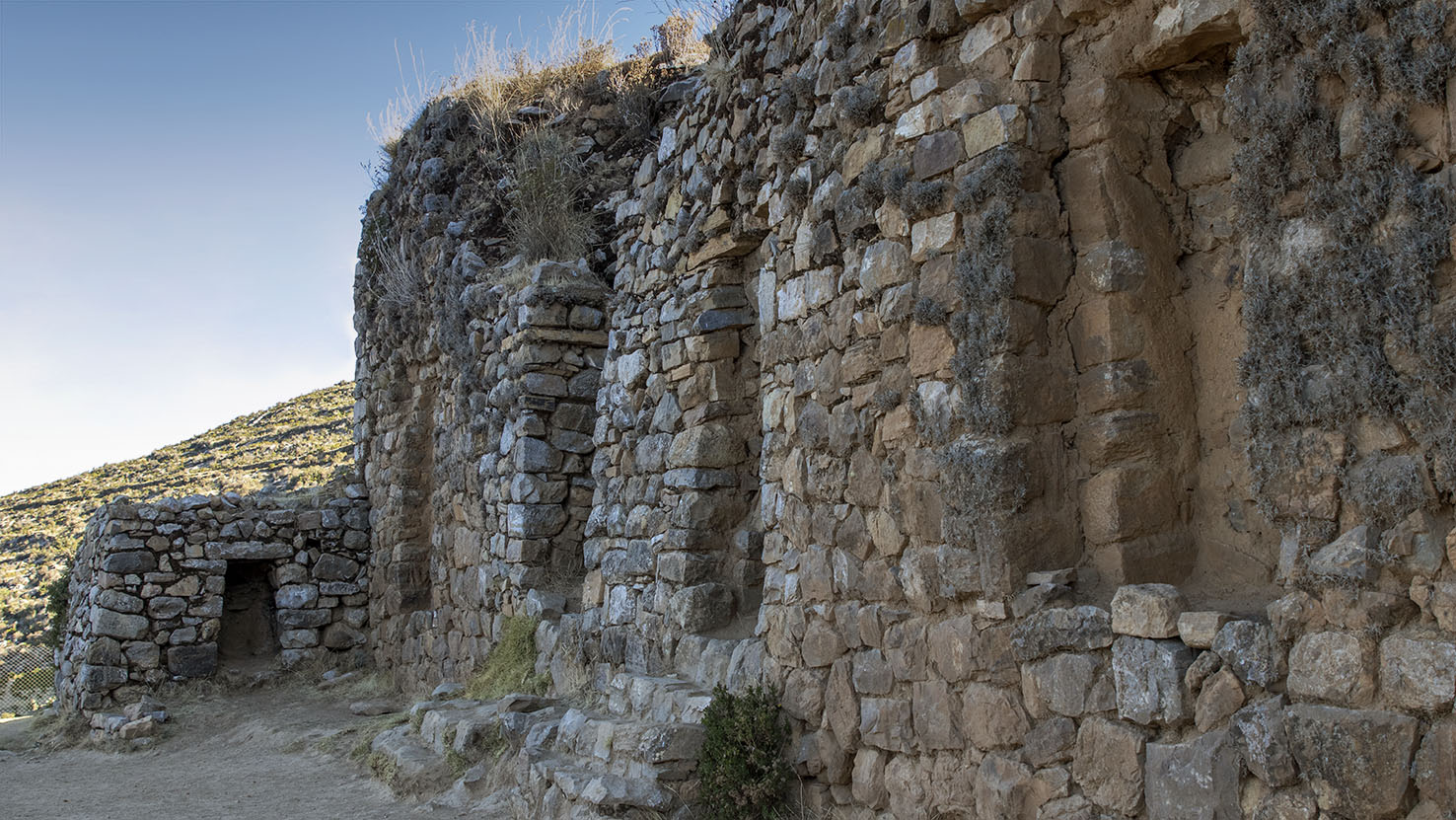

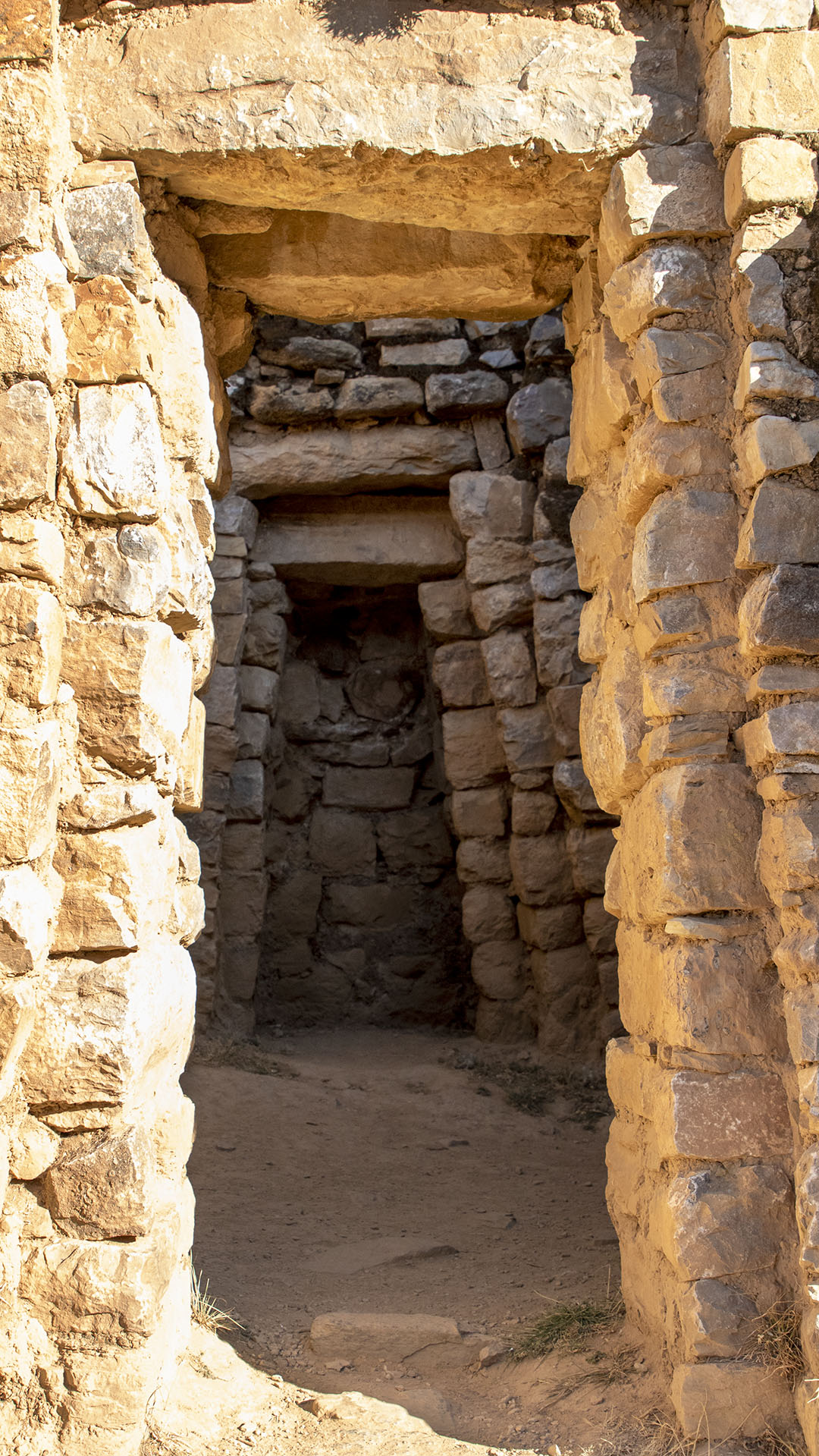

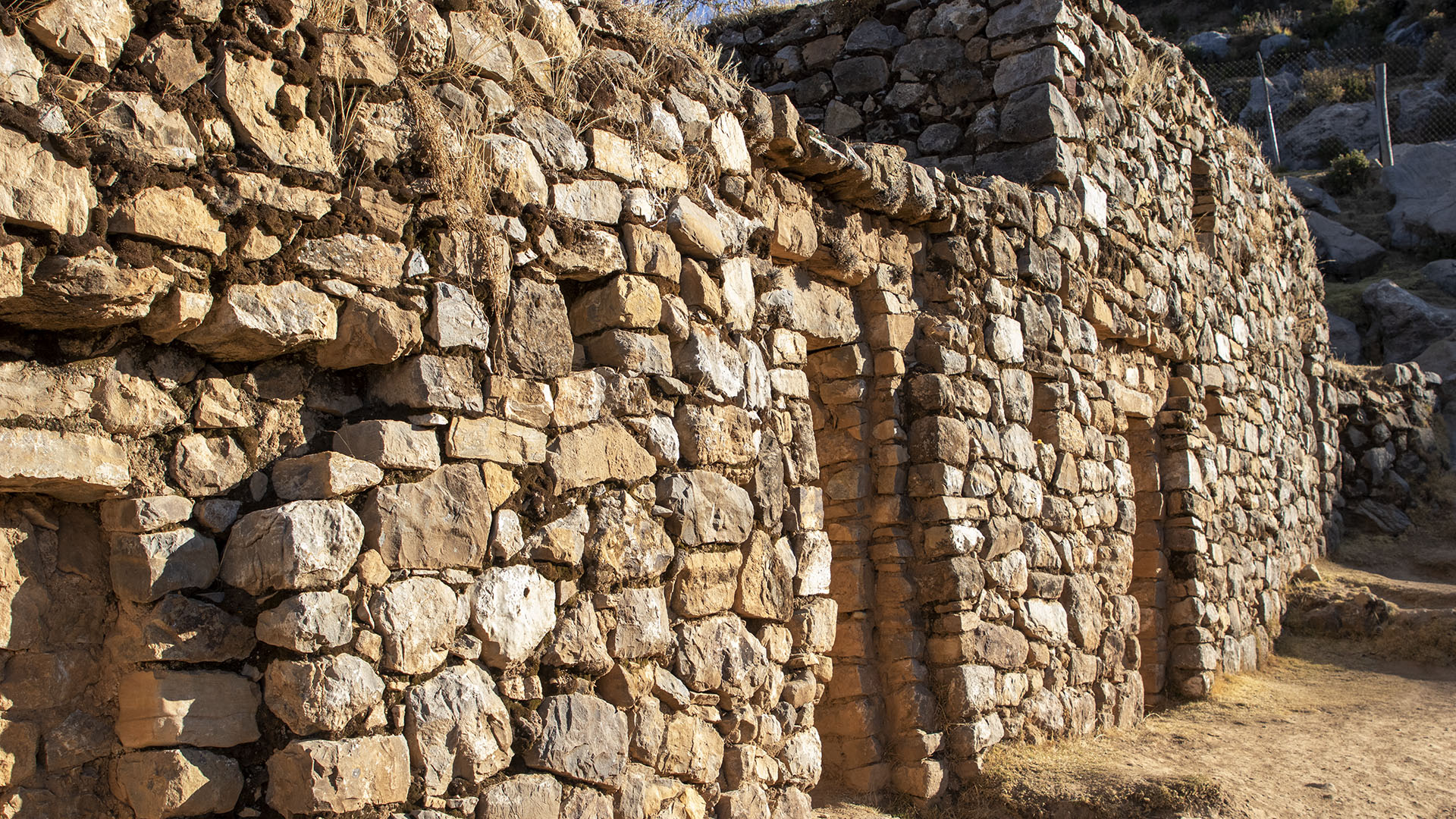

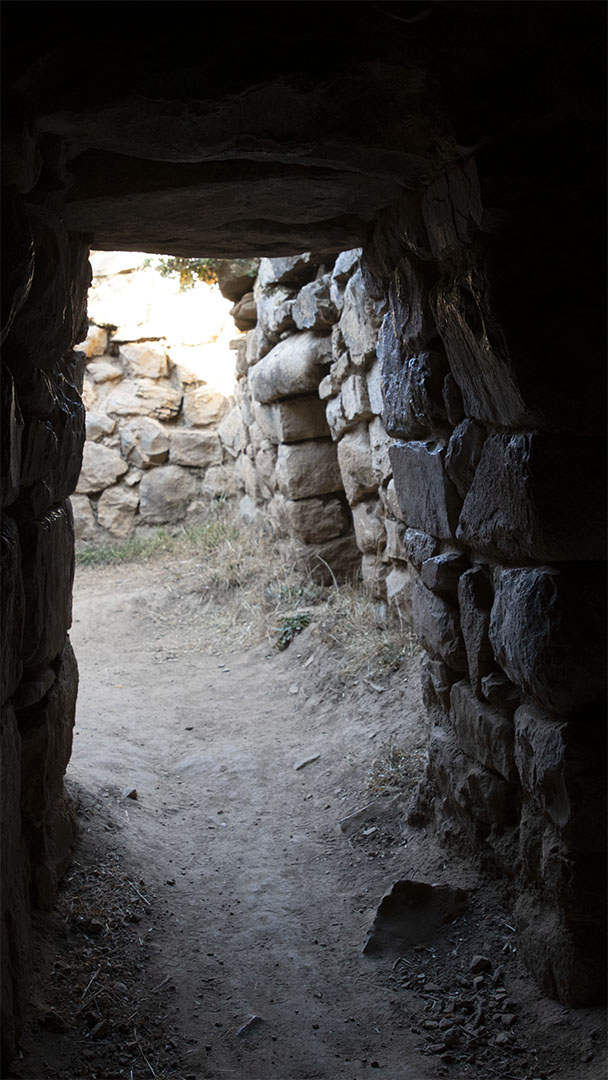

== See also ==
- Chinkana
- Iñaq Uyu
