= Manco Kapac Province =

Manco Kapac Manqu Qhapaq
- Province
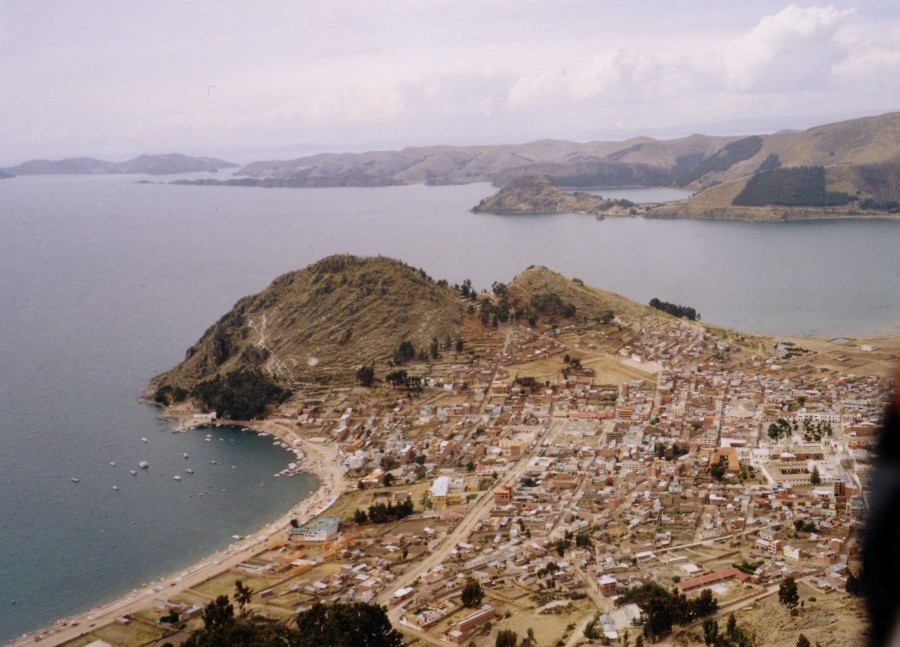
- Copacabana peninsula, Lake Titicaca

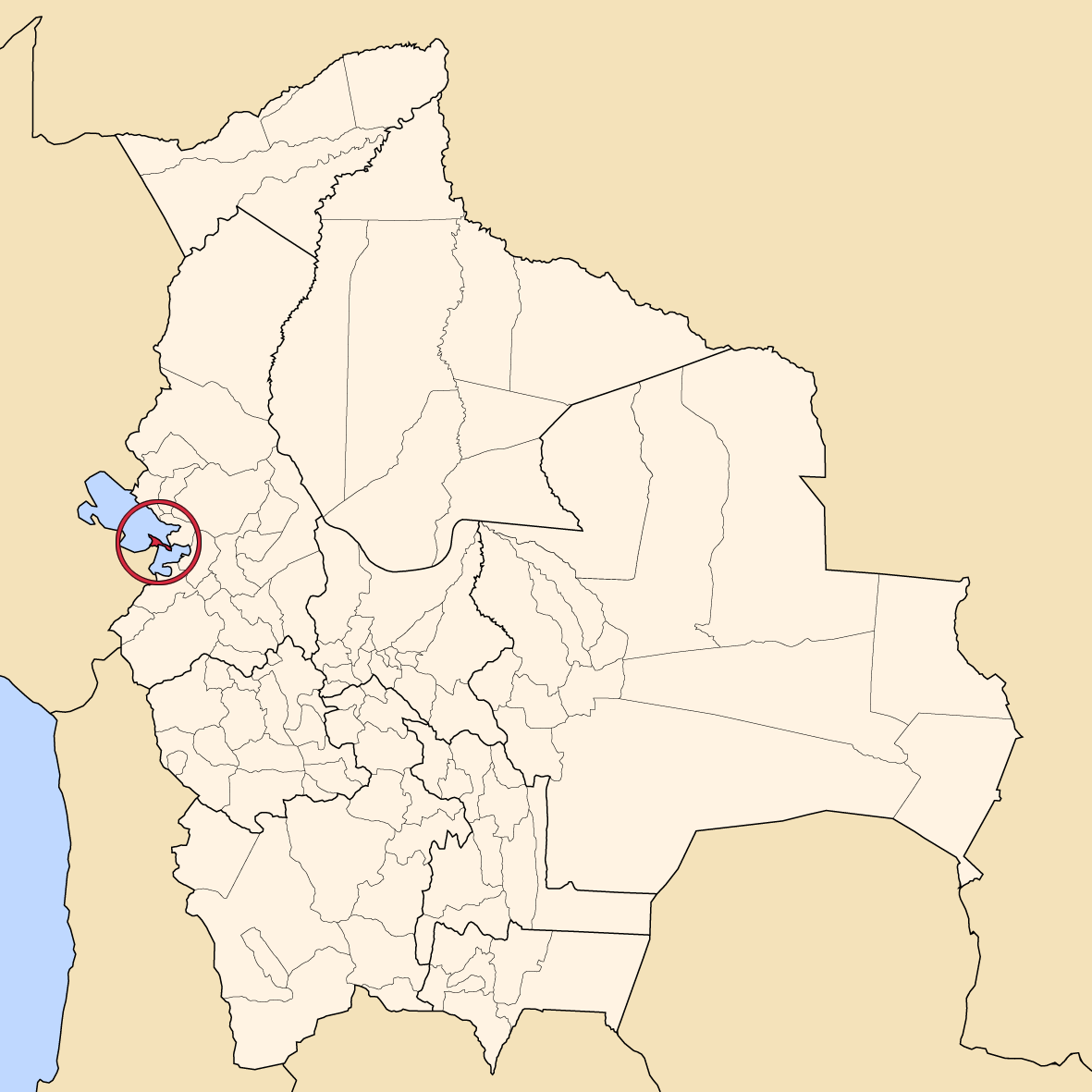
- Location of Manco Kapac Province within Bolivia

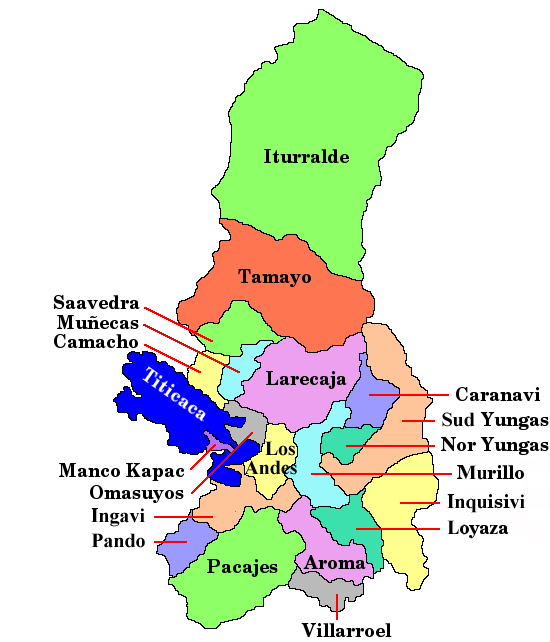
- Provinces of the La Paz Department
- Coordinates: 16°07′0″S 68°03′0″W
- Country: Bolivia
- Department: La Paz Department
- Municipalities: 3
- Capital: Copacabana

Area
  - Total: 367 km^{2} (142 sq mi)

Population (2024 census)
  - Total: 34,040
  - Density: 92.8/km^{2} (240/sq mi)
- Time zone: UTC-4 (BOT)

Manco Kapac is a province in the Bolivian department of La Paz. Its capital is Copacabana.

== Subdivision ==
Manco Kapac Province is divided into three municipalities which are partly further subdivided into cantons.

Section	Municipality	Seat
1st	Copacabana Municipality	Copacabana
2nd	San Pedro de Tiquina Municipality	San Pedro de Tiquina
3rd	Tito Yupanqui Municipality	Tito Yupanqui

== Places of interest ==
- Chinkana
- Iñaq Uyu
- Pachat'aqa
- Pillkukayna
- Yampupata Peninsula
