= Chinkana =

Archaeological site in Perú

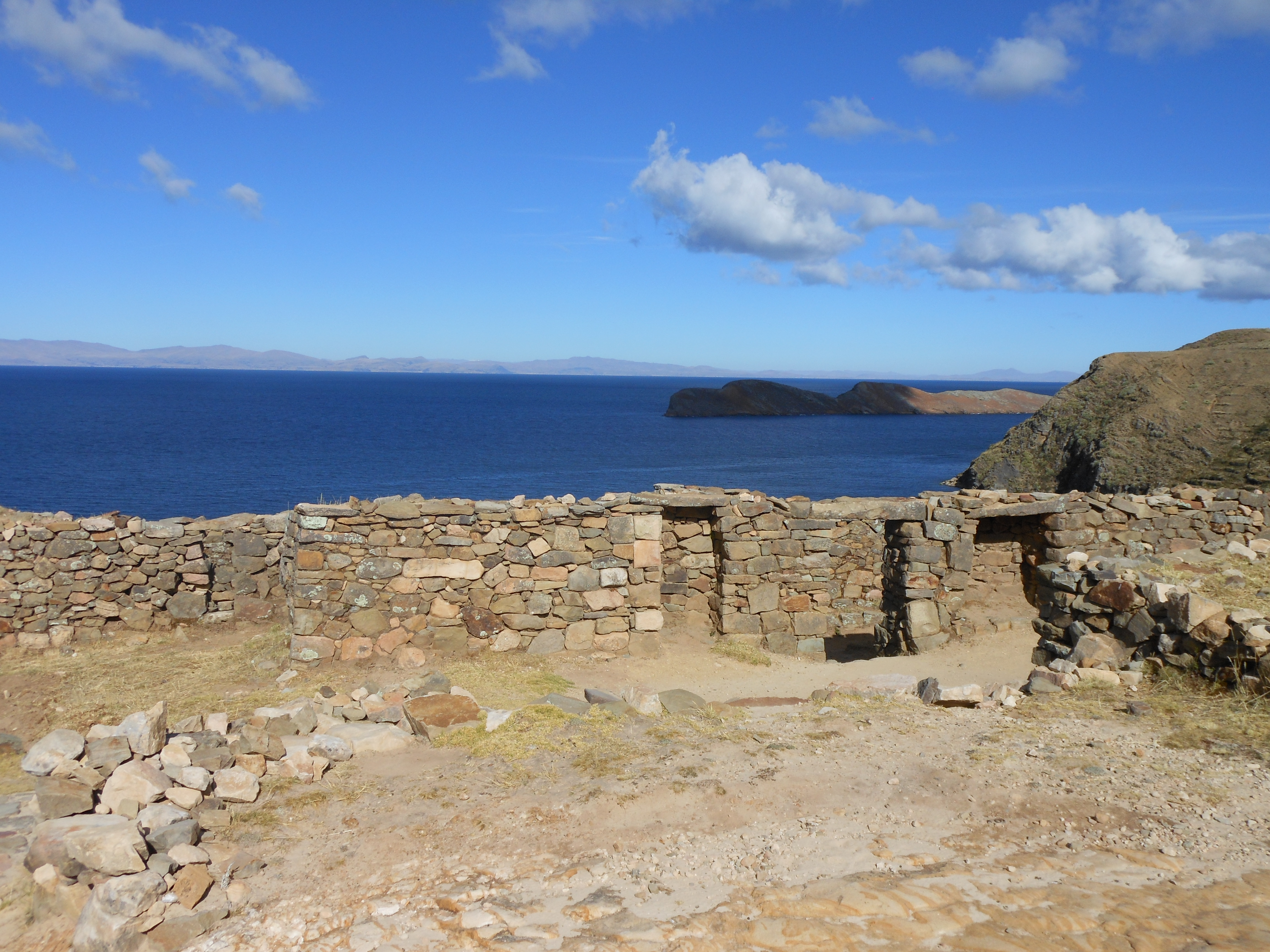
- Chinkana with Lake Titicaca and the island Qhuchiwat'a (Jochihuata) in the background
- Interactive map of Chinkana
- Location: Bolivia, La Paz Department, Manco Kapac Province
- Region: Andes

Chinkana (Quechua for labyrinth) is an archaeological site in Bolivia situated on the Isla del Sol, an island of Lake Titicaca. It is located in the La Paz Department, Manco Kapac Province, Copacabana Municipality.

== See also ==
- Iñaq Uyu
- Pillkukayna
