= Isla del Sol =

Island in the southern part of Lake Titicaca

Coordinates: 16°01′14″S 69°10′35″W

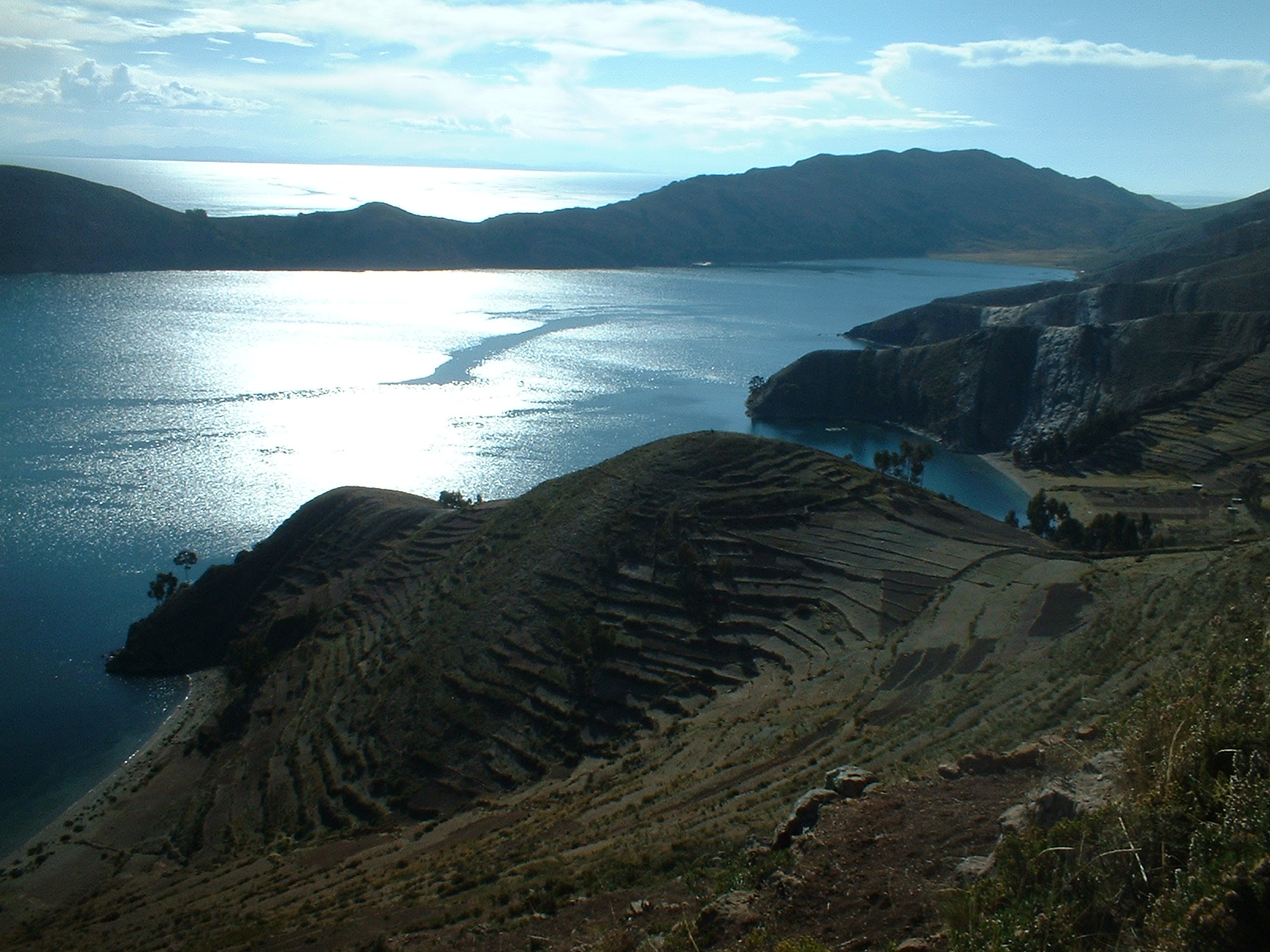
A view of the island

Isla del Sol (Spanish for "Island of the Sun") is an island in the southern part of Lake Titicaca. It is part of Bolivia, and specifically part of the La Paz Department. Geographically, the terrain is harsh; it is a rocky, hilly island with many eucalyptus trees. There are no motor vehicles or paved roads on the island. The main economic activity of the approximately 800 families on the island is farming, with fishing and tourism augmenting the subsistence economy. Of the several villages, Yumani and Challapampa are the largest.

There are over 80 ruins on the island. Most of these date to the Inca period circa the 15th century AD. Archaeologists have discovered evidence that people lived on the island as far back as the third millennium BC. Many hills on the island contain agricultural terraces, which adapt steep and rocky terrain to agriculture. Among the ruins on the island are Titi Qala (Aymara titi Andean mountain cat; lead, lead-colored, qala stone, "mountain cat stone" or "lead stone", also spelled Titikala), a labyrinth-like building called Chinkana, Q'asa Pata, and Pillkukayna. In the religion of the Incas, it was believed that the sun god was born here.

== Etymology ==
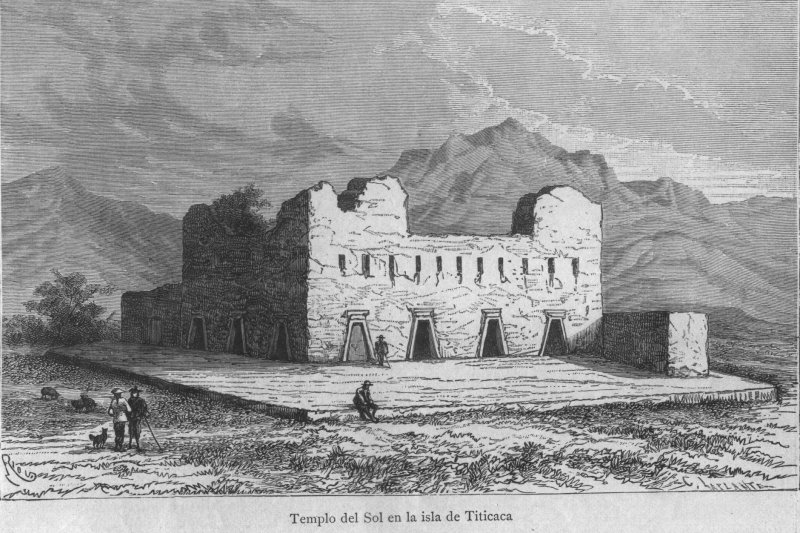
Drawing of Templo del Sol (as seen in 1887) on the Isla del Sol, where the mummified body of Manco Cápac came to rest.

The Aymara name for the island is Titi'kaka. The original meaning of this word is not known. Some linguists and archaeologists believe the name to be a corruption of titi (Andean mountain cat; lead, lead-colored) and qala (rock). In the 1612 Aymara-Spanish dictionary of Ludovico Bertonio, the phrase Tahksi kala is listed as "piedra fundamental" or "foundation stone" possibly alluding to the origin story of the Inca that the Sun and Moon were born in the lake.

== History ==
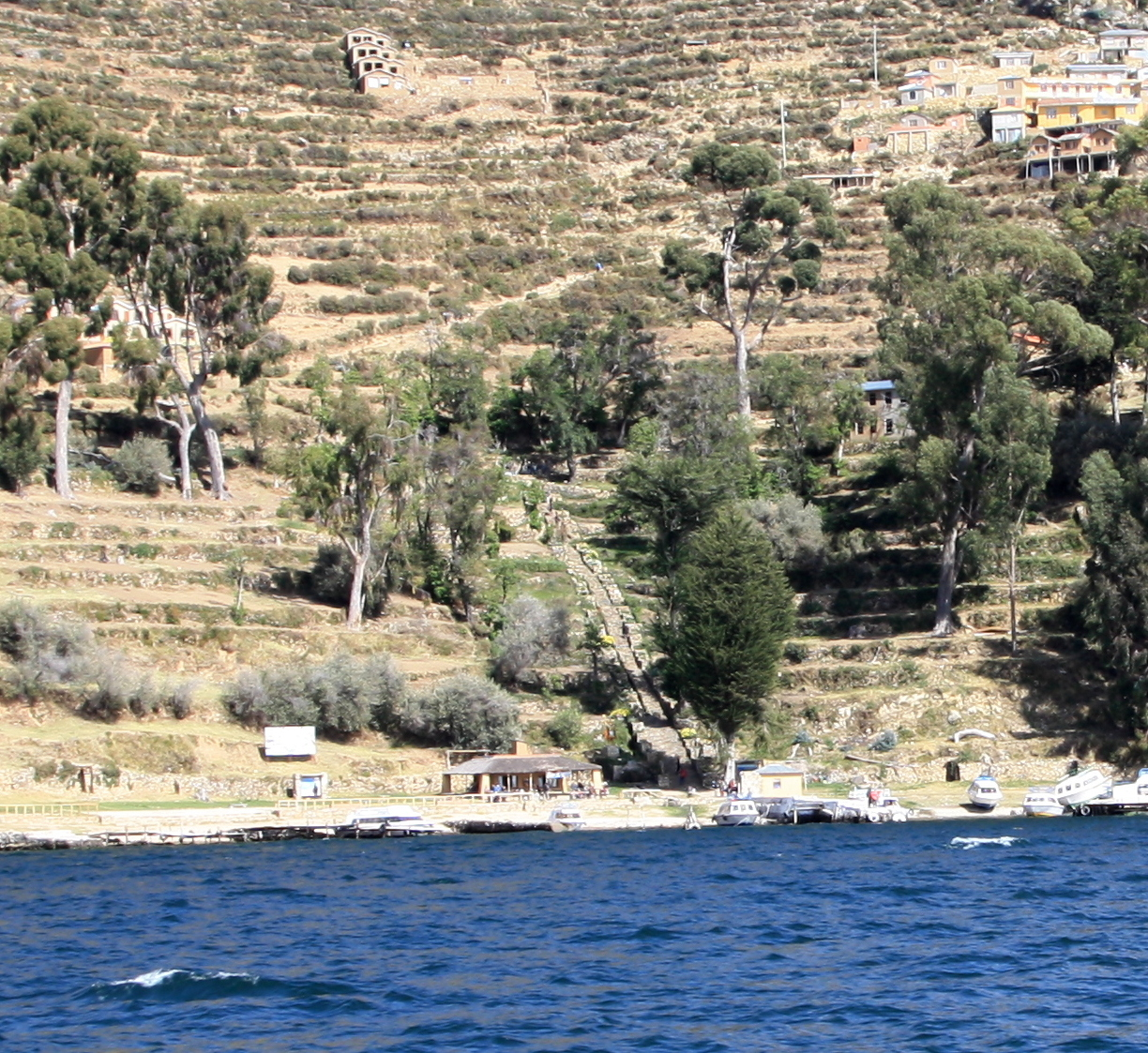
Inca stairs in Yumani, Isla del Sol

The chronicler Bernabé Cobo documented two versions of an Inca origin myth that took place on the northern part of this island. The first Inca Manco Cápac is said to have emerged from a prominent crag in a large sandstone outcrop known as Titi Qala. Manco Cápac is the son of Inti the Andean deity identified as the sun. In one version of the myth, the ancient people of the province were without light in the sky for many days and grew frightened of the darkness. Finally, the people saw the Sun emerge from the crag and believed it was the Sun's dwelling place. In another version related by Cobo, others believed the crag was dedicated to the Sun because it hid under the crag during a great Flood. Isla del Sol was the first land that appeared after the flood waters began to recede and the Sun emerged from Titi Qala to illuminate the sky once again. A temple was built at this rock and later expanded by the 10th Inca Tupac Inca Yupanqui. He built a convent for mamaconas (chosen women) and a tambo (inn) for visiting pilgrims.

== Archaeology ==
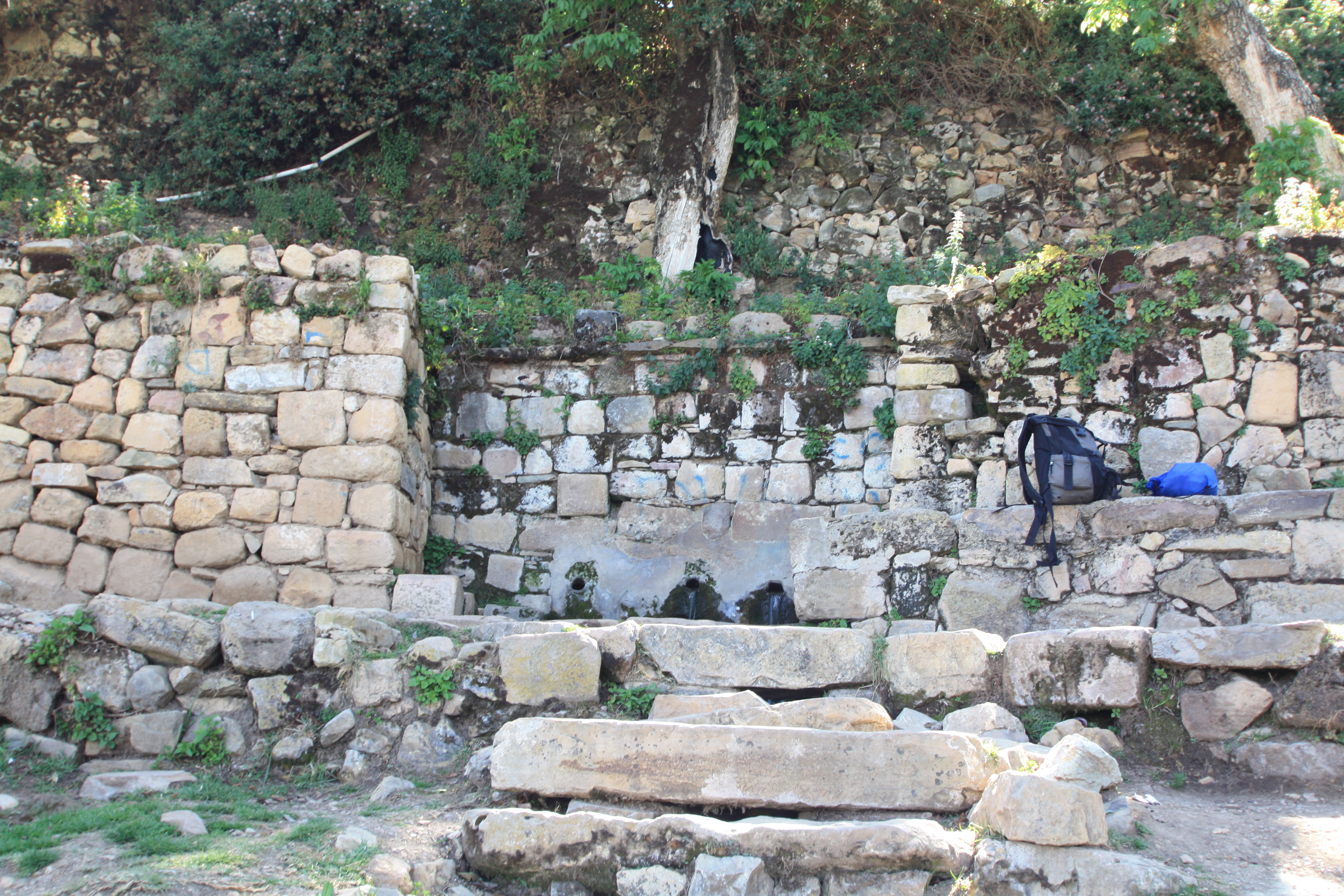
Inca fountain in Yumani, Isla del Sol

Excavations at the archaeological site of Ch'uxu Qullu, located on a small peak above the Bay of Challa, led to the recovery of Archaic Preceramic remains that radiocarbon dated to about 2200 BC. Eight obsidian flakes were recovered from this context, and Neutron Activation Analysis of three of the flakes revealed that all of them were from the Chivay obsidian source which is located in the Colca Canyon, Department of Arequipa. The presence of Chivay obsidian is clear evidence that inhabitants of the island were participating in a wider network of exchange.

Chivay obsidian has also been used at a nearby archaeological site, Jisk'a Iru Muqu, located on Peruvian territory. This indicates cultural continuity between these two sites in the same preceramic time frame.

=== Geological studies ===
According to one bathymetric model, there is no path between the shore edge and the Island of the Sun that does not pass over areas where the lake bottom reaches a depth of 200 m (660 ft) or greater. Paleoclimate studies indicate that around 3100 BC the level of Lake Titicaca would have been as much as 85 m (279 ft) lower than modern conditions, but that it had reached near modern levels by about 2000 BC. Thus, at 2200 BC lake levels were probably lower than at present but still high enough that the island was separated by water from the mainland. Data from Ch'uxuqullu therefore indicates that the lake shore cultures were using well-developed watercraft technology during the Archaic period.

=== Occupation history ===
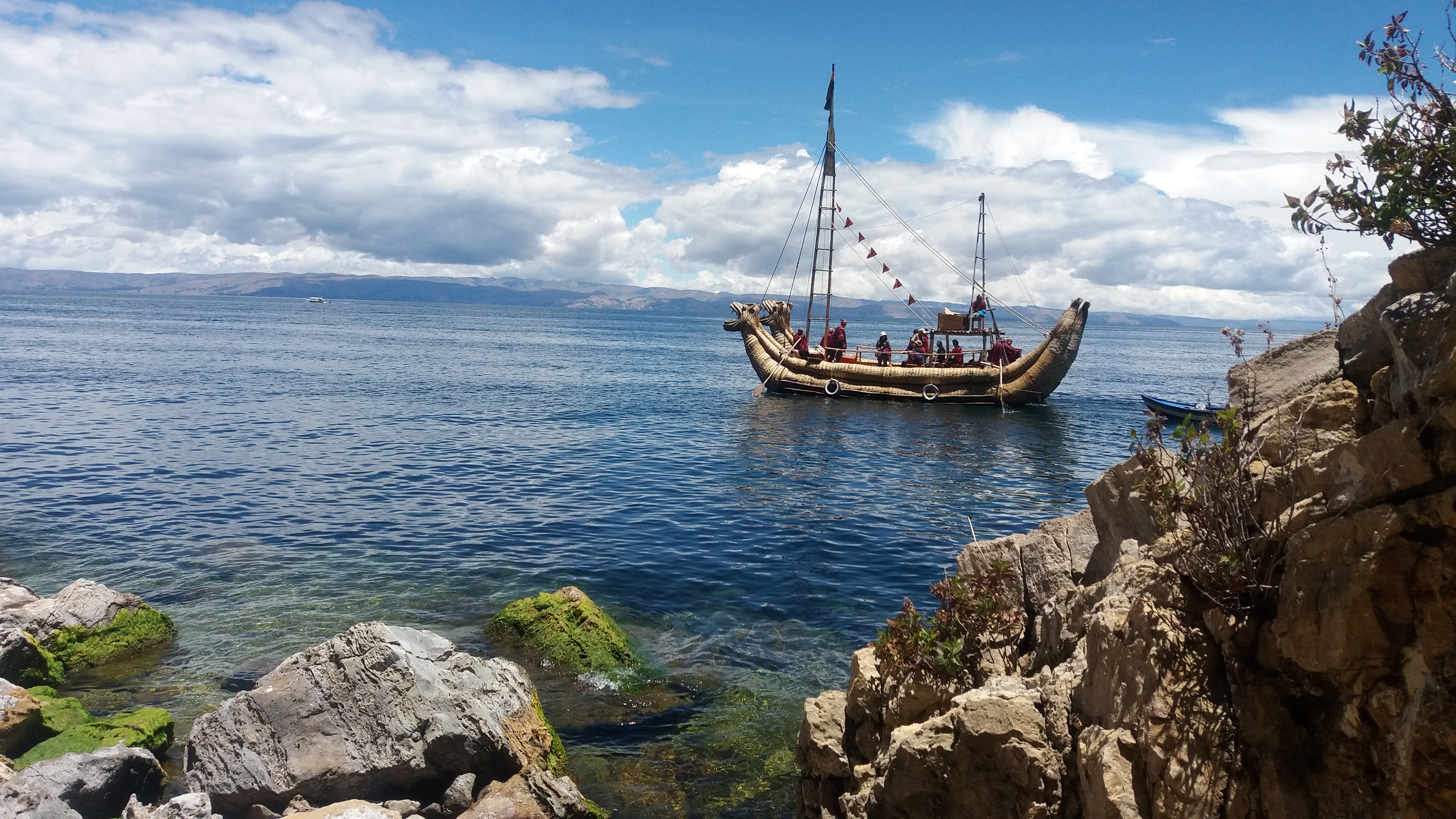
A reed boat near the island

The island was continually occupied from at least 2200 BC up to the present day. There is a significant Early Formative occupation (1800-1100 BC), Middle Formative (1100-500 BC) and Upper Formative (500 BC - AD 500).

The earliest recorded pottery on the island dates to between 1426 and 1316 B.C.

Most significantly, there is a major Tiwanaku (Tiahuanaco) settlement on the island. The site of Chucaripupata was a major Tiwanaku ritual site located above the Titi Qala, that the Incas made famous.

All these sites are located on the western side of the island.

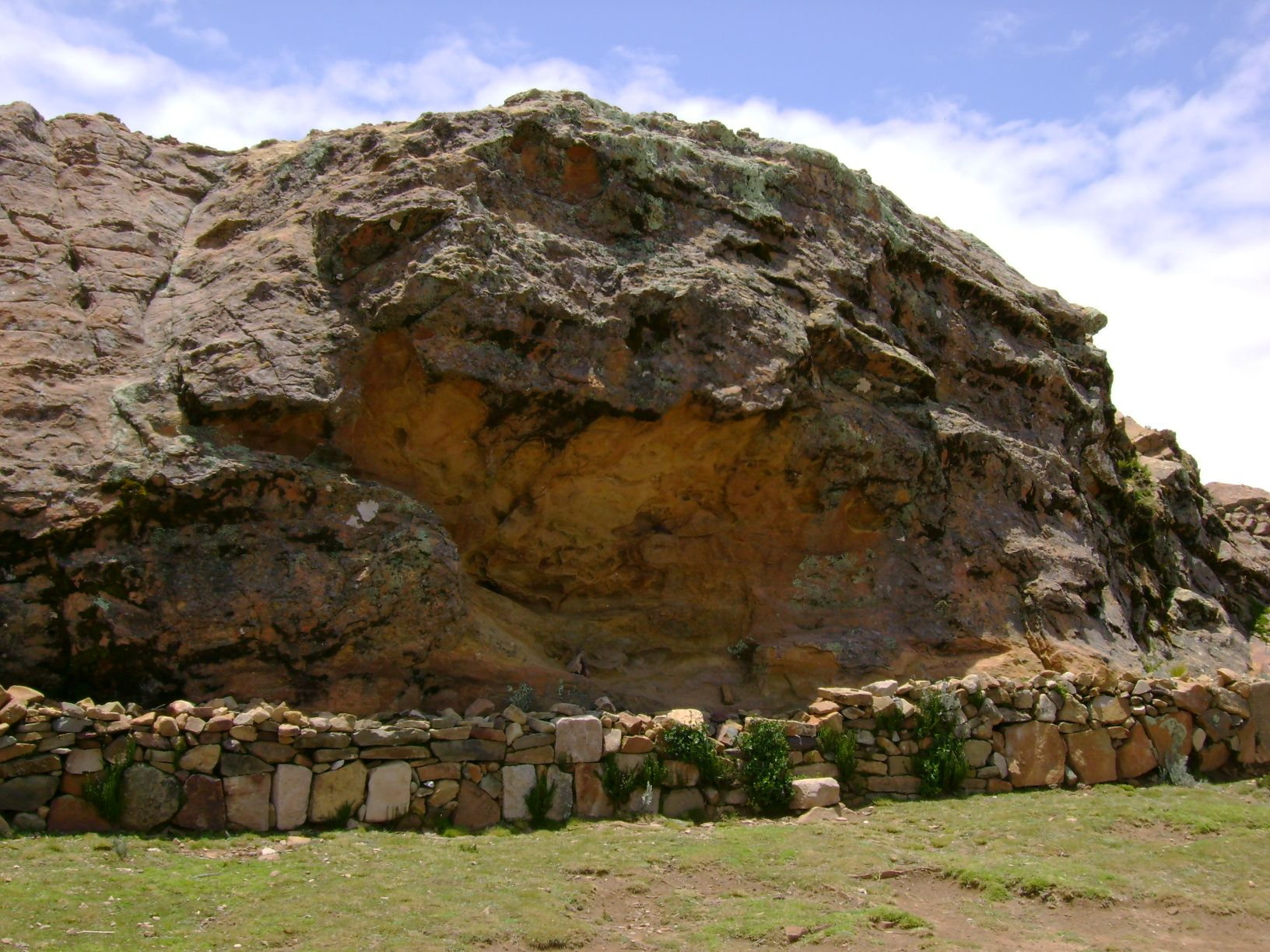
Titi Qala, the island location sacred to the Incas

Chucaripupata is only a few hundred meters from Titi Qala, and immediately above them is a rock outcrop known as Murokata. It is therefore possible that Murokata was the "sacred rock" of the Tiwanaku culture.

The archaeological evidence indicates that neither Murokata nor Titi Qala were used during the Late Intermediate Period (ca AD 1000–1450). With the conquest of the southern Titicaca region by the Inca, the Titi Qala zone was converted into one of the most important pilgrimage destinations in the Inca state on par with the famous oracle at Pachacamac on the coast just south of Lima.

Underwater archaeological investigations conducted off the Island of the Sun from 1989 to 1992 led to the discovery of both Inca and Tiahuanaco artifacts. These are now on display at a site museum in Challapampa. Today the economy of the island is mainly driven by tourism revenues, but subsistence agriculture and fishing are widely practiced.

== Climate ==
Climate data for Isla de Sol (located in Yumani), elevation: 3,976 metres (13,045 ft), 1981–2010 normals, extremes 1978–present
Month	Jan	Feb	Mar	Apr	May	Jun	Jul	Aug	Sep	Oct	Nov	Dec	Year
Record high °C (°F)	21.0 (69.8)	21.0 (69.8)	20.0 (68.0)	21.0 (69.8)	20.0 (68.0)	19.8 (67.6)	19.2 (66.6)	20.4 (68.7)	20.9 (69.6)	23.0 (73.4)	24.6 (76.3)	21.0 (69.8)	24.6 (76.3)
Mean daily maximum °C (°F)	14.4 (57.9)	14.4 (57.9)	14.6 (58.3)	14.4 (57.9)	14.3 (57.7)	13.7 (56.7)	13.4 (56.1)	13.9 (57.0)	14.5 (58.1)	15.0 (59.0)	15.2 (59.4)	15.1 (59.2)	14.3 (57.7)
Daily mean °C (°F)	9.4 (48.9)	9.5 (49.1)	9.5 (49.1)	9.4 (48.9)	9.0 (48.2)	8.2 (46.8)	7.9 (46.2)	8.4 (47.1)	9.0 (48.2)	9.6 (49.3)	9.7 (49.5)	9.8 (49.6)	9.1 (48.4)
Mean daily minimum °C (°F)	4.4 (39.9)	4.5 (40.1)	4.5 (40.1)	4.4 (39.9)	3.6 (38.5)	2.7 (36.9)	2.5 (36.5)	3.0 (37.4)	3.5 (38.3)	4.1 (39.4)	4.4 (39.9)	4.5 (40.1)	3.9 (39.0)
Record low °C (°F)	−4.0 (24.8)	−2.0 (28.4)	−2.3 (27.9)	−3.0 (26.6)	−4.0 (24.8)	−3.0 (26.6)	−4.5 (23.9)	−6.0 (21.2)	−2.0 (28.4)	−2.0 (28.4)	−2.4 (27.7)	−2.0 (28.4)	−6.0 (21.2)
Average precipitation mm (inches)	164.1 (6.46)	117.4 (4.62)	97.1 (3.82)	44.5 (1.75)	11.5 (0.45)	11.2 (0.44)	5.5 (0.22)	24.0 (0.94)	28.4 (1.12)	38.2 (1.50)	51.7 (2.04)	96.6 (3.80)	641.2 (25.24)
Average precipitation days	15.9	13.6	11.5	6.4	2.7	2.9	1.6	3.8	4.9	6.7	7.6	12.2	87.1
Average snowy days	0.0	0.0	0.0	0.0	0.0	0.0	0.04	0.08	0.0	0.0	0.0	0.0	0.15
Mean monthly sunshine hours	167.5	154.7	170.0	190.6	238.8	190.2	219.7	266.4	219.1	229.5	236.8	190.8	2,474.1
Mean daily sunshine hours	6.9	6.3	6.9	7.5	8.4	7.0	8.6	9.0	8.5	8.0	9.0	6.8	7.7
Source: Servicio Nacional de Meteorología e Hidrología de Bolivia

== Gallery ==
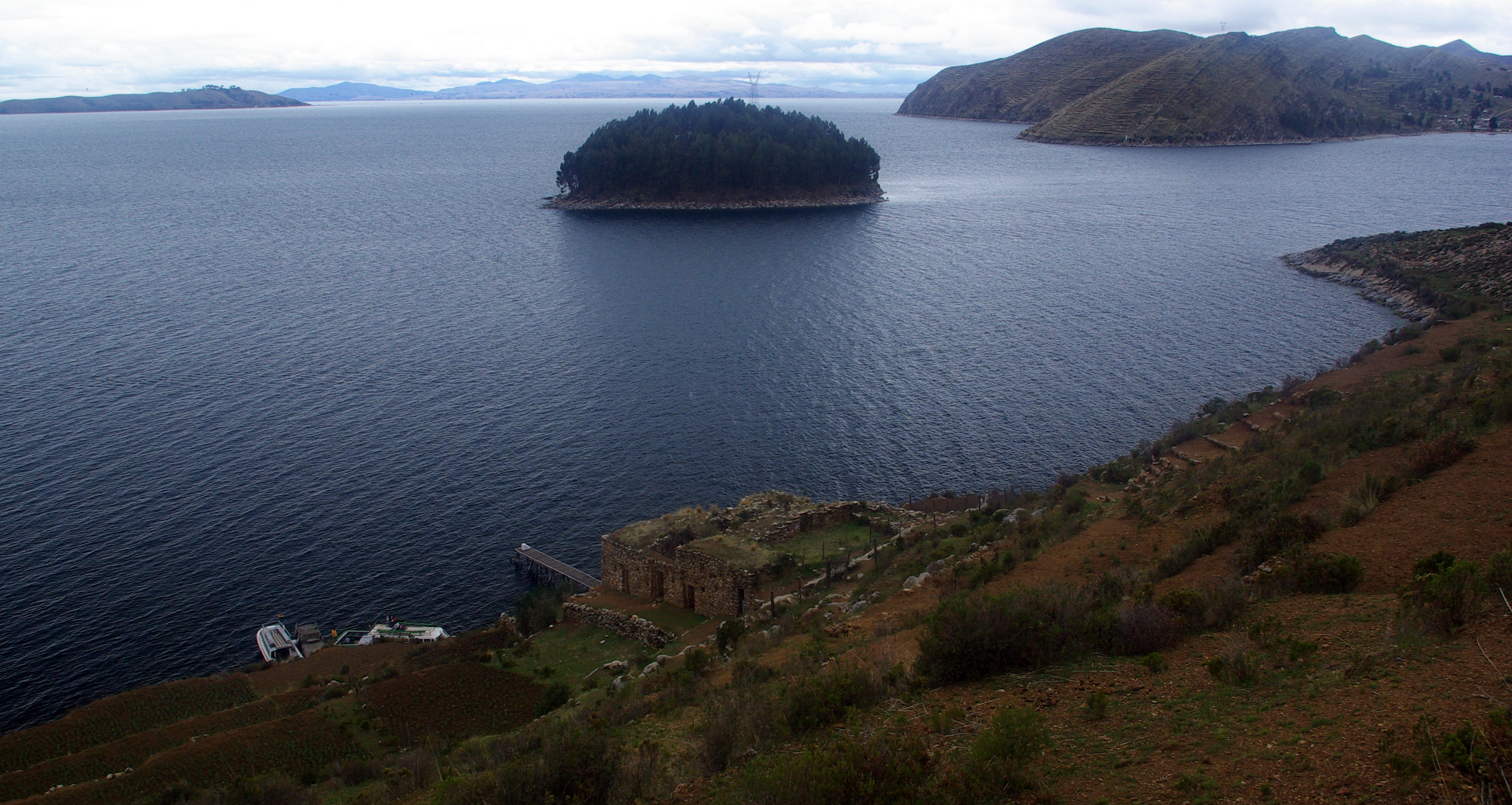
The ruins of Pillkukayna, at the southern end of the island.

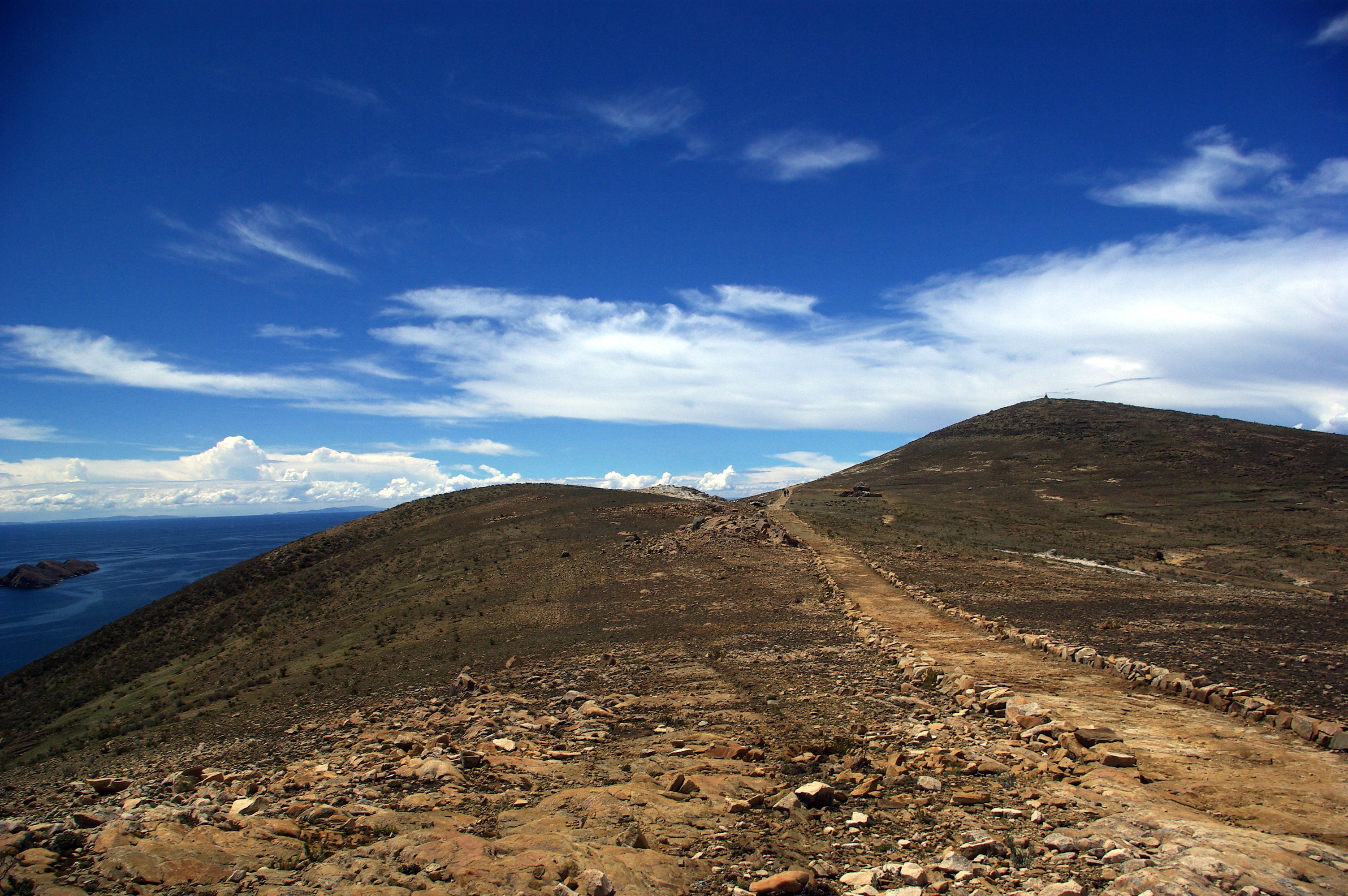
Walking path down the centre of the island.

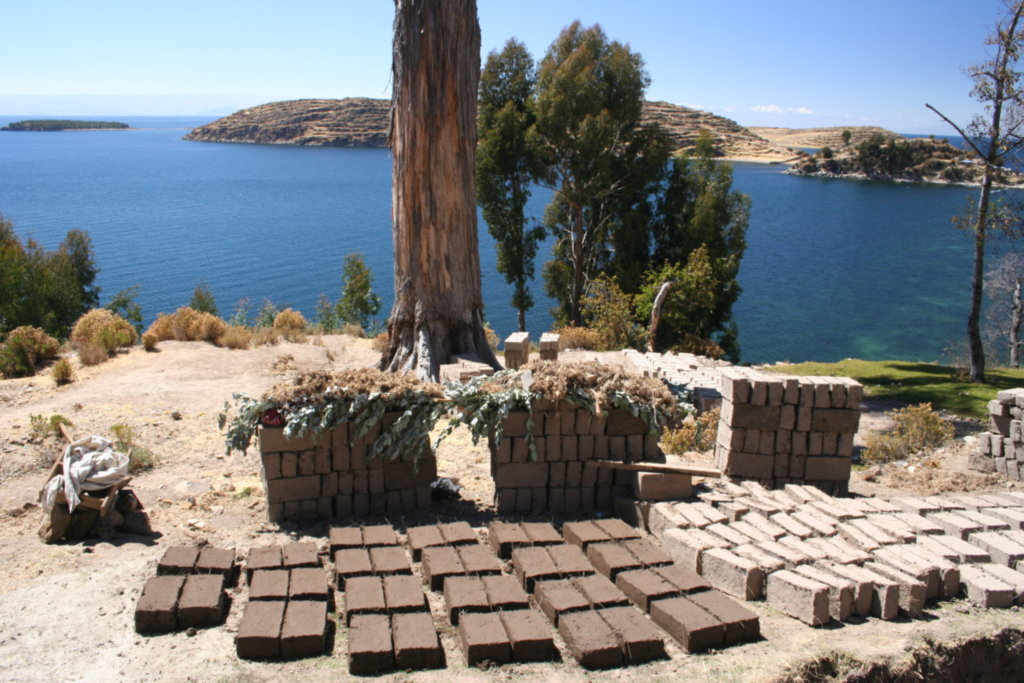
Adobe bricks drying in the sun.
