= National Institute of Statistics =

National Institute of Statistics or National Statistics Institute may refer to:

- National Institute of Statistics of Bolivia
- National Institute of Statistics of Cambodia
- National Institute of Statistics and Census of Costa Rica
- National Institute of Statistics and Census of Nicaragua
- National Institute of Statistics (Guatemala)
- National Institute of Statistics (Italy)
- National Institute of Statistics (Portugal)
- National Institute of Statistics (Romania)
- National Institute of Statistics (Tunisia)
- National Institute of Statistics (Venezuela)
- National Statistics Institute (Chile)
- National Statistics Institute (Spain)
- National Statistics Institute (Uruguay)

== See also ==
- List of national and international statistical services
- National Institute of Statistics and Census (disambiguation)
- Instituto Nacional de Estadística (disambiguation)
- Instituto Nacional de Estadística e Informática, a Peruvian government agency
- Instituto Nacional de Estadística y Geografía, a Mexican government agency
