= Instituto Nacional de Estadística =

Instituto Nacional de Estadística may refer to:

- National Institute of Statistics and Census of Argentina (Instituto Nacional de Estadística y Censos)
- National Institute of Statistics of Bolivia (Instituto Nacional de Estadística de Bolivia)
- National Statistics Institute (Chile)
- Instituto Nacional de Estadística y Censos de Costa Rica
- Instituto Nacional de Estadística y Censos (Ecuador), see List of national and international statistical services § Americas
- National Institute of Statistics (Guatemala) (Instituto Nacional de Estadística)
- Instituto Nacional de Estadística y Censos (Honduras), see List of national and international statistical services § Americas
- Instituto Nacional de Estadística, Geografía e Informática, Mexico
- Instituto Nacional de Estadística y Censo – Panamá, see List of national and international statistical services § Americas
- Instituto Nacional de Estadística (Paraguay), see List of national and international statistical services § Americas
- Instituto Nacional de Estadística e Informática, Peru
- Instituto Nacional de Estatística (Portugal)
- Instituto Nacional de Estadística (Spain)
- National Statistics Institute (Uruguay), see List of national and international statistical services § Americas
- National Institute of Statistics (Venezuela) (Instituto Nacional de Estadística)

== See also ==
- National Institute of Statistics (disambiguation)
- National Institute of Statistics and Census (disambiguation)
- Instituto Nacional de Estatística (disambiguation), in various lusophone countries
- National Institute of Statistics, Geography and Data Processing, a Mexican government agency
- INE (disambiguation)
