= INEC =

INEC may refer to:

- Ilocos Norte Electric Cooperative
- Independent National Electoral Commission, Nigeria
- National Institute of Statistics and Census (disambiguation) (Portuguese and Spanish abbreviation: INEC)
