= Tourism in Bolivia =

Bolivia's tourism logo

Tourism in Bolivia is one of the key economic sectors of the country. According to data from the National Institute of Statistics of Bolivia (INE), there were over 1.24 million tourists that visited the country in 2020, making Bolivia the ninth most visited country in South America.

People have visited Bolivia for centuries in the form of movement of people during the pre-Inca and Inca period, in which wealthy groups within moved outside their habitual residence across the vast expanse of the Inca empire. that stretched 2,500 from Ecuador in the north to Chile in the south.

== History ==
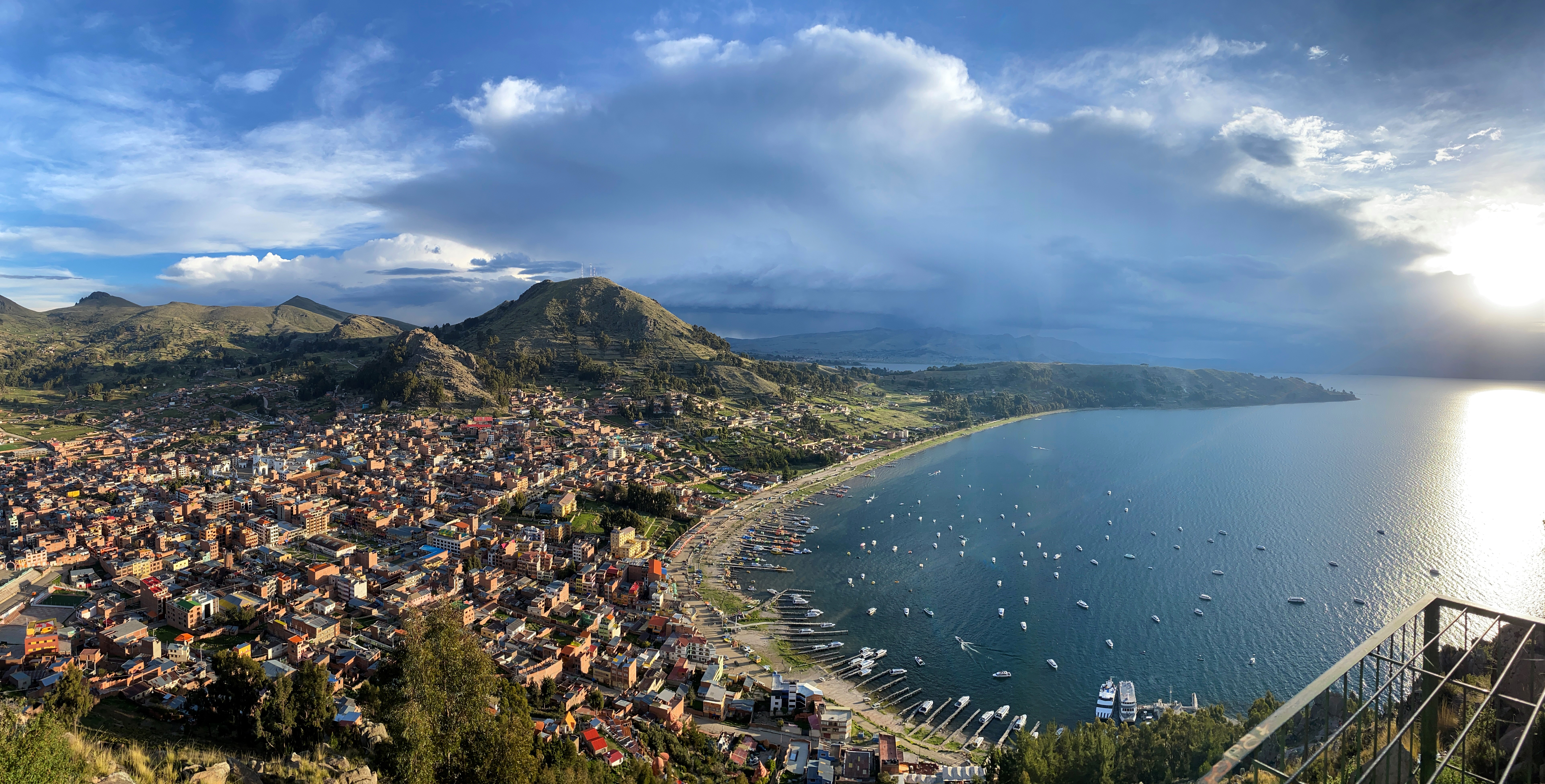
Copacabana, located on the southern shore of Lake Titicaca, was among the earliest tourist destinations since the 1940s.

People have visited Bolivia for centuries. During the pre-Incan and Incan period, privileged social groups could move away from their place of residence and settle in new towns. The Inca road system, a vast network of carefully engineered roads that connected settlements in present-day Ecuador, Peru, Bolivia, Chile and Argentina, facilitated the movement of people and goods across South America. During the colonial era, several expeditions were carried out in Bolivia as a way to seek resources and wealth and expand the Spanish domain.

Tourism in Bolivia was formalized as an official entity in 1930 during the presidency of David Toro. From that moment on, the Bolivian government began to regulate tourism within the country, to ensure the care of tourist attractions and to provide assistance to foreign tourists arriving in Bolivia.

Organized tourism in Bolivia began in the 1940s. One of the precursors of this activity was Darius Morgan, a Romanian entrepreneur who came to Bolivia working for the Swedish company Ericsson. When touring the Altiplano region around Lake Titicaca, Morgan had been fascinated by the scenic beauty of the area, which was not frequently visited at the time. Morgan eventually established the first travel agency in Bolivia and began offering organized tours to Lake Titicaca. Given the lack of accommodation establishments in the lake region, tourists stayed in camps with tents set up and food prepared in advance. However, Morgan managed to spread the word about the natural beauty of the region, impacting the arrival of more foreign tourists who wanted to visit the highest navigable lake in the world. In 1986, Darius Morgan was awarded the Order of the Condor of the Andes, the highest distinction in Bolivia, for his contribution to the development of tourism in the country.

== Arrivals ==
Tourist arrivals of 2024 in %

Yearly tourist arrivals in thousands

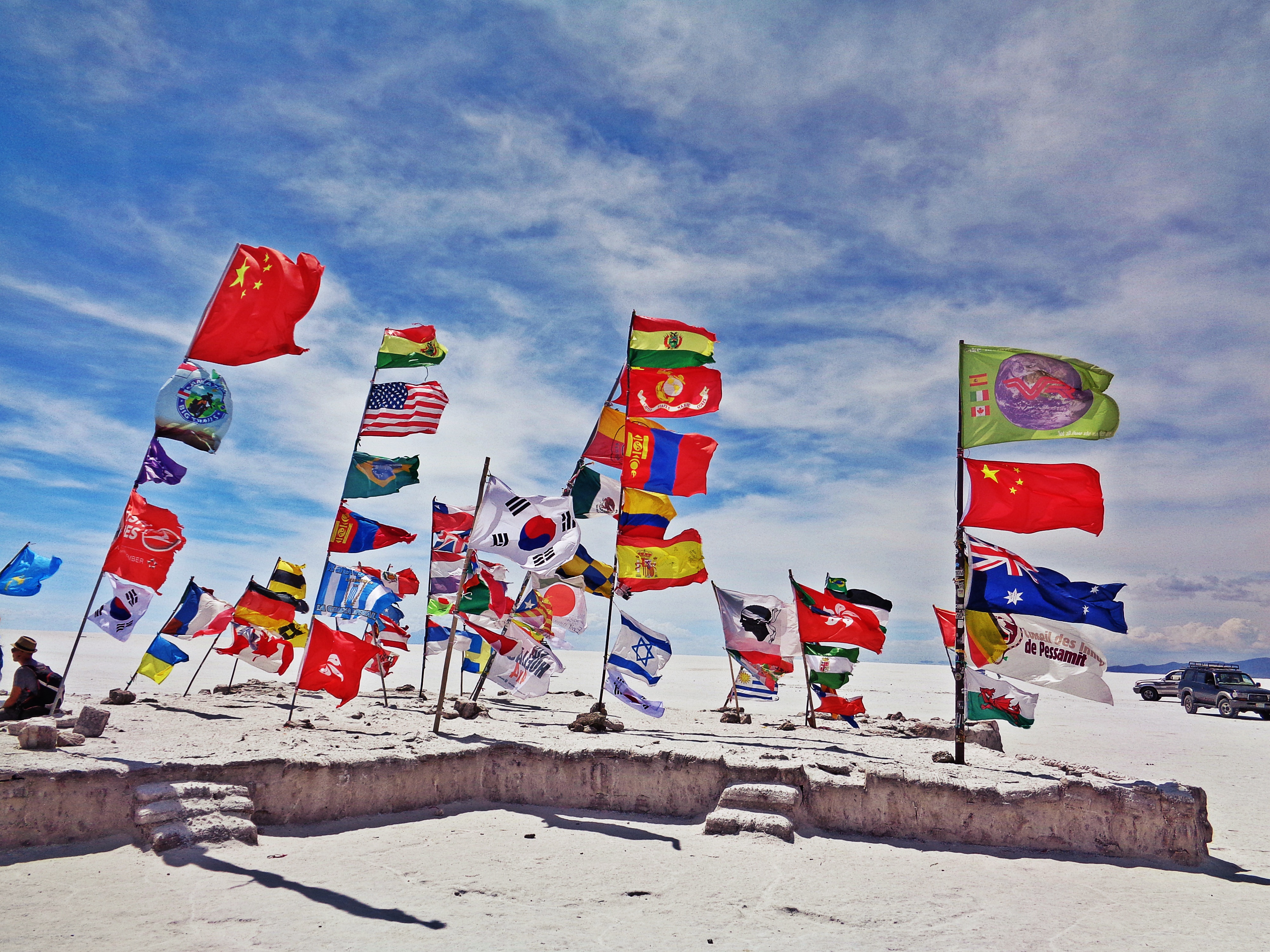
Flags on display at the Salar de Uyuni

Tourism in Bolivia has experienced significant growth, increasing from 319,000 international visitors and $101 million in revenue in 2000 to over 1.1 million arrivals and more than $581 million in revenue by 2012. According to data from the National Institute of Statistics of Bolivia, the country received around two million tourists in 2023, approximately one million were foreign nationals, while the remaining were domestic ones:

| # | Country | Arrivals |
|---|---|---|
| 1 | Argentina | 382 725 |
| 2 | Peru | 203 201 |
| 3 | Brazil | 67 629 |
| 4 | United States | 52 967 |
| 5 | Chile | 48 595 |
| 6 | Spain | 37 458 |
| 7 | Colombia | 24 073 |
| 8 | Paraguay | 20 130 |
| 9 | France | 19 593 |
| 10 | Germany | 18 310 |
| 11 | Ecuador | 10 668 |
| 12 | United Kingdom | 10 620 |
| 13 | Mexico | 10 081 |
| 14 | Italy | 8 701 |
| 15 | China | 8 135 |
| 16 | Canada | 7 973 |
| 17 | South Korea | 7 870 |
| 18 | Venezuela | 6 683 |
| 19 | Switzerland | 5 495 |
| 20 | Netherlands | 4 596 |
| 21 | Uruguay | 4 392 |
| 22 | Panama | 4 283 |
| 23 | Japan | 3 806 |
| 24 | Australia | 3 539 |
| 25 | Israel | 3 106 |
| 26 | Belgium | 2 758 |
| 27 | Poland | 2 430 |
| 28 | Sweden | 2 259 |
| 29 | Ireland | 1 830 |
| 30 | Portugal | 1 655 |
| 31 | Austria | 1 637 |
| 32 | Costa Rica | 1 635 |
| 33 | Russia | 1 616 |
| 34 | Cuba | 1 568 |
| 35 | Denmark | 1 221 |
| 36 | Czech Republic | 975 |
| 37 | India | 937 |
| 38 | New Zealand | 842 |
| 39 | Norway | 837 |
| 40 | Turkey | 745 |
| 41 | Guatemala | 669 |
| 42 | El Salvador | 554 |
| 43 | Taiwan | 544 |
| 44 | Dominican Republic | 543 |
| 45 | Romania | 482 |
| 46 | Honduras | 455 |
| 47 | Finland | 428 |
| 48 | Nicaragua | 262 |
| 49 | South Africa | 198 |
| 50 | Other countries | 6 868 |
| | Total | 1.009.267 |

== Land and climate ==
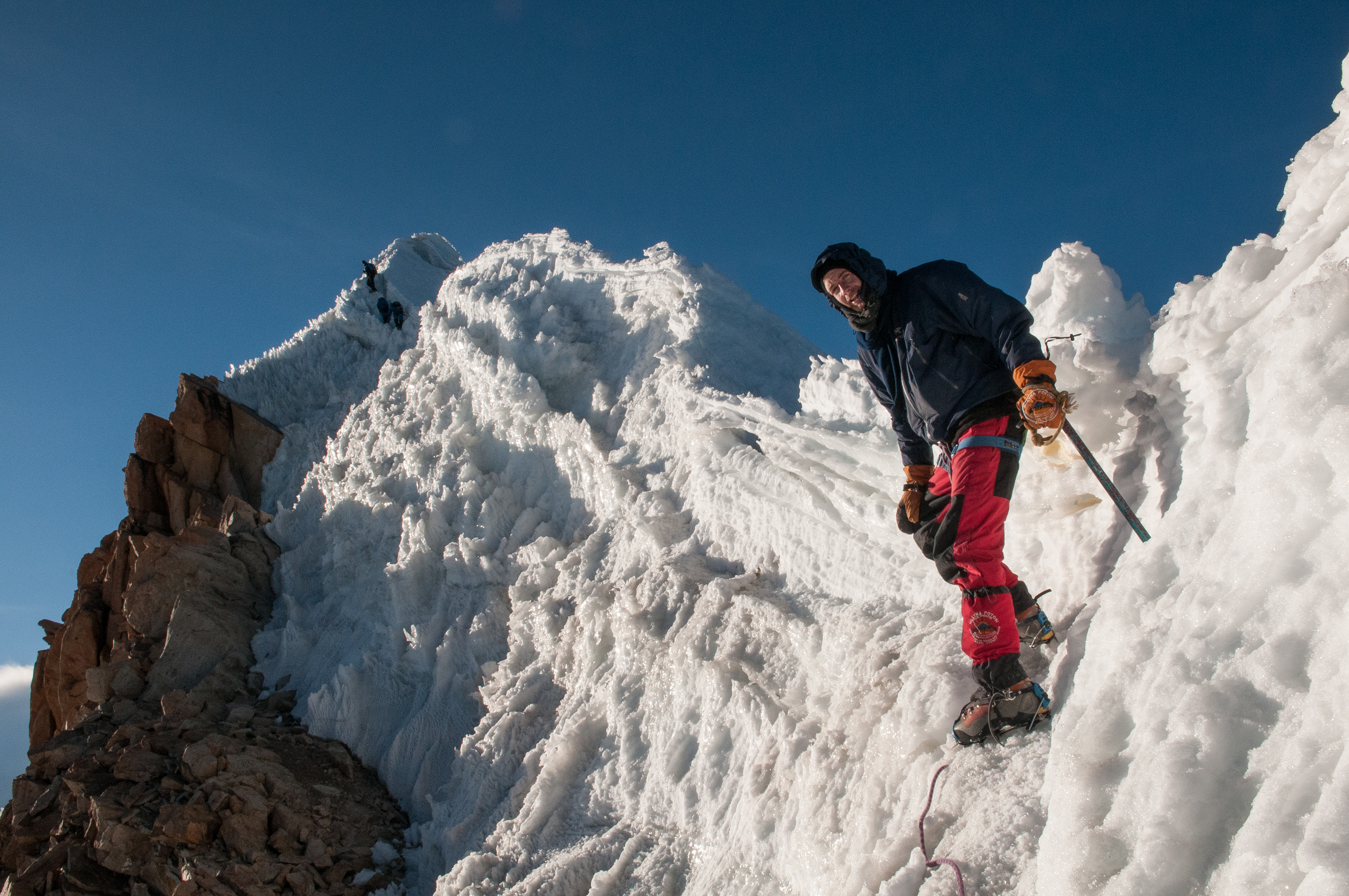
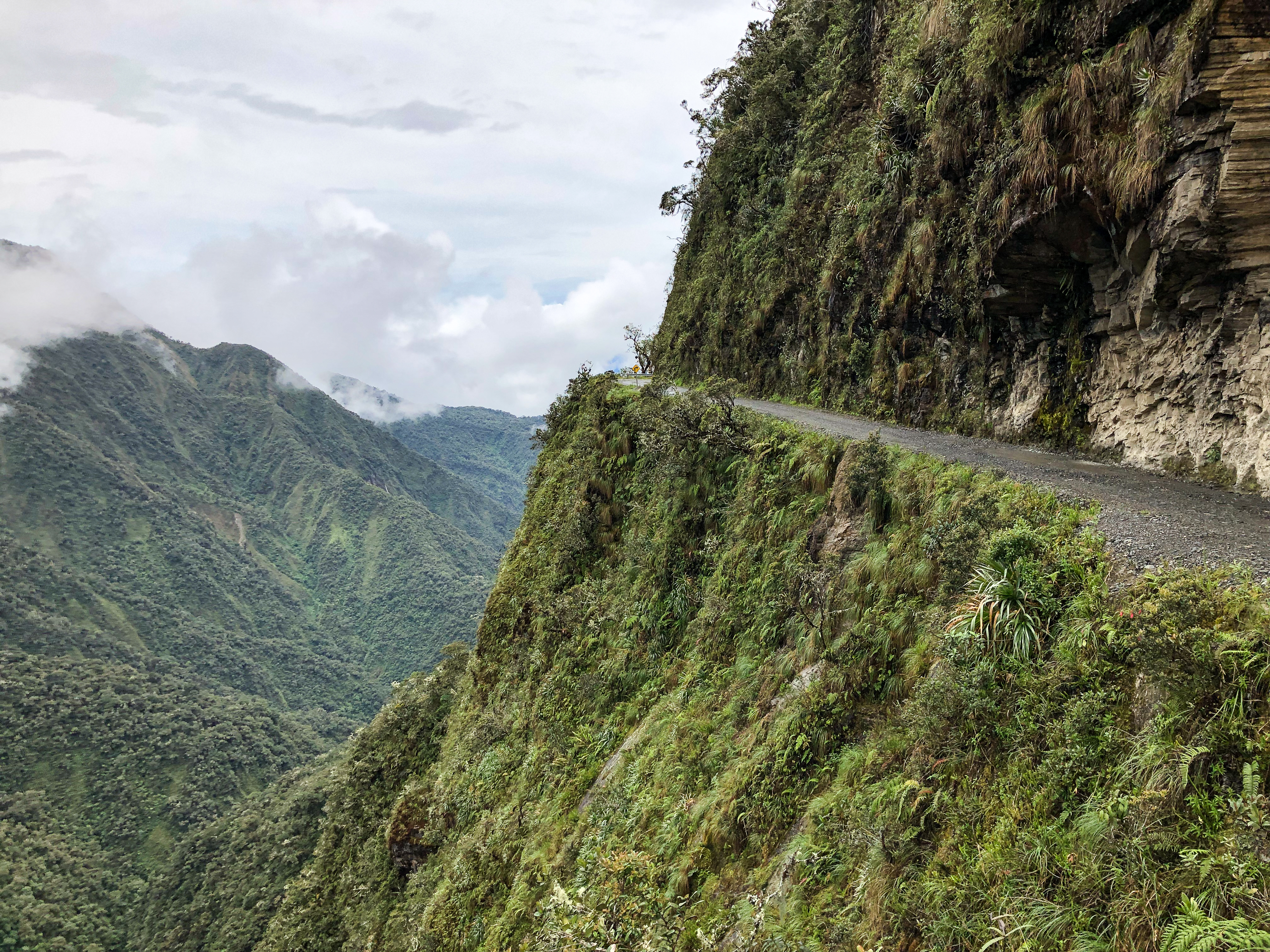
A climber ascending Huayna Potosí (left) and the Yungas Road, commonly known as the "death road" (right).

Bolivia is located in the center of South America, in what could be considered its western strip and is one of the two landlocked countries in the continent. The western region of the country is dominated by the Andes mountains, more precisely in the Cordillera Real, bisecting the country roughly from north to south and the Altiplano, a high plateau where Lake Titicaca is located. This region includes steep slopes and many snow-capped peaks. To the east of the mountain range are lowland plains and tropical rainforests from the Amazon Basin. These geographical characteristics have influenced the culture of Bolivia and contribute with unique cultural and natural sites that are unique to the country.

Due to its diverse geography, Bolivia has several geographical areas and climates, and the three predominant ones are Andean (28% of the territory), sub-Andean (13%), and plains (59%). The climate of Bolivia varies drastically from one ecoregion to the other, from the tropics in the eastern llanos to polar climates in the western Andes. This has brought about ecotourism to Bolivia and has also made it a popular tourist destination for outdoor activities, such as mountain climbing. The summers are warm, humid in the east and dry in the west, with rains that often modify temperatures, humidity, winds, atmospheric pressure and evaporation, giving place to very different climates. When the climatological phenomenon known as El Niño takes place, it provokes great alterations in the weather. Winters are very cold in the west, and it snows around the mountain ranges, while in the western regions, windy days are more usual. The autumn is dry in the non-tropical regions.

== Major attractions ==
=== World Heritage Sites ===
World Heritage Sites in Bolivia: cultural sites marked in red, natural sites marked in green.

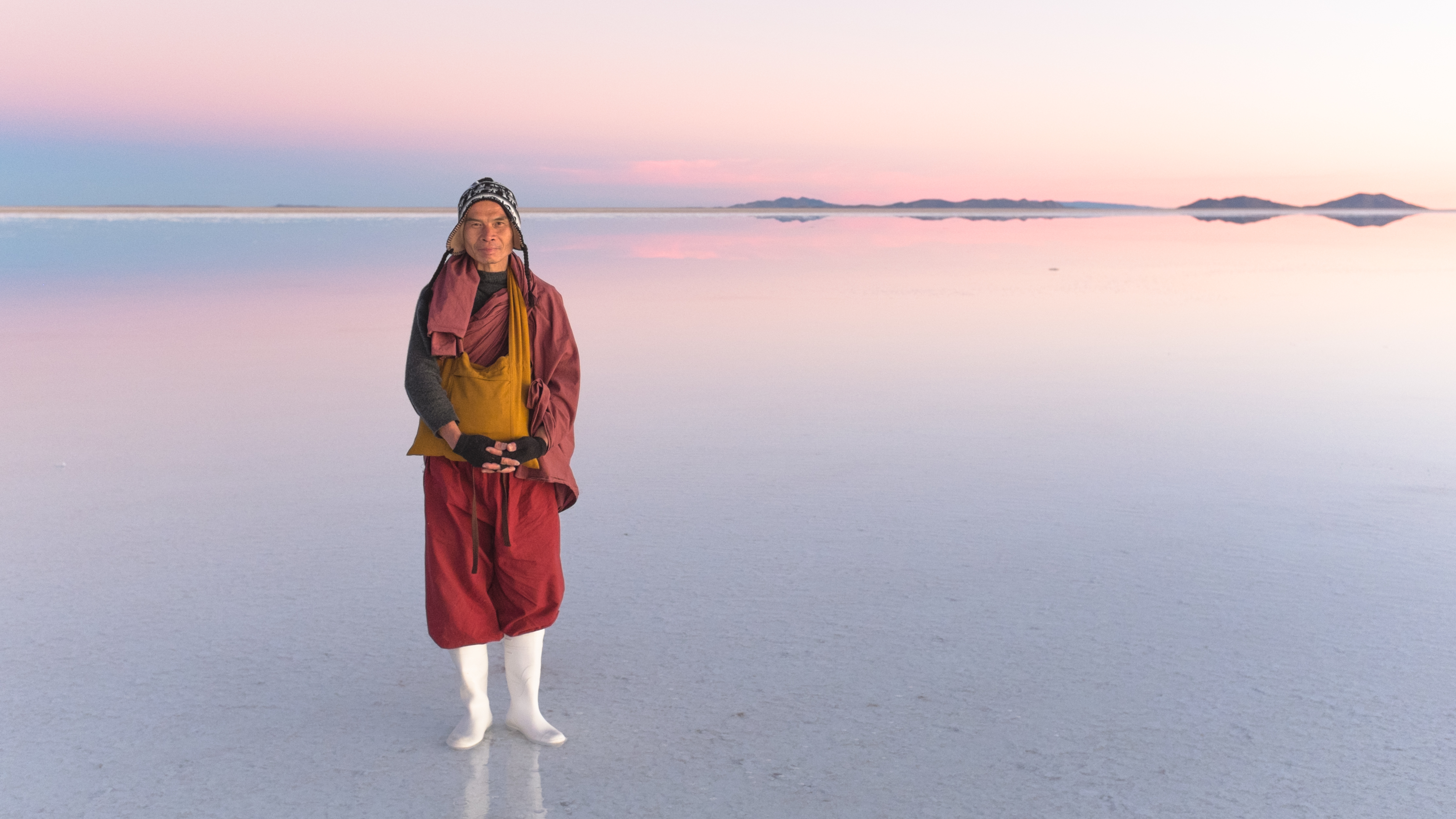
The Salar de Uyuni is the world's largest salt desert and is famous for its mirror-like views during the rainy season.

Bolivia has seven World Heritage Sites listed by UNESCO. They constitute important tourist attractions due to their historical and cultural legacy. Bolivia was among the first countries that ratified folklore as a cultural heritage at the UNESCO Convention of 1972, giving rise to profound debates, resulting in the creation of the "Text of the Convention for the Safeguarding of the Intangible Cultural Heritage" in 2003.

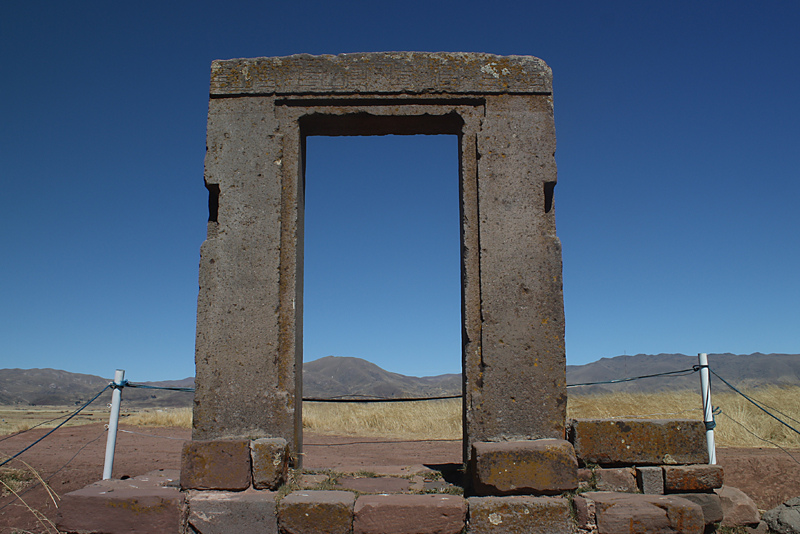
The Gate of the Moon in Tiwanaku

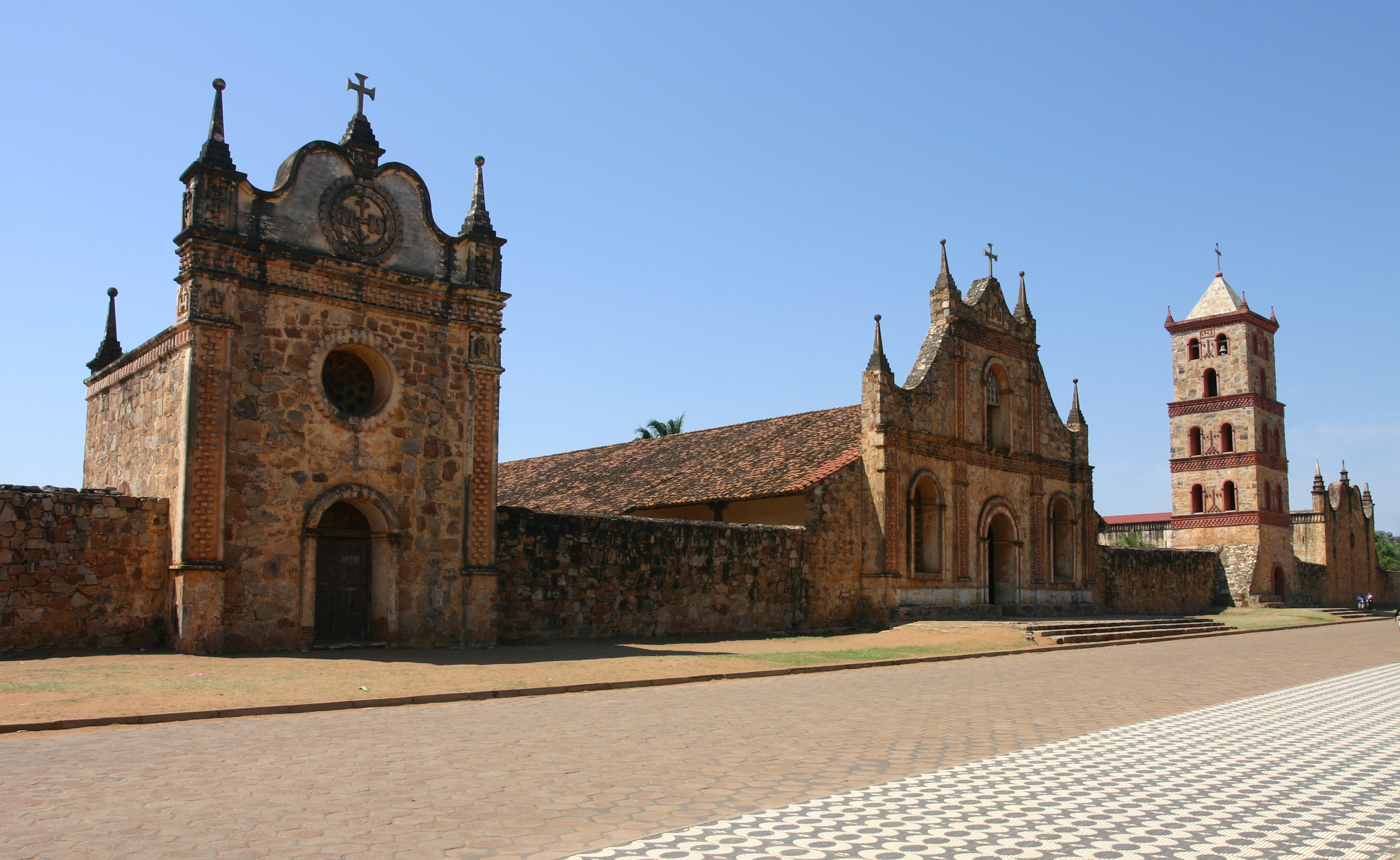
Mission San José in the Jesuit Missions of Chiquitos

- The city of Potosí (1987): Known as Villa Imperial de Potosí (Spanish for Imperial City of Potosí), was the first site to be recognized by UNESCO in Bolivia, due to its contribution to universal history, often considered one of the birthplaces of early capitalism. It was one of the world's most important mining sites during the colonial times, and a source of wealth for the Spanish Empire. The city is also considered the cradle of the Andean baroque architectural style. During the 16th century, It was considered the world's largest industrial complex and its population grew to more than 200,000 inhabitants. The Cerro Rico, discovered by the Spanish in 1545, contained what was once the largest silver mine in the world, contributing with 60% of the world's silver exploitation at the time. The city is known for its colonial-style neighborhoods and features important cultural sites such as the historic National Mint of Bolivia and the Church of San Lorenzo de Carangas.
- Fort Samaipata (1998): Located in the department of Santa Cruz, it is a pre-Inca archaeological site of Chané origin, located a few kilometers from the town of Samaipata. The fort consists of two parts, the hill with its numerous engravings, believed to be a ceremonial center, and the area south of the hill, which housed the administrative and residential center of the Chané civilization. The great rock is considered the largest carved stone in the world. It served as an astronomical and cosmic observatory for the Chané people, and hosted religious and ceremonial functions towards the moon.
- The Historical City of Sucre (1991): Founded by the Spanish in the first half of the 16th century, Sucre is the constitutional capital of Bolivia. The city features well preserved buildings that show an architectural mixture of Spanish baroque with the assimilation of local traditions and styles. in Latin America through the assimilation of local traditions and styles imported from Europe. Established in 1538 as Villa de la Plata of the new Toledo, the city was the cultural, judicial and religious center of the Region of the Royal Audience of Charcas for several years. In 1839, the city was renamed after Antonio José de Sucre, a Bolivian revolutionary. The University of San Francisco Xavier, founded in 1624, is the oldest university in Bolivia and the second oldest in Latin America.
- The Jesuit missions of Chiquitos (1990): Between 1691 and 1760, the Society of Jesus founded a series of "villages of Indians" in order to Christianize the indigenous population. Largely inspired by the "ideal cities" imagined by the humanist philosophers of the sixteenth century in the territory of Chiquitos, in eastern Bolivia, the Jesuits and their indigenous positions combined European architecture with local traditions. The six historical missions that remain intact are San Xavier, San Rafael de Velasco, San José de Chiquitos, Concepción, San Miguel de Velasco and Santa Ana de Velasco. These today make up a living but vulnerable heritage in the territory of the Chiquitanía and are the only active missions in all of South America.
- The ruins of the city of Tiwanaku (2000): Located near the southern shore of Lake Titicaca in the Bolivian Altiplano, it is considered one of the earliest settlements of human civilization, and one of the oldest in the Americas, it existed for 27 centuries. The city was the spiritual and political center of the Tiwanaku culture and began small settlement and later became a planned city between 400 d. C. and 900 d. C. The main buildings in Tiwanaku include the pyramid of Akapana, a huge staggered adobe pyramid and the temple of Kalasasaya, a sacred site with a structure based on sandstone columns and cut sillars, and featuring standing gargoyles with drainage systems for rainwater. Important monuments include the Gate of the Sun, the Gate of the Moon, and the famous monoliths that feature numerous iconographies and mysterious inscriptions with astronomical meanings.
- Noel Kempff Mercado National Park (2000): Covering an area of 1.5 million hectares, it is one of the largest and most intact natural reserves in the Amazon basin. It is Bolivia's only natural heritage site. The park has various habitats that include mountainous forests and savannas. The flora is rich in diversity of endemic vegetation. It contains about 2,700 species of plants recorded, though it is estimated that there could be about 4,000 species of undiscovered plants. Additionally, the park contains approximately 1,142 species of vertebrates, representing 21% of all species in South America.
- The Inca Road System (2014): Was the most extensive and advanced transportation system in pre-Columbian South America. The network was composed of formal roads carefully planned, engineered, built, marked and maintained; paved where necessary, with stairways to gain elevation, bridges and accessory constructions such as retaining walls, and water drainage systems. At its maximum extension, it connected regions and urban centers in current Ecuador, Peru, Bolivia, Chile and Argentina with a network that exceeded 30,000 kilometers in length. The road system allowed for the transfer of information, goods, soldiers and persons, without the use of wheels, within the Tawantinsuyu or Inca Empire throughout a territory covering almost 2,000,000 km^{2} (770,000 sq mi) and inhabited by about 12 million people.
Image gallery of the World Heritage sites of Bolivia

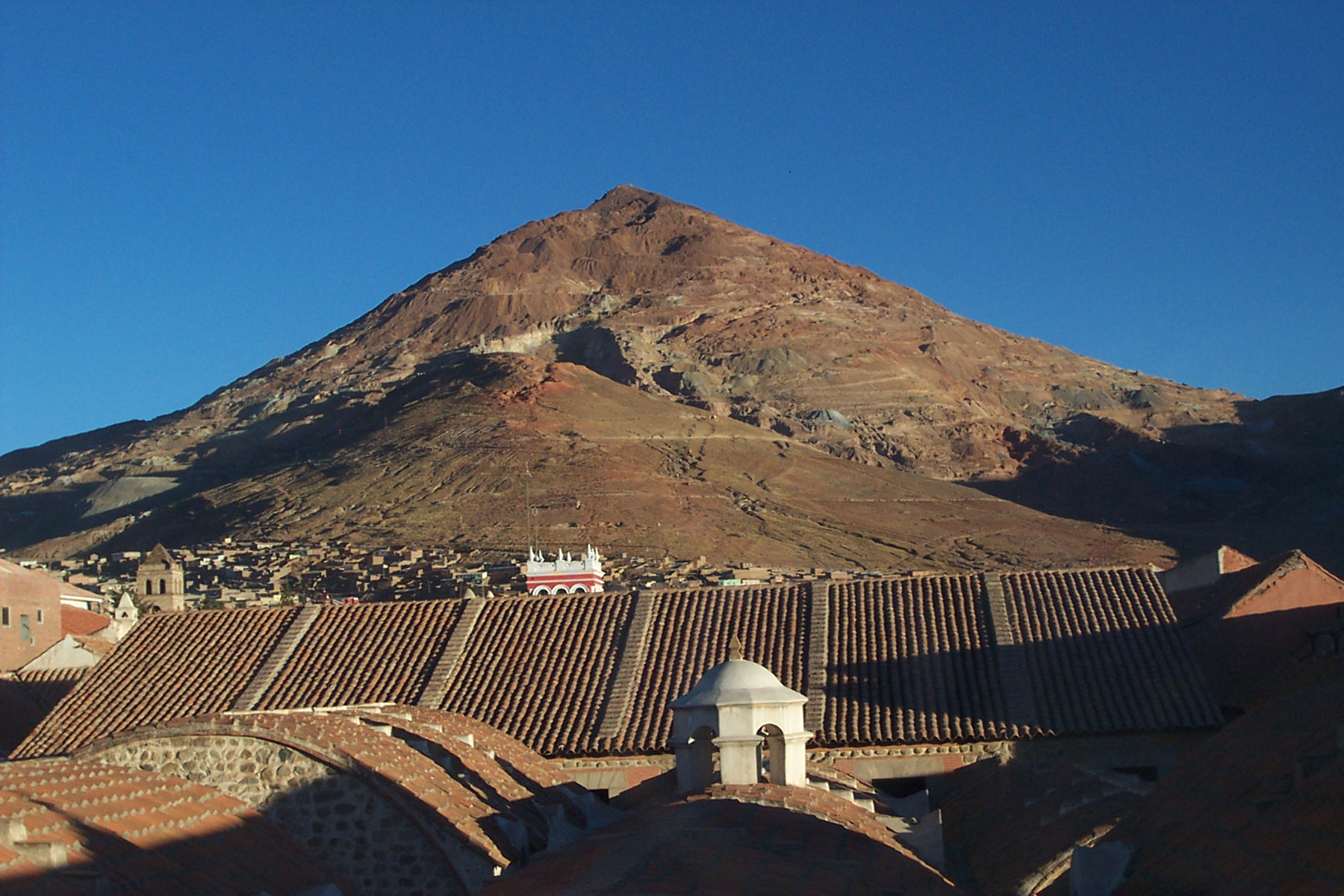
Potosí with the Cerro Rico in the background

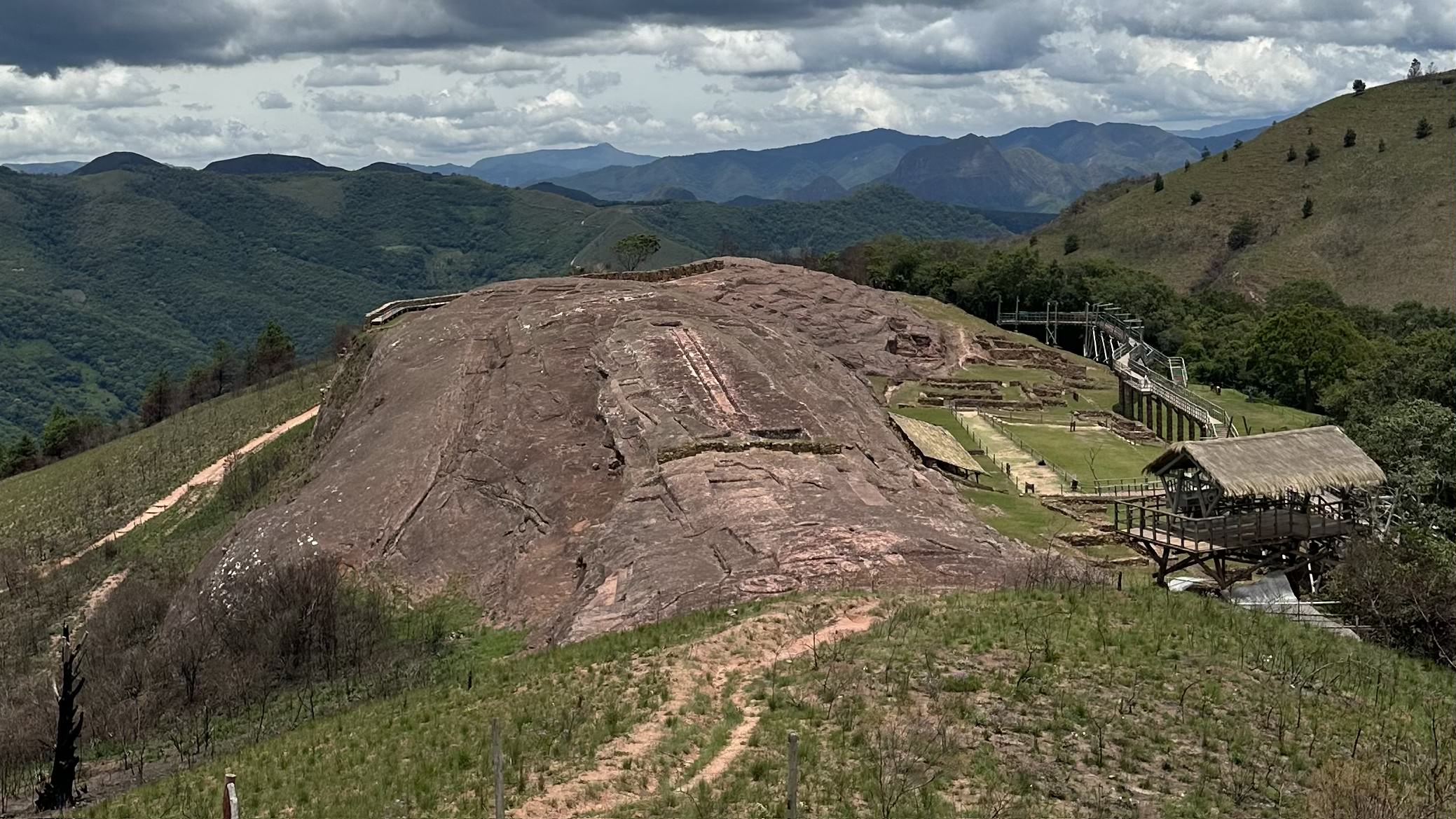
Fort Samaipata contains the world's largest carved rock.

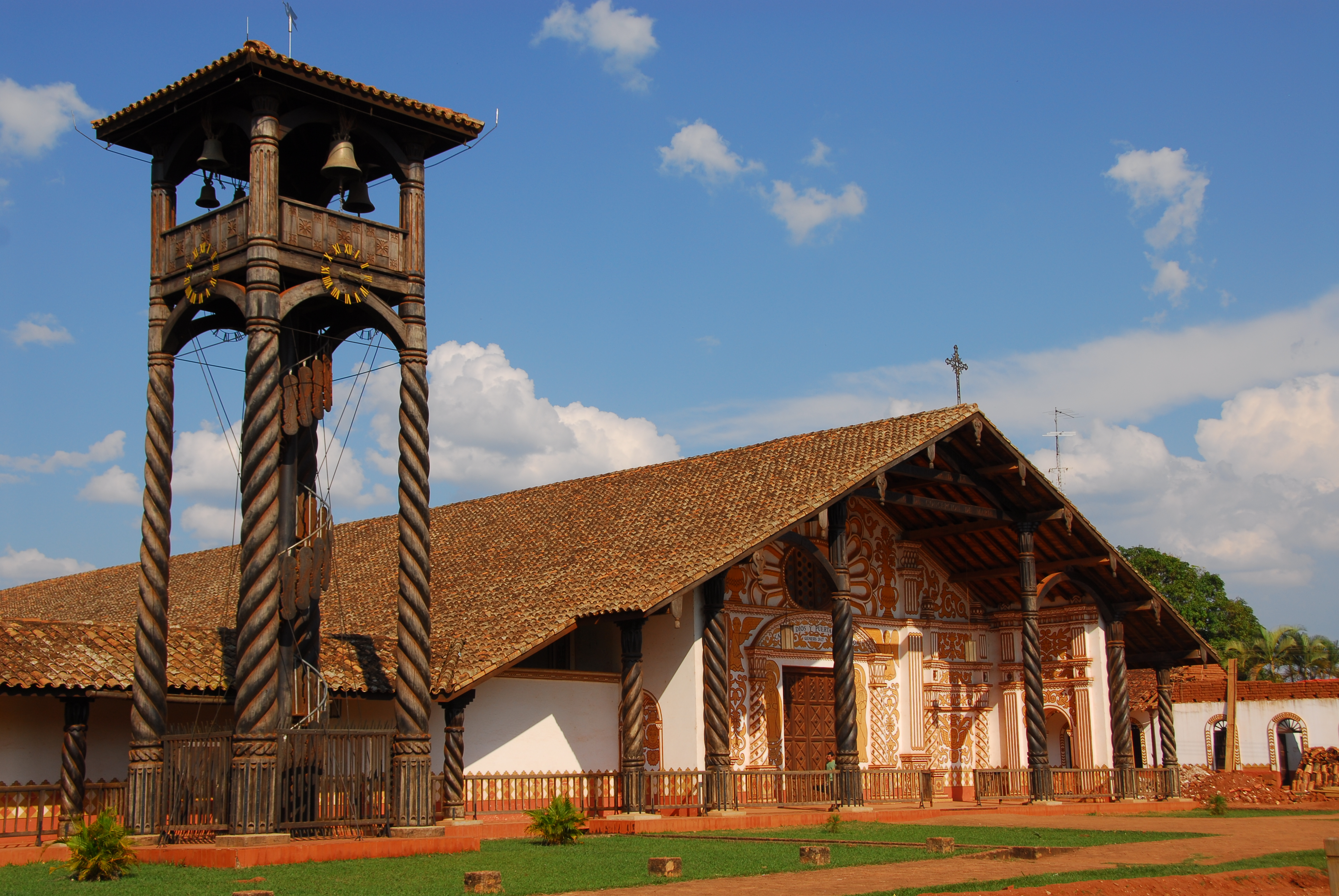
Church of the Jesuit Missions of Chiquitos in Concepción, Santa Cruz

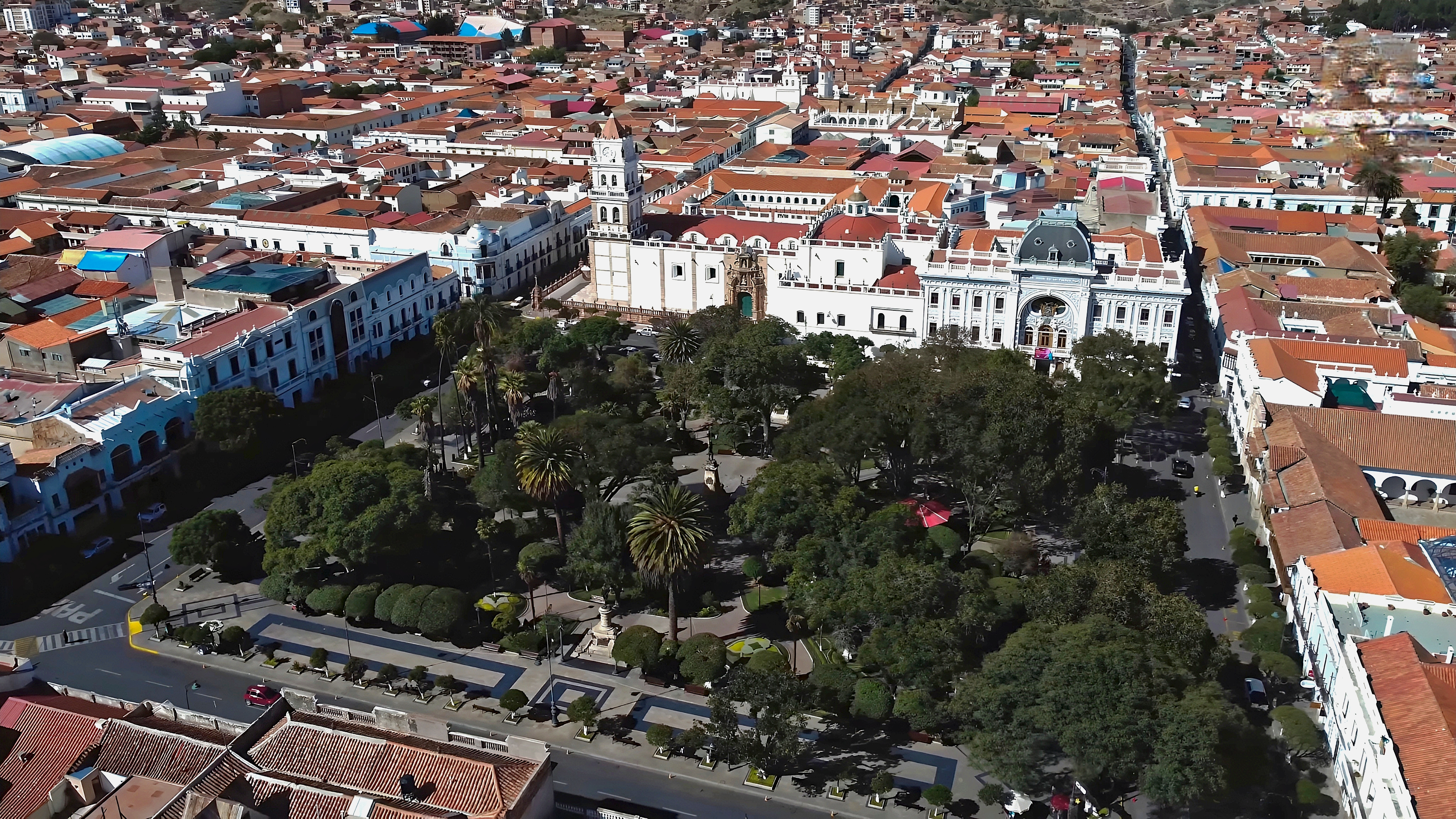
The historic city center of Sucre, Bolivia's constitutional capital

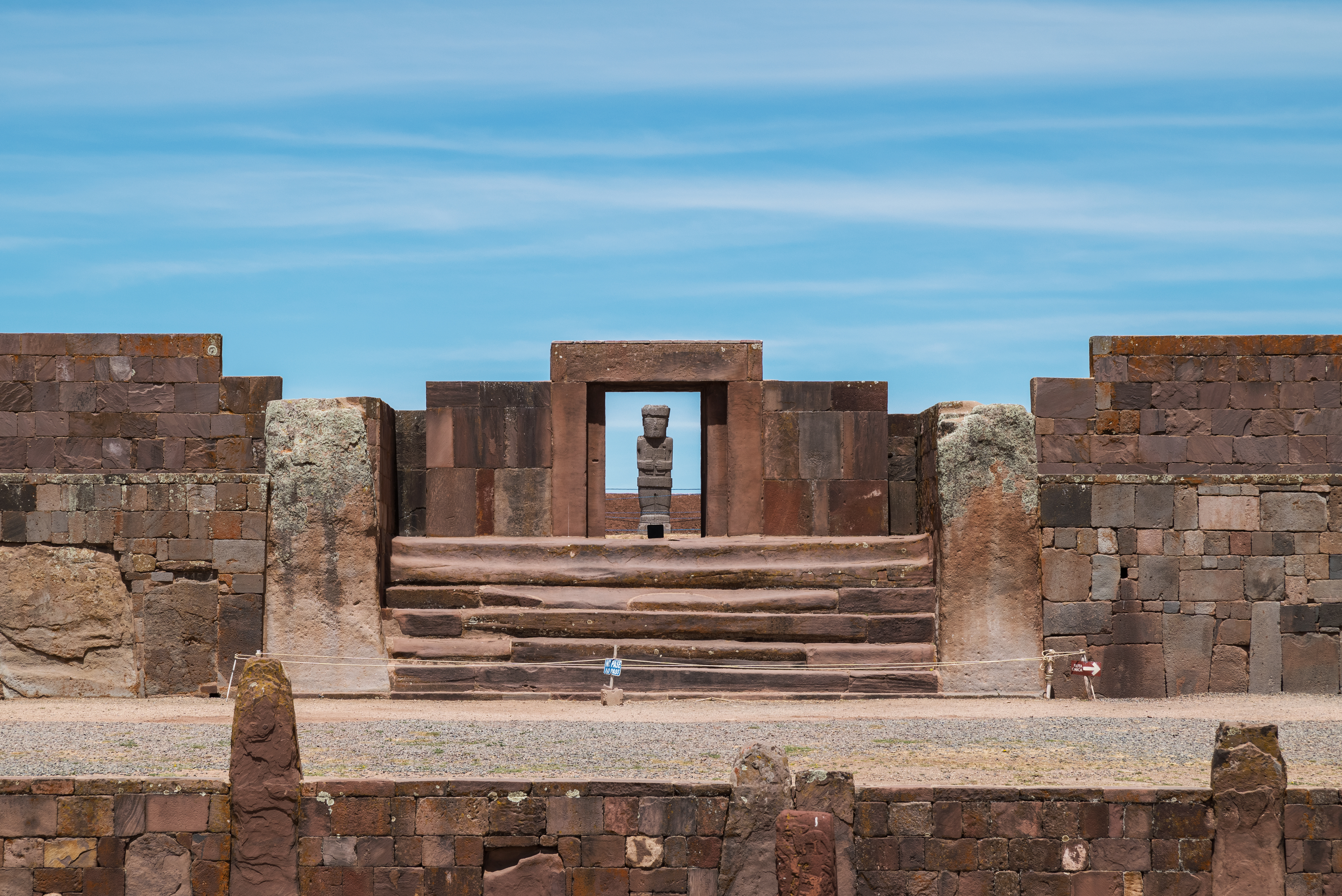
The Kalasasaya site in the ruins of Tiwanaku

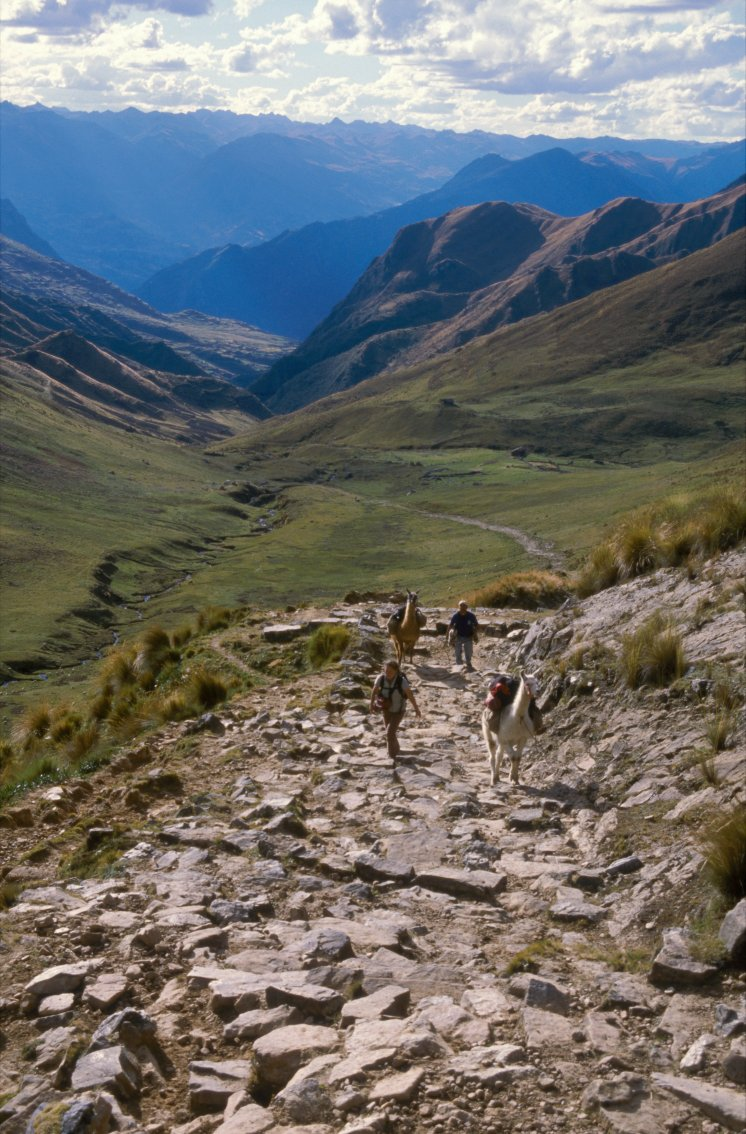
The Inca road system

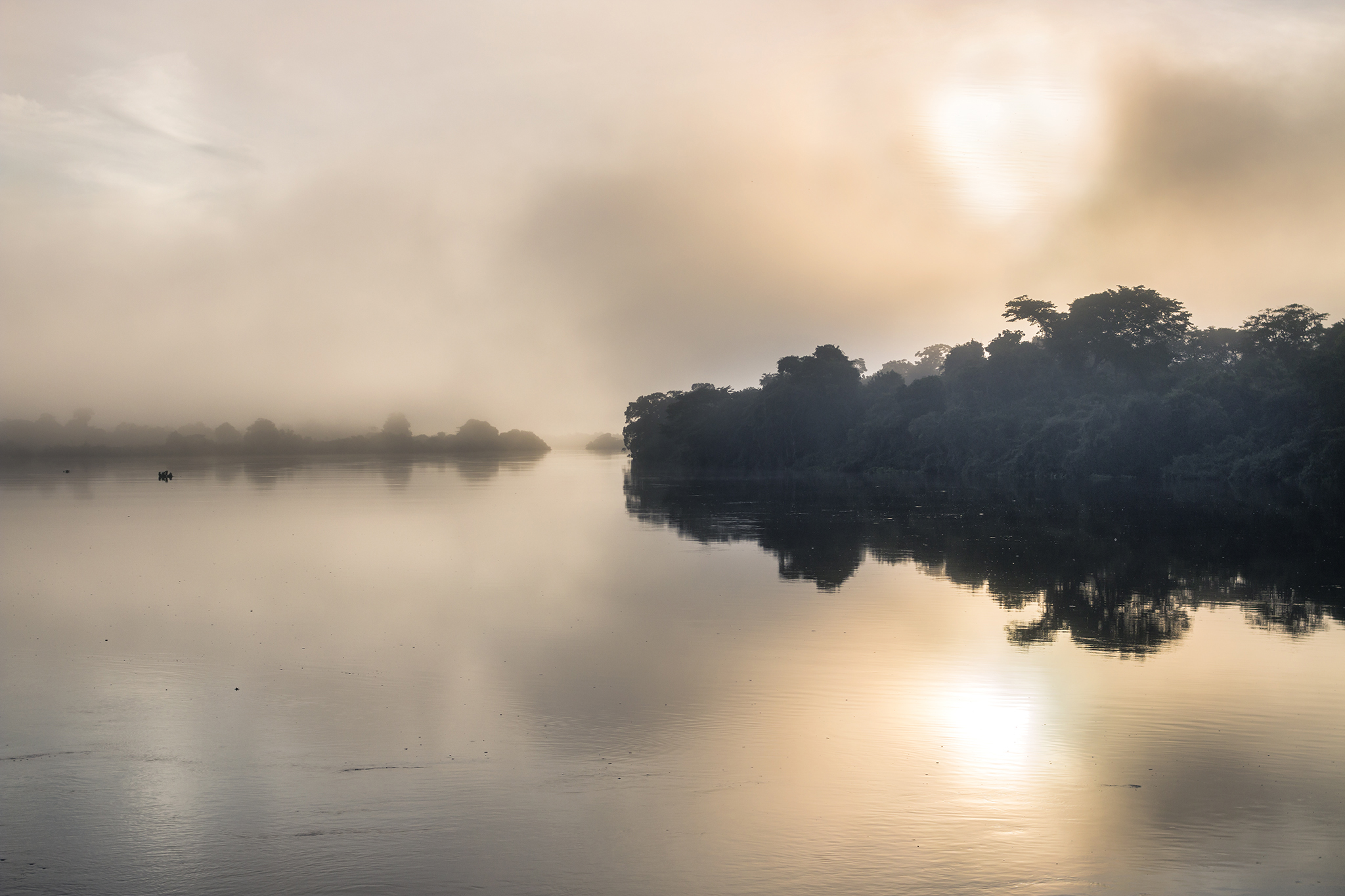
Iténez river, located within the Noel Kempff Mercado National Park

=== Cultural tourism ===
Cultural tourism forms an important sector of the tourism industry in Bolivia. Pre-Columbian civilizations, notably the Inca Empire, Tiwanaku Empire, Wankarani, and the Aymara kingdoms, left a large archeological and cultural heritage.

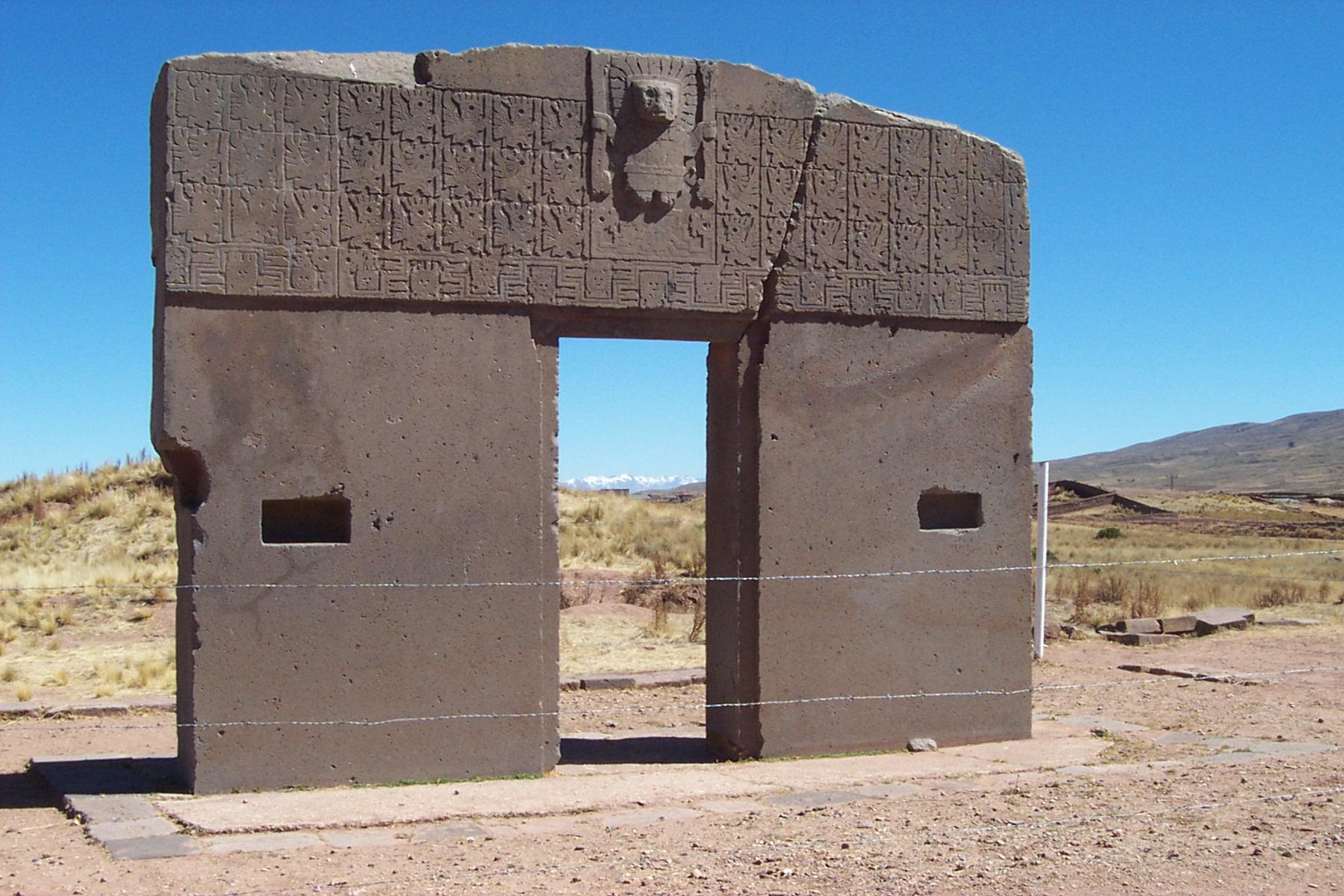
The Gate of the Sun in Tiwanaku

- Tiwanaku: The most important archeological site in the country, it is believed to be founded around the year 1580 BC, is probably one of the most important cultural sites in the country. It was a citadel of the civilization of the same name and is situated near the southern shore of Lake Titicaca in western Bolivia. The main buildings of Tiwanaku include the Akapana Pyramid, a large stepped pyramid covered with cut andesite and the Temple of Kalasasaya, a rectangular enclosure built with alternating stone columns and smaller rectangular blocks that was held ceremonial functions and featured small rooms around. A striking monument in Tiwanaku is the monolithic Gate of the Sun, which is decorated with a carved central figure representing the Incan god Inti, and additional figures, often referred to as angels or winged messengers. Like the Gate of the Sun, the Gate of the Moon is carved from a single block of stone. This impressive monolith is said to align with the rising moon on important ceremonial occasions.

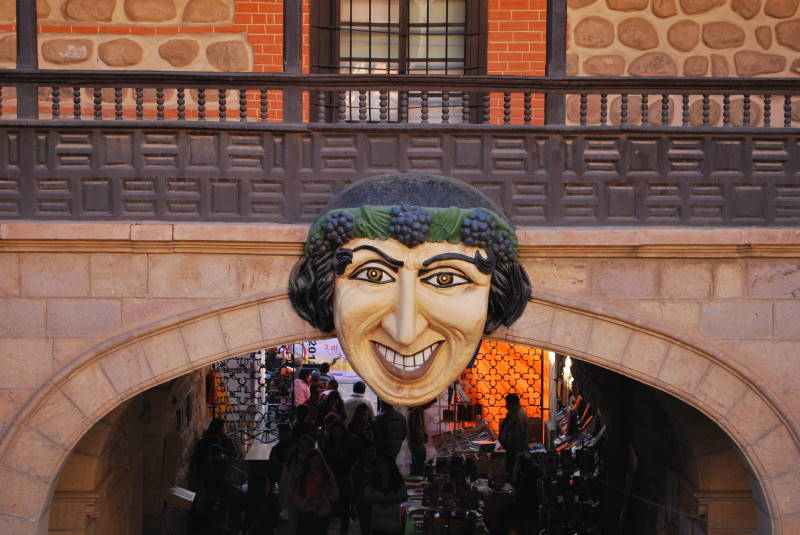
The mascarón at the courtyard of the National Mint of Bolivia

- Potosí: One of the highest cities in the world at an elevation of 13,290 feet or 4050.792 meters above sea level. The name "Potosí" is said to derive from the Quechua word potojchi or potocsi, meaning “deafening noise” or “crash.” It into existence after the discovery of silver there in 1545 and quickly became famous for its wealth. Within three decades its population surpassed 150,000, making it the largest city in the New World. The population declined from a peak of 160,000 about 1650 as silver production waned, and a typhus epidemic in 1719 claimed the lives of some 22,000 residents. By the early 19th century, Potosí had fewer than 20,000 inhabitants, but the subsequent rise of tin mining again spurred growth. The National Mint of Bolivia is an important cultural site one of South America's finest museums. The building was erected in 1753 to regulate the minting of Spanish colonial coins. The central courtyard is dominated by a mask hung in there in 2835 and said to represent Bacchus, the god of wine-making and fertility.

=== Ecotourism ===
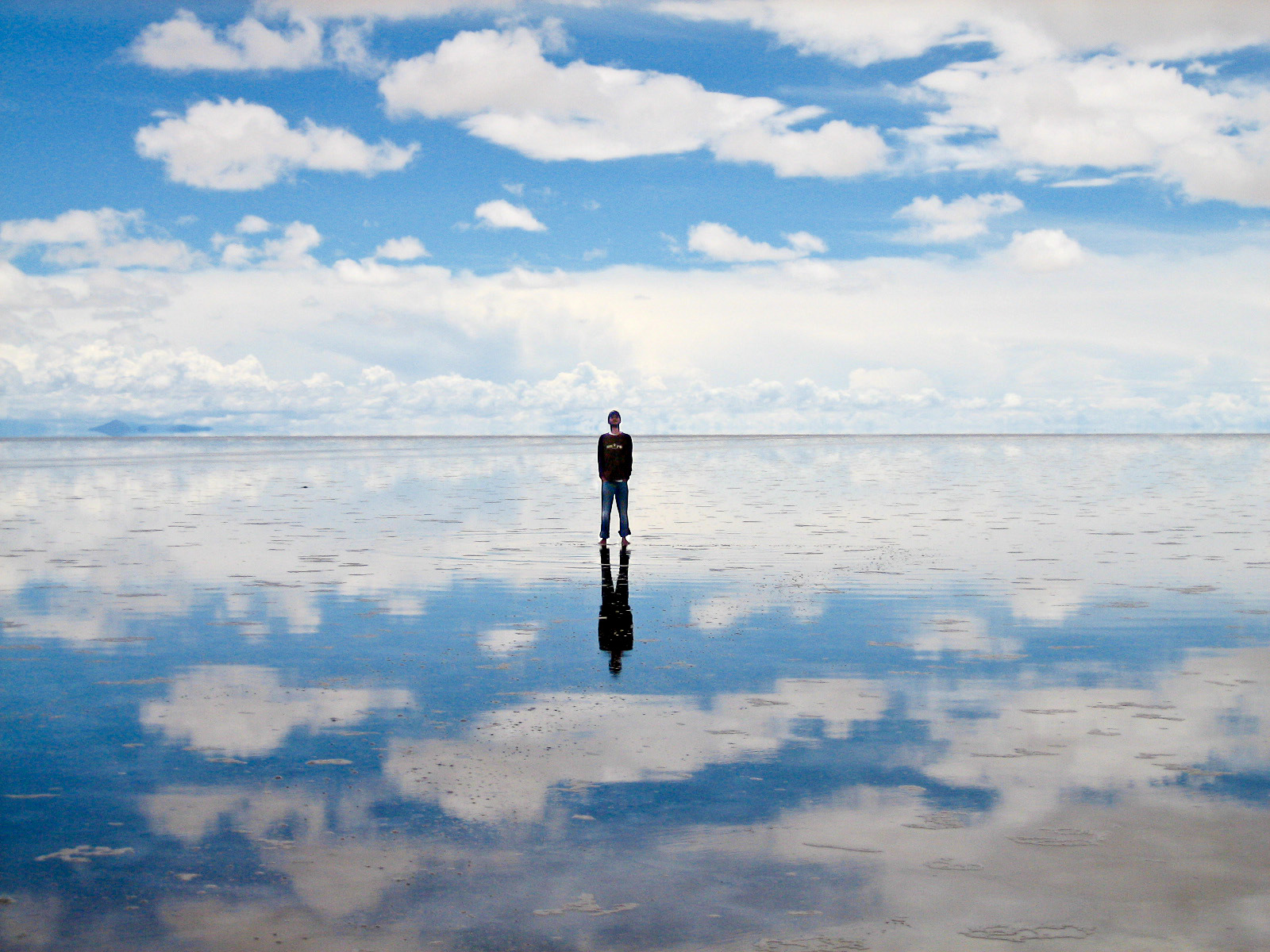
During the rainy season (December to April), the Salar de Uyuni transforms into a shallow lake, becoming the world's largest natural mirror.

The landscape of Bolivia is beautiful and diverse lending itself to tourism, and also ecotourism. Although being a landlocked country, Bolivia is among the 15 most biodiverse countries in the world. This ecological diversity attracts tourists interested in nature and ecology. The increase in ecotourism in recent years has prompted the Bolivian Government to invest more on tourist infrastructure. Bolivia is a country with very different regions. Around 43% of the national territory is covered by the Amazon Basin, mainly in the eastern and northeastern regions of the country. This region includes vast tropical rainforests, some of which remain pristine and untouched. On the other hand, 28% of the territory consists of the Andean region and the Altiplano, featuring a cold, dry climate and high elevations. Places of interest in the Andean region include Lake Titicaca, the Salar de Uyuni, and the cities of La Paz and Potosí.

- Salar de Uyuni: The world's largest salt flat at 10,582 square kilometers or 4086 square miles. It owns its existence to several large and ancient lakes that covered the plateau several thousands years ago. The Salar de Uyuni is of vital importance to its region. During the dry season, the salar is and attracts tourists with its reflective mirror-like surface during the rainy season. It is the most visited tourist place in Bolivia. According to the United States Geological Survey, there are around 21 million tons of untapped lithium reserves in the salar; making it the largest lithium deposit in the world.

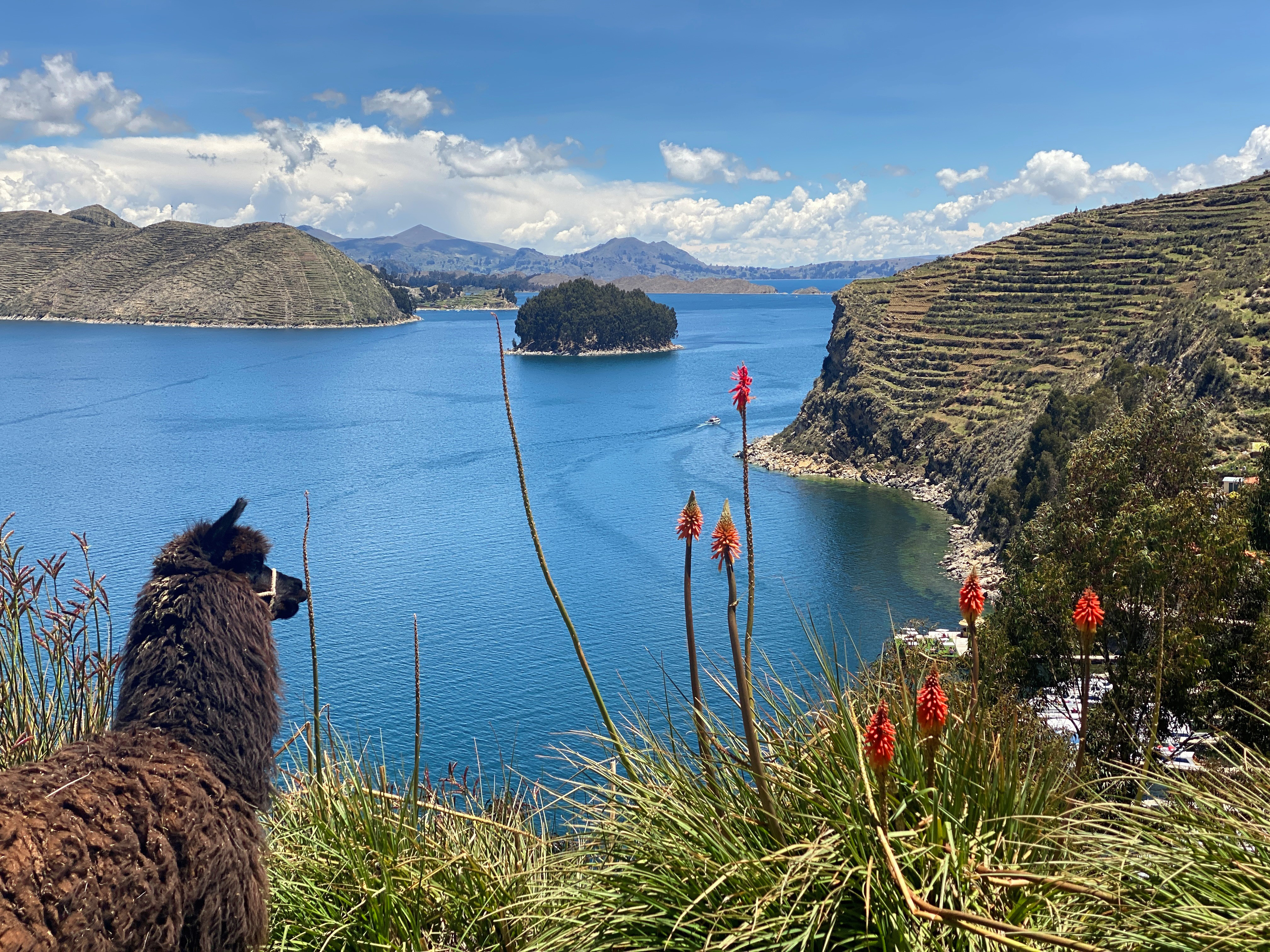
Lake Titicaca, shared between Bolivia and Peru

- Lake Titicaca: The world's highest navigable lake in the world and the largest freshwater lake in South America, it is shared with the neighboring country of Peru. Some places of interest include the Isla del Sol whose name is Spanish for "Island of the Sun". It is named after the Temple of the Sun and is traditionally believed to be where Manco Cápac and Mama Ocllo, the legendary founders of the Inca civilization, were sent to earth by the sun god. The temple was likely constructed by Topa Inca Yupanqui (who ruled around 1471–93), it is a two-story structure measuring 50 by 43 feet (15 by 13 meters) that features galleries carved from local stone, and surrounded by fountains and gardens. The Isla de la Luna, Spanish for "Island of the Moon", is the smaller island located east of the Isla del Sol. Legends in Inca mythology refer to the island as the location where Viracocha commanded the rising of the moon.
- Eduardo Avaroa Andean Fauna National Reserve: It is Bolivia's most visited national reserve and spans an area of around 7000 square kilometers or 2700 square miles. Located in the southwestern region of the Potosí Department, bordering Chile and Argentina, the reserve is renowned for Mars-like landscape, featuring unique rock formations, active volcanoes and the abundance of saline lakes and lagoons of different colors. The main tourist attractions in this region include the Laguna Colorada (Spanish for Red Lagoon), a shallow saline with bright red waters due to the pigments of flagellate algae and mineral sediments, the Laguna Verde (Spanish for Green Lagoon) with one of the largest active volcanoes in the world, the Licancabur, and featuring bright green waters resulting from the high content of copper and arsenic, and the Laguna Hedionda (Spanish for Stinky Lagoon), notable for its pungent odor due to high levels of sulfur and the Laguna Blanca (Spanish for White Lagoon). These are some of several lagoons in the reserve and are all haven for various species of flamingoes, three of which are endemic to the region: The Andean flamingo, the James's flamingo and the Chilean flamingo. Within the reserve lies the Salvador Dalí Desert, an area with landscapes and rock formations that resemble the surrealist paintings of the Salvador Dalí. Lastly, important places that are frequently visited by tourists in the reserve are the various hot springs and geysers found throughout. Tourist are able to bathe in designated hot springs with water temperatures that are safe for bathing.
Places of Interest in the Eduardo Avaroa Andean Fauna National Reserve

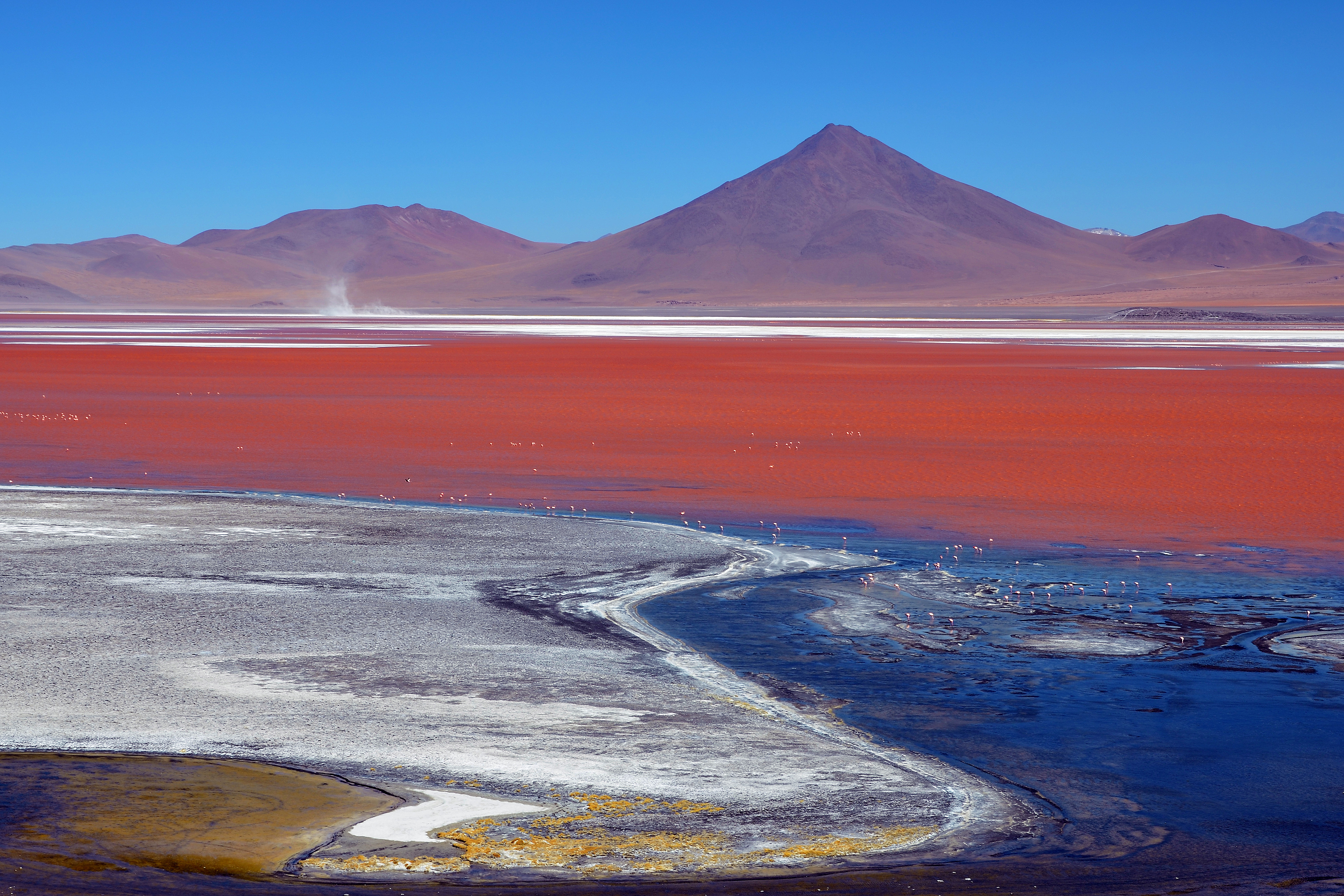
The Laguna Colorada ("Red Lagoon") features a bright red color derived from algae and mineral deposits.

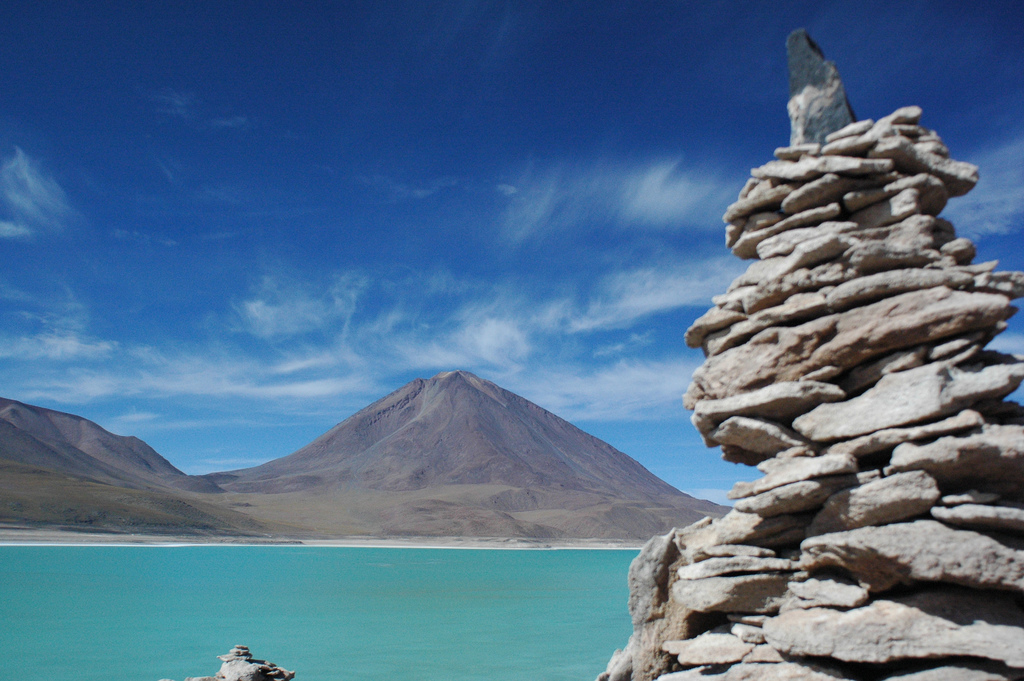
The Laguna Verde ("Green Lagoon") with the Licancabur volcano in the background.

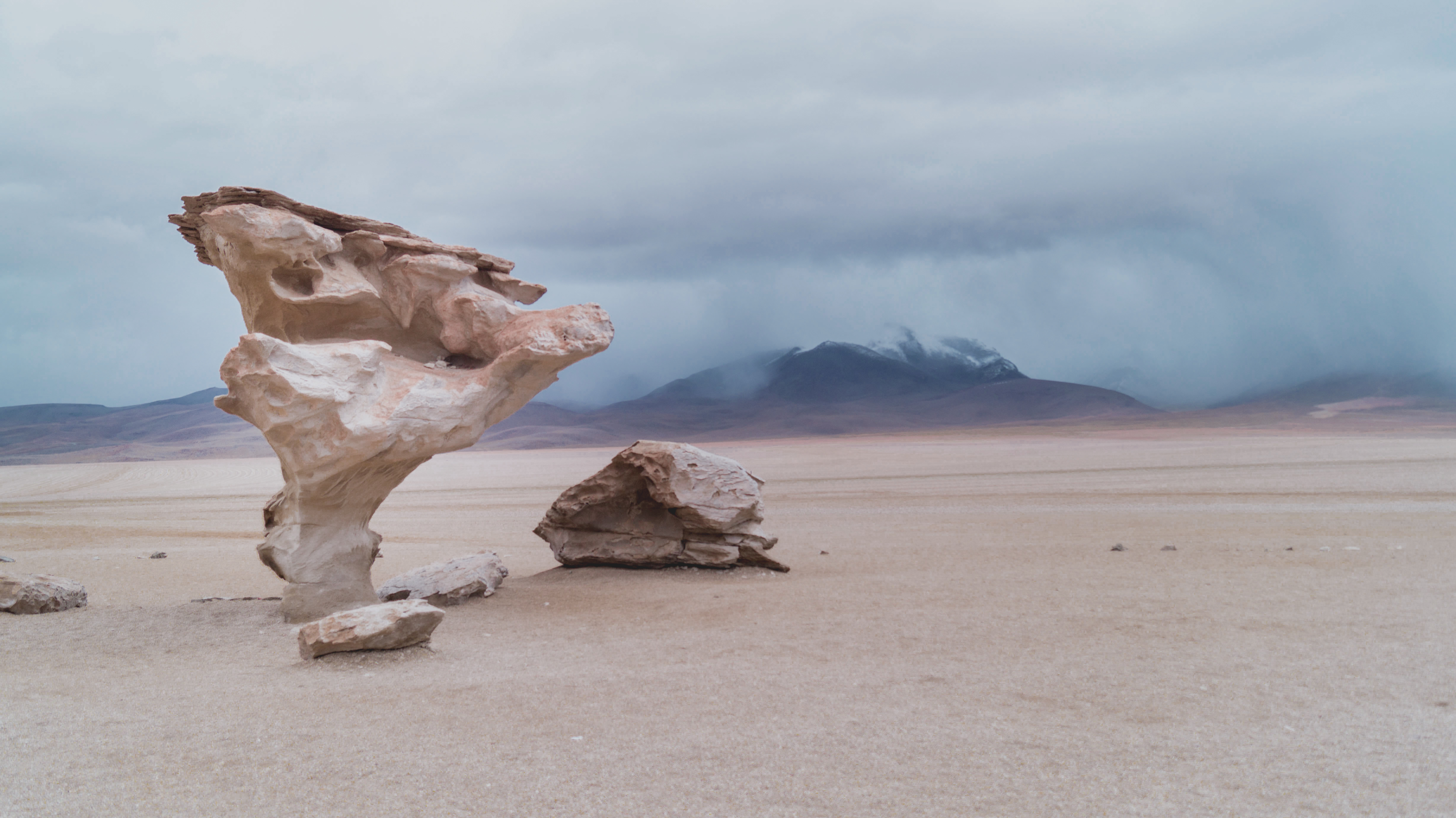
The Árbol de Piedra ("Stone Tree") within the Salvador Dalí Desert.

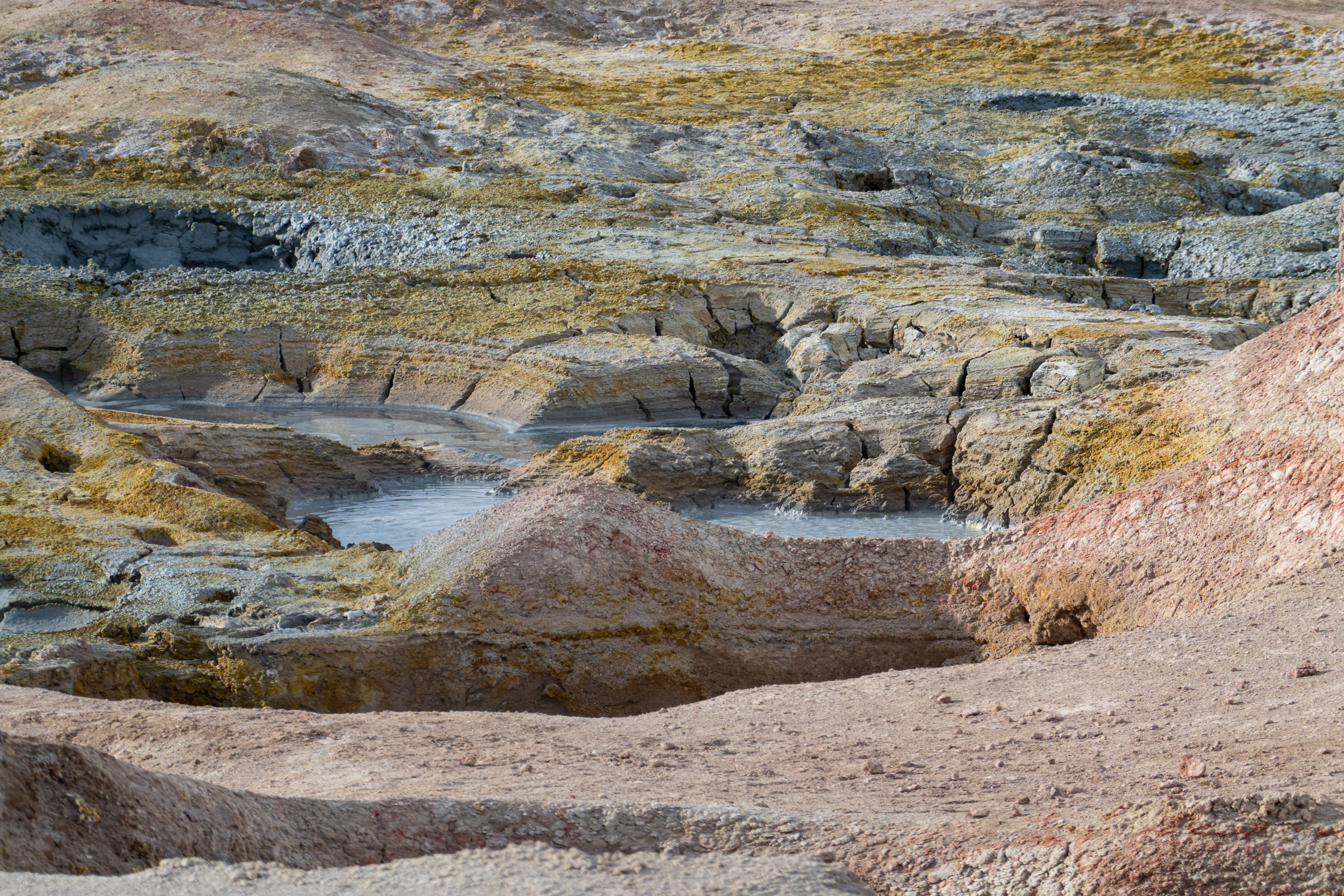
Sol de Mañana, an area with high levels of geothermal activity.

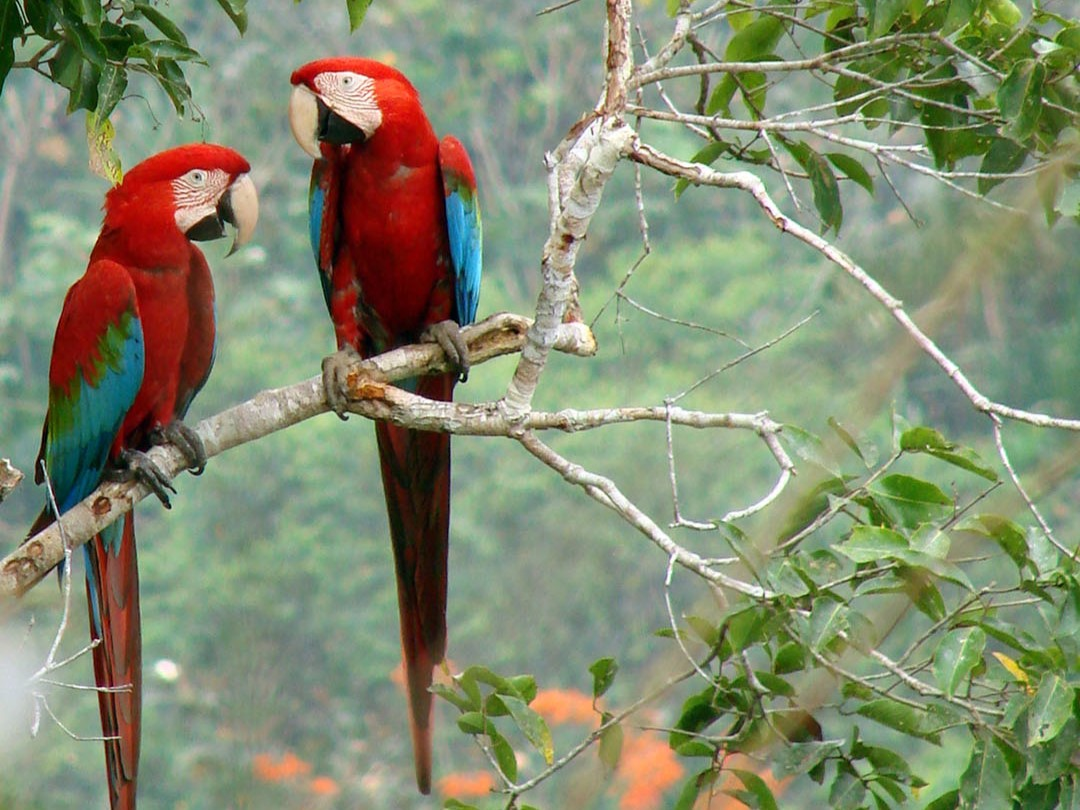
A pair of red-and-green macaws at Madidi National Park

- The Madidi National Park: Located in the upper Amazon river basin, it covers an area of 18,958 square kilometers or 7320 square miles. Together with the nearby protected areas Manuripi-Heath and the Manu Biosphere Reserve in Peru, Madidi is part of one of the largest protected areas in the world. The park, is home to 31 indigenous communities with a population of 3,714 inhabitants. It boasts a record-breaking 6,000 plant species and 733 species of registered fauna, of which the majority are birds. The park has tropical rainforest landscapes with snowy mountains and glaciers in the background, high Andean lagoons, and deep valleys. It is an increasingly important place for ecotourism in Bolivia and a popular spot for wildlife observation and birdwatching. Access to Madidi is primarily through the town of Rurrenabaque, which sits on the banks of the Beni River and serves as both the gateway to Madidi and the hub for tourist lodging and park conservation entities.
- The Noel Kempff Mercado National Park: A UNESCO World Heritage Site with an area of 1,523,446 hectares or 5882.06 square miles, it is one of the largest and most intact natural reserves in the Amazon basin, located in the northeastern portion of the Santa Cruz Department, along the country's border with Brazil. The park covers an ancient sandstone mountain range known as the Serranía de Huanchaca, along with its surrounding river valleys and plains. It features a wide range of habitats, from lowland tropical rainforests at around 200 meters or 660 feet in elevation to open savannas at approximately 1000 meters or 3300 feet. Its terrain is characterized by cliffs and steep escarpments, surrounded by dense forests. The park's boundaries are defined by several large rivers that flow into the Amazon, featuring dramatic waterfalls, dense rainforests, flooded savannas, and lakes. Noel Kempff Mercado National Park is a hub of biodiversity, boasting more than 4,000 recorded plant species, including 26 that have been newly identified. The park's plant life features valuable timber species such as mahogany and rubber trees.
Places of interest in the Bolivian Amazon Basin

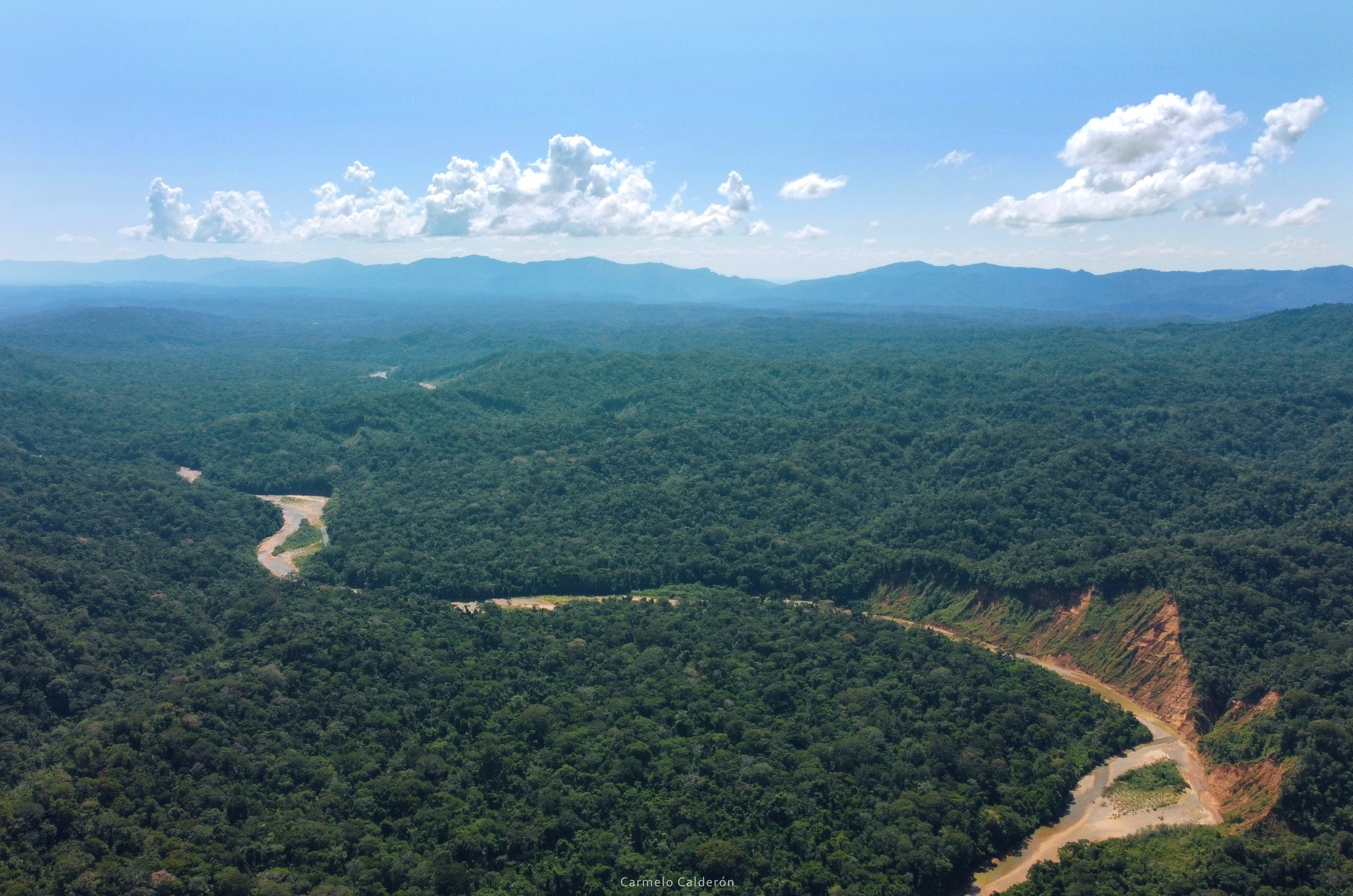
Madidi National Park in the La Paz Department

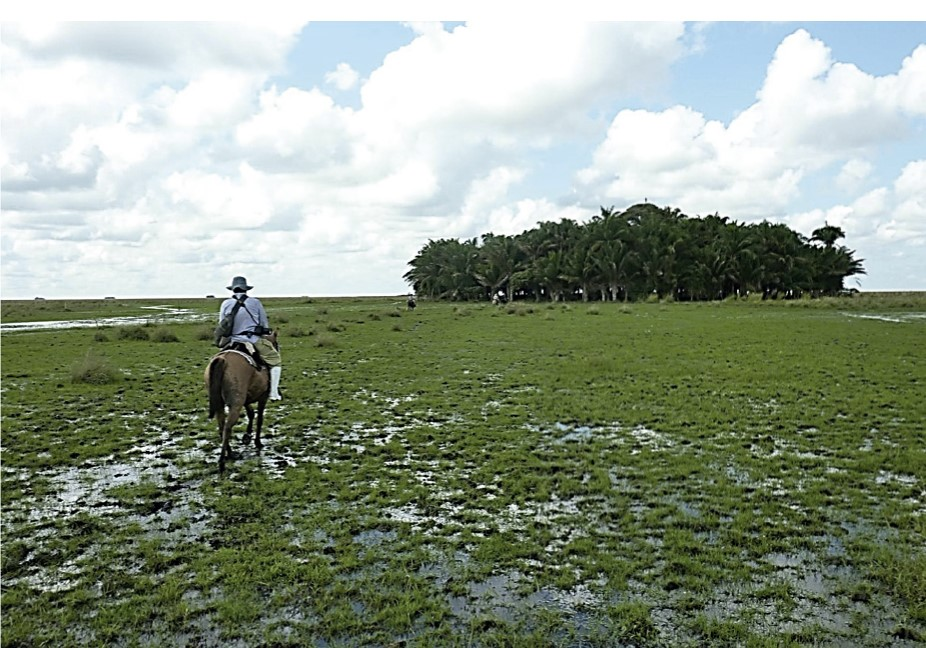
The Llanos de Moxos in the Beni Department

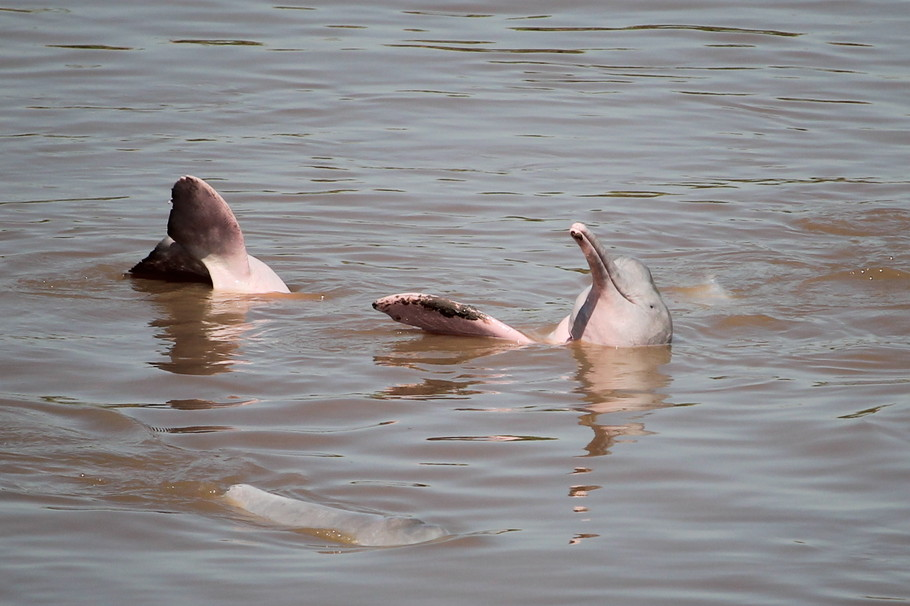
A Bolivian river dolphin in the Amazon Basin

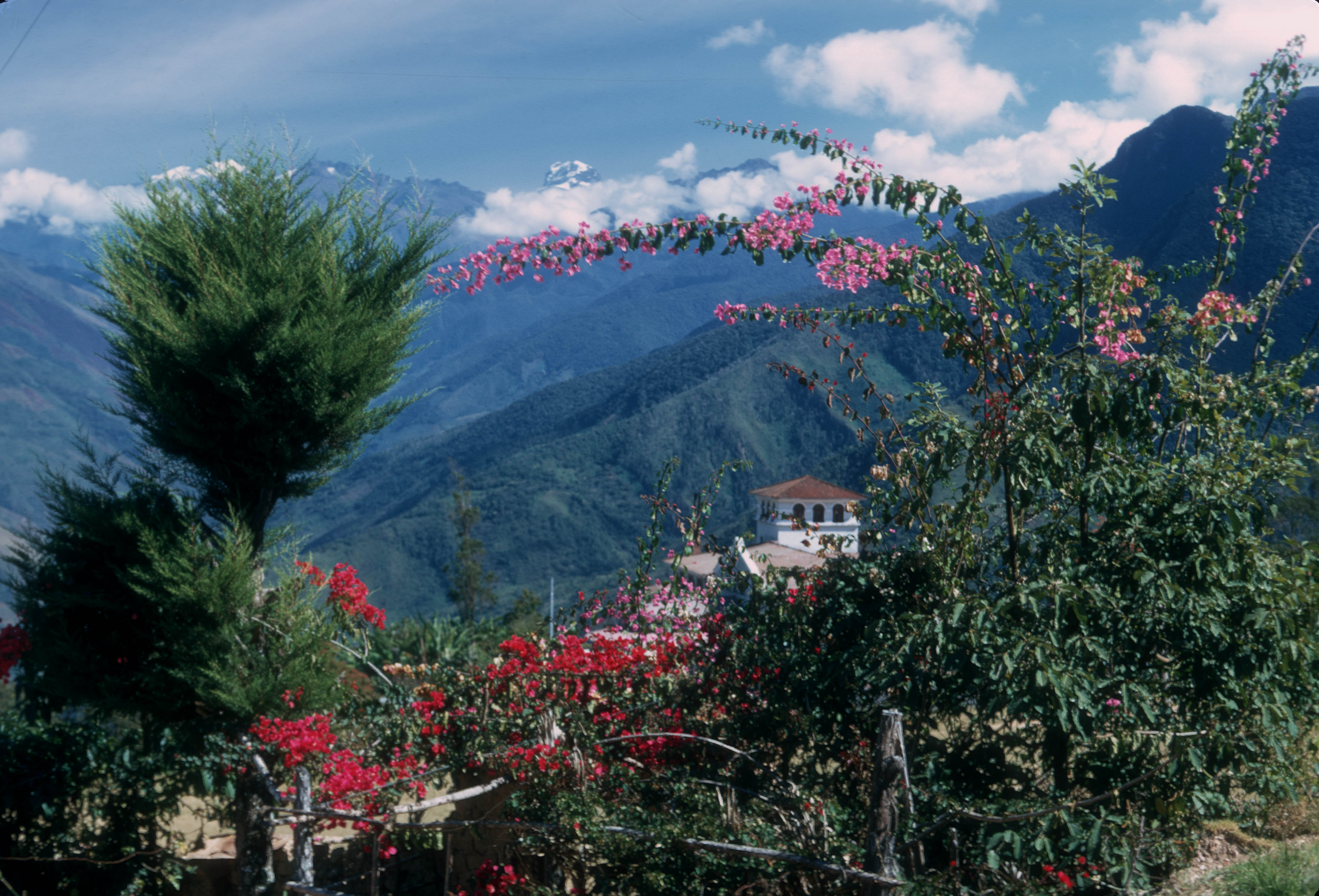
Coroico in the Yungas region.

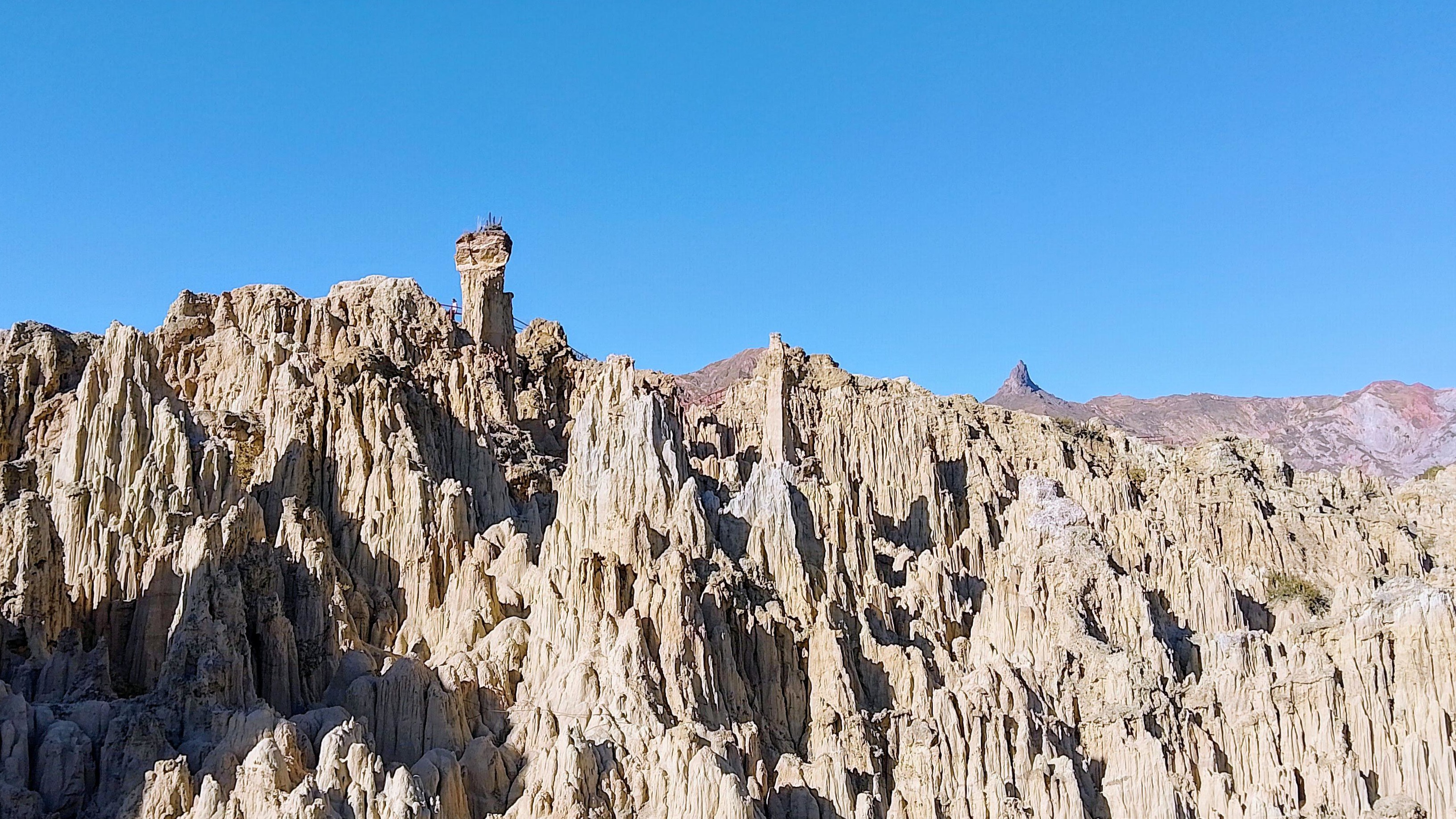
Valle de la Luna, known for its unique landscape of moon-like rock formations

- Valle de la Luna: Located in the neighborhood of Mallasa, about 10 kilometers or 6.2 miles from the city center of La Paz, Valle De La Luna (Spanish for “Moon Valley”) is a geological formation featuring a maze of towering rocky spires, canyons and crevices sculpted over thousands of years through the erosion of sandstone and clay, caused by the strong winds and heavy rains in the region and creating a lunar-like landscape. One of the most striking aspects of Valle de la Luna is its diverse color palette and stunning patterns that create optical illusions on the eroded slopes ranging from soft beige to vibrant red and purple tones, resulting from the varying mineral content in the different rock layers. Despite the barren appearance of the land, several cactus species thrive among the spires, including the San Pedro cactus, a hallucinogenic cactus endemic to the region. Visitors might also encounter a few lizards or viscachas. Local lore suggests that Valley de la Luna earned its name after Neil Armstrong visited and noted the landscape's similarity to the moon. Whether this story is true or not remains a matter of debate.

=== Adventure tourism ===
Bolivia's diverse geography offers a wide range of activities, including mountaineering, off-roading, rappelling, skiing, trekking, open water swimming, among others. High-altitude mountaineering is particularly popular in Bolivia. The Cordillera Real contains seven peaks above 6000 meters or 20,000 feet and over 600 mountains well over 5000 meters. The most popular peaks for mountain climbing are Huayna Potosí, Illimani, Kunturiri, and Illampu, all located near the city of La Paz, where tourists usually begin their expeditions from. Another popular peak for mountain climbing is Nevado Sajama, located in the Oruro Department. Of these, Illampu, Illimani and Sajama are reserved for highly experienced climbers due to their steep cliffs, while the rest can be accessed by intermediate level climbers. Trekking and hiking are also sought-after adventure activities in Bolivia; the famous Inca road system passes through the country, and there are various scenic trails found throughout, such as the ones in Isla del Sol and Cerro El Calvario in Lake Titicaca, the trails through the canyons and caves at the Torotoro National Park, the El Choro Trek, a popular three-day hiking route, and smaller trails around the towns of Challapampa, Chulumani, Coroico and Samaipata. Hiking trails are also found in the Amazon region of Bolivia, though these usually require guided tours due to the remoteness and foliage density in the region.

In 2014, Bolivia became the 28th country to host the Dakar Rally, the world's biggest annual rally raid event. Originally staged from Paris to Dakar in Senegal, the event has since taken place in South America, due to security concerns in Africa. The 8900 kilometers or 5500 miles route passes through Argentina, Bolivia and Chile, beginning and ending in Buenos Aires. It host around 500 competitors participating with specialized cars, trucks, motorcycles and quadbikes. The event is known for its harsh conditions, including passing through highly rugged terrain and withstanding extreme temperatures such as the hot climate in the Atacama Desert and the freezing weather in the Altiplano and the Andes mountain range. Bolivia's landscape contributes to the event with unique routes such as the standing water terrain of the Uyuni Salt Flats. The annual event promotes the South American country among foreign visitors.

- The Death Road, officially known as the North Yungas Road, is a 64-kilometre road connecting La Paz with the subtropical Yungas region up north. Parts of it are less than 3 meters or 10 feet wide, and due to presence of rain, fog, landslides, cascades, steep slopes and cliffs that drop more than 2000 feet or 610 meters, it is largely considered the most dangerous road in the world. It is currently a popular adventure tourism destination in the country, particularly for mountain biking, drawing 25,000 tourists per year.
Places of interest for adventure tourism in Bolivia

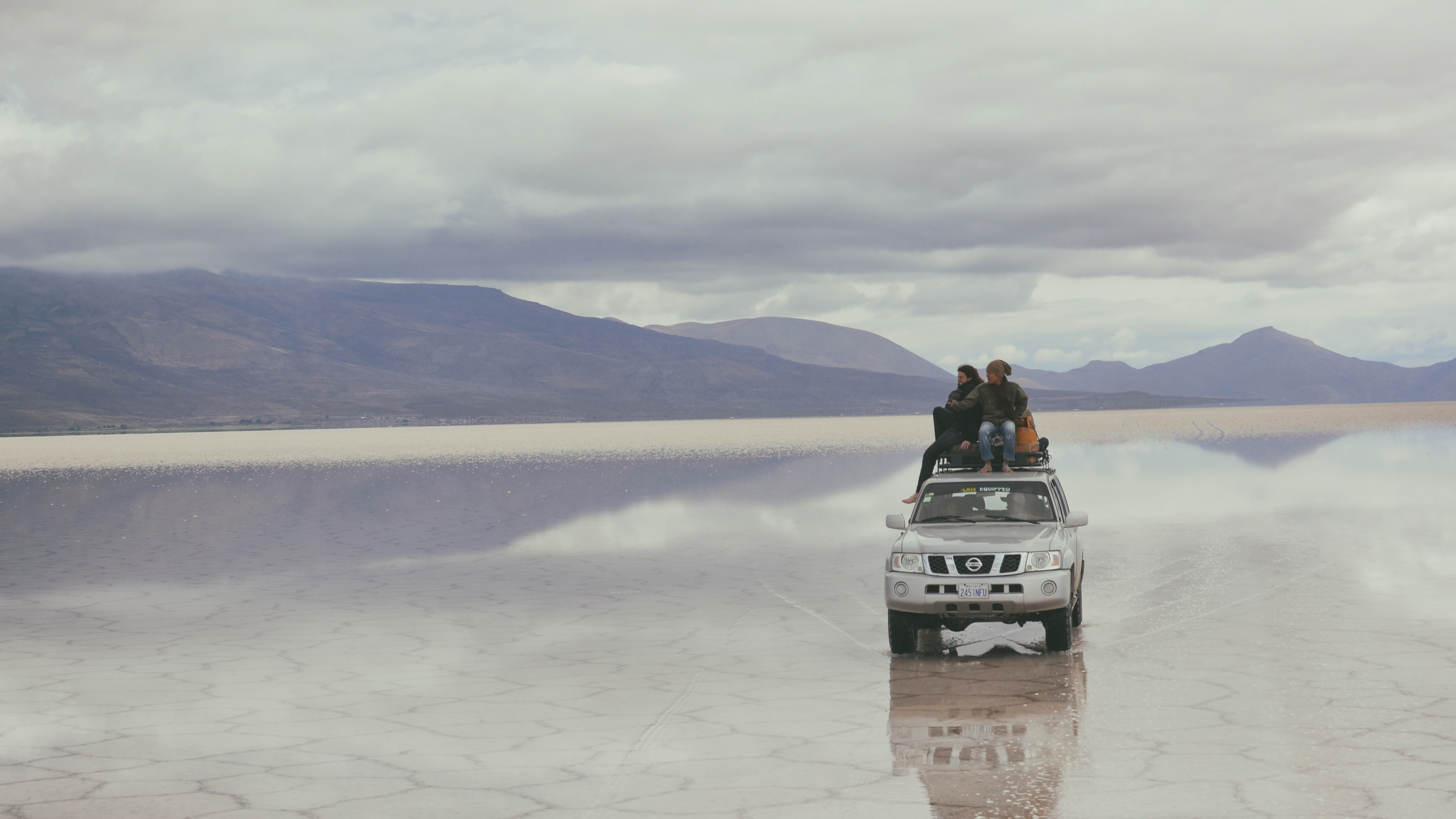
Tourists crossing the Salar de Uyuni by car

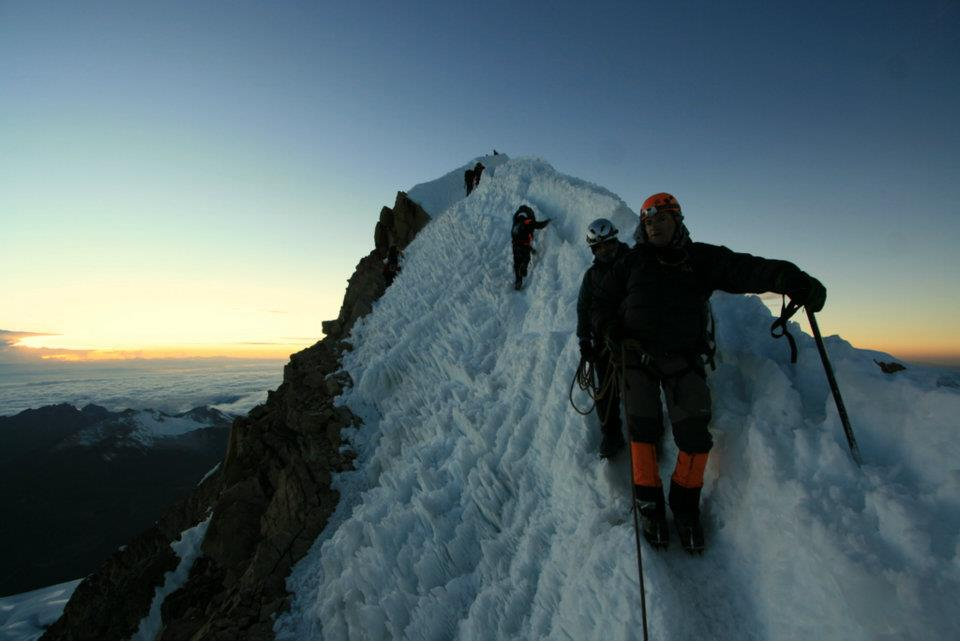
Mountaineers on the summit of Huayna Potosí

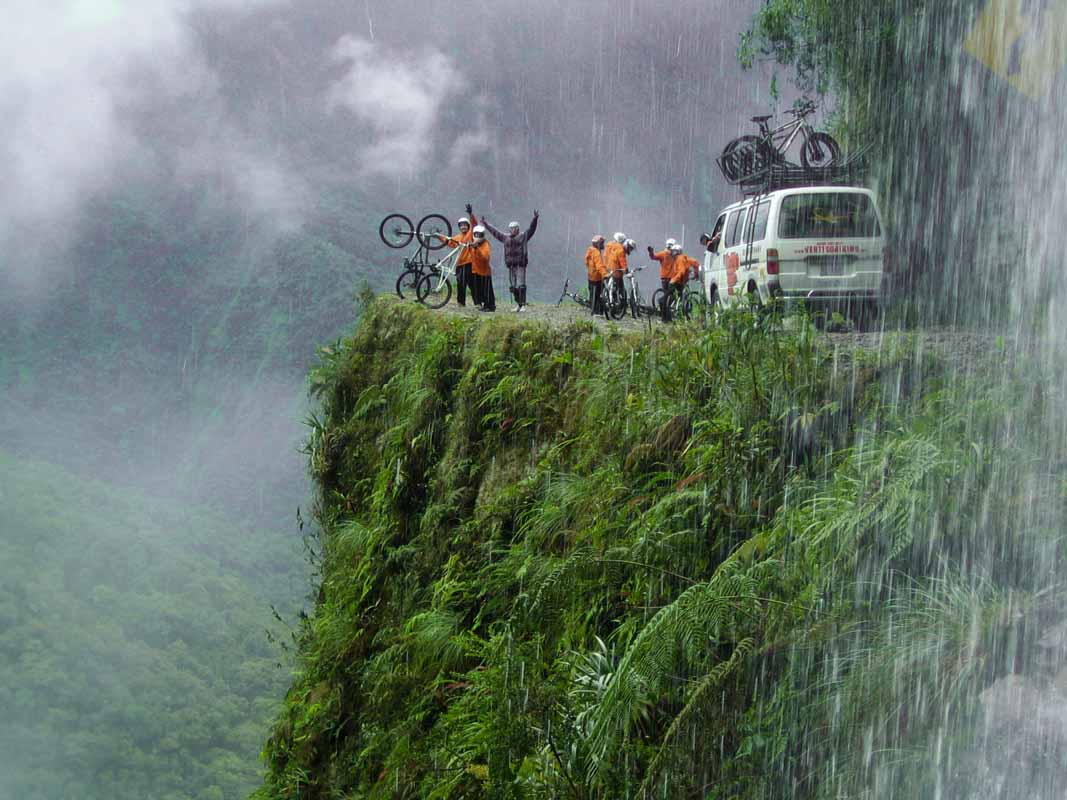
Mountain bikers on the Yungas Road, commonly known as the Death Road

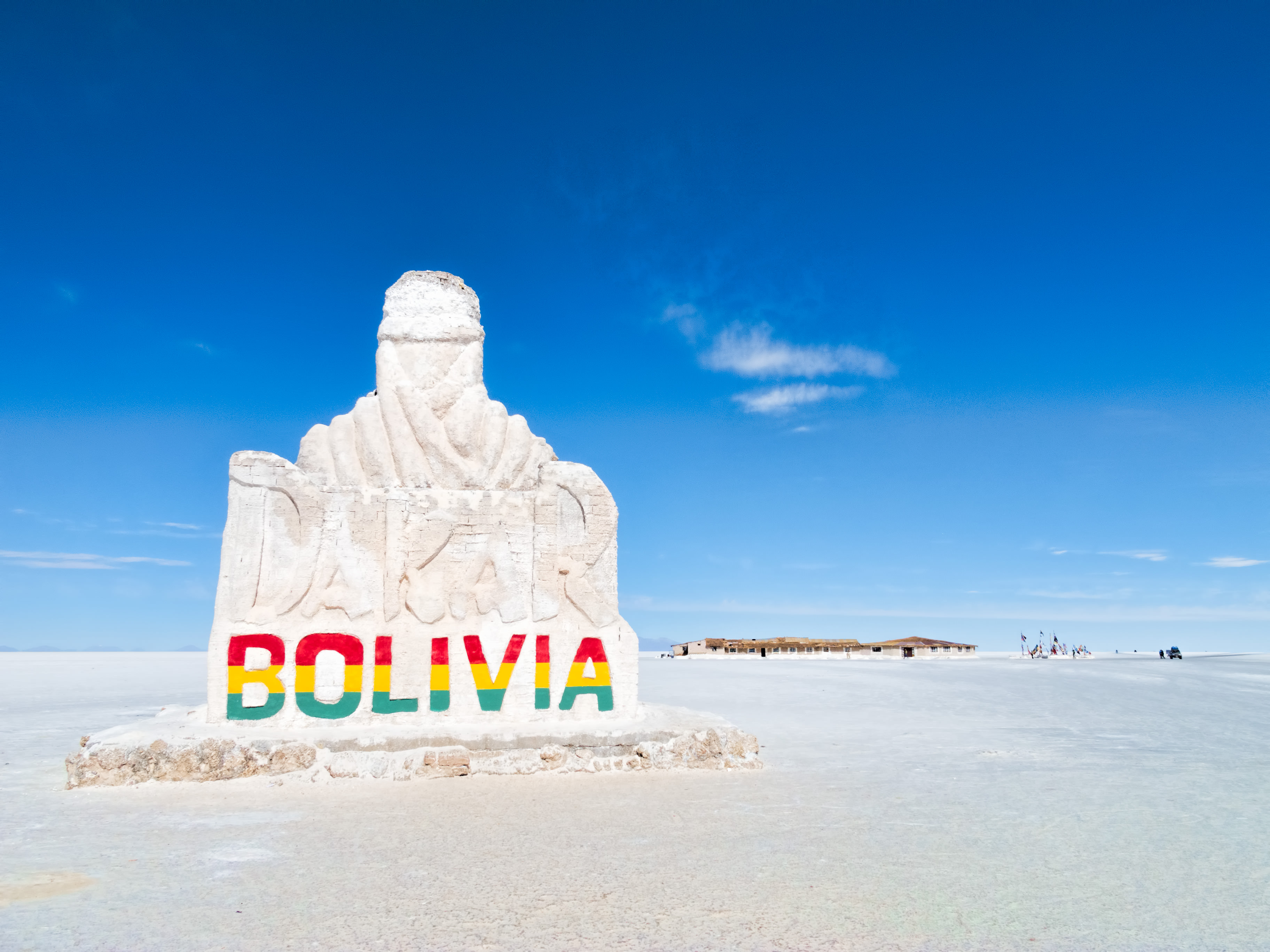
Salt sculpture marking the Dakar Rally’s route across the Salar de Uyuni

== Destinations ==
- Lake Titicaca, the world's highest navigable lake.
  - The Isla del Sol, the sacred place of the Incas and birthplace of the founders of the Inca Empire, Manco Cápac and Mama Ocllo
  - The Isla de la Luna, another sacred place of the Incas near the Isla del Sol.
  - Copacabana, a small town on the shores of Titicaca, home to the Virgin of Copacabana, crowned queen of Bolivia.
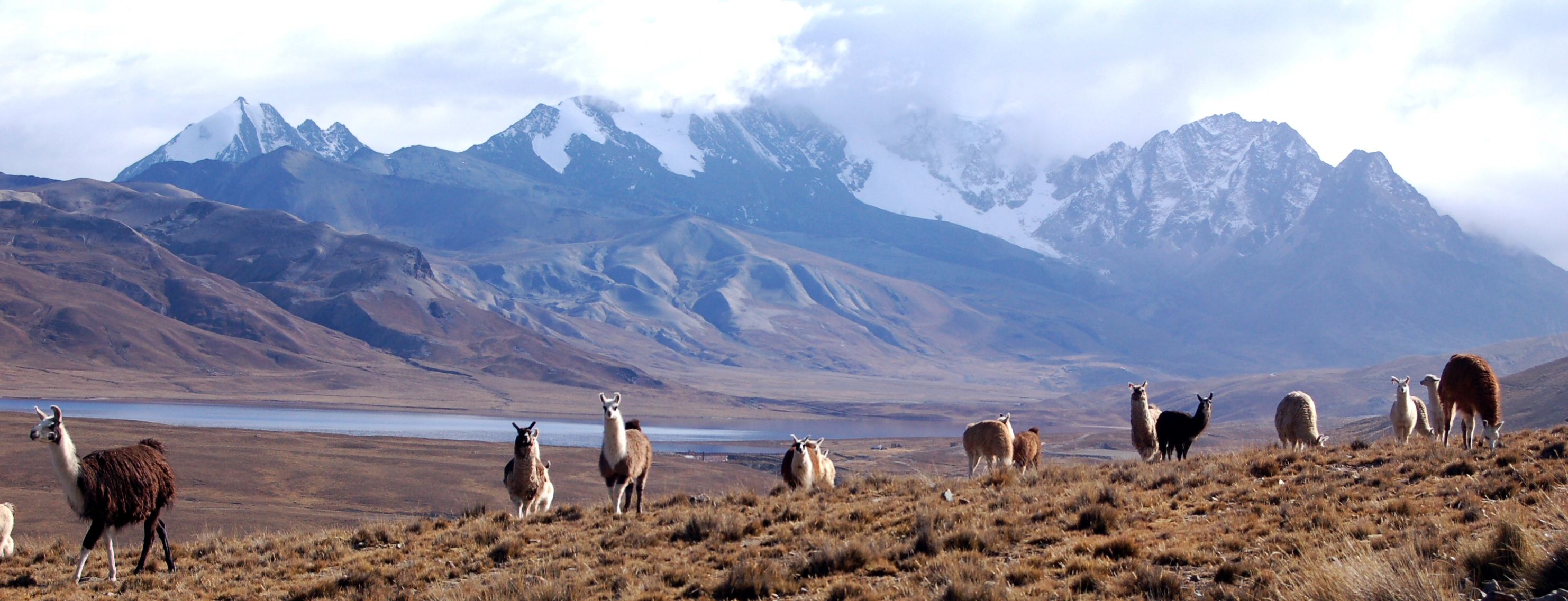
    A group of llamas grazing in the Bolivian Andes, a common sight outside La Paz.
- The Andes, the longest mountain range in the world, spanning the entire continent, which include:
  - The ski slope containing the highest restaurant in the world, called Chacaltaya.
  - The highest mountain in the country: Nevado Sajama, with the highest forest in the world.
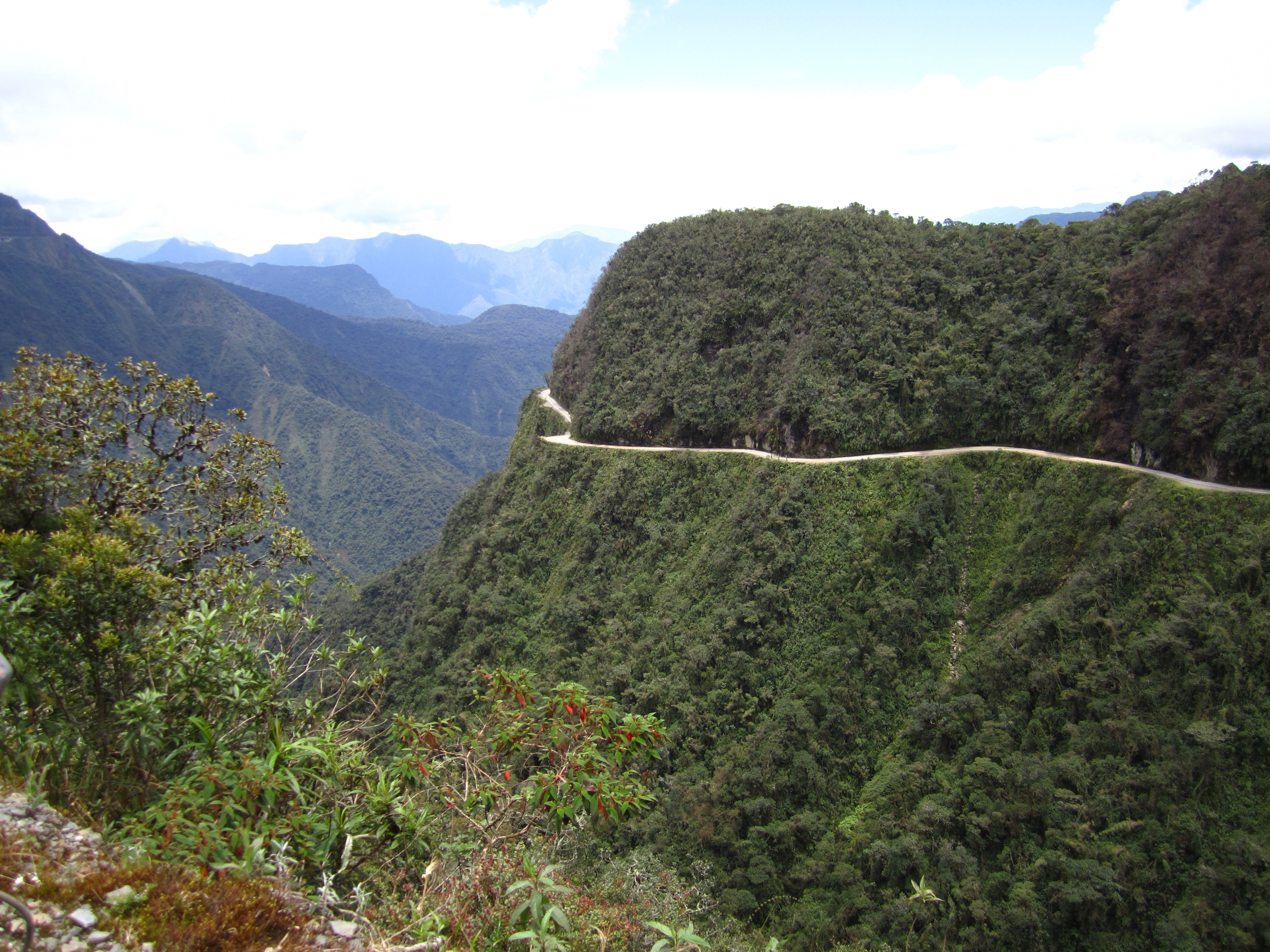
    The Yungas Road, commonly known as the "death road", was particularly dangerous for vehicular traffic and has claimed many lives during much of its operation. It has since been replaced and is now a popular tourist attraction for mountain biking.
  - The salt flats of Uyuni and Coipasa, the largest salt flats in the world.
    - Bolivia also is the only country in the world in having the only hotel totally fabricated of salt, found in the Uyuni.
  - The lakes Green lake and Red Lagoon, the sanctuary of the Andean flamingos with one of the largest active volcanoes in the world, the Licancabur.
  - The historic cities of:
    - Potosí with its Cerro Rico, formerly the largest deposit of silver in the world.
    - Sucre, the constitutional capital city of Bolivia, and The City of Four Names, which is home to one of the oldest universities in the Americas.
      - Casa de la Libertad, where the Declaration of Independence of Bolivia remains.
      - La Recoleta, a Franciscan monastery, one of the first in the city.
      - Cal Orcko is a paleontological site, found in the quarry of a cement factory, in the Department of Chuquisaca.
    - Ruins of Portugalete
  - Carnaval de Oruro
  - Abandoned mining sites, e.g. Pulacayo and Uncía
  - Tupiza with the graves of Butch Cassidy and The Sundance Kid
- Yungas
  - Coroico, Center of Afro-Bolivian culture
  - Carretera de la muerte, today a popular cycling route
- Amazon Basin:
  - The Madidi National Park, considered by National Geographic to be one of the most imprescidible places to visit in the world, is part of the circuit of tourism in Bolivia.
  - The Noel Kempff Mercado National Park, located in the department of SantHeritage, which was declared a World Heritage Site on 13 December 1991. The camps Flor de Oro (the principal camp) and Los Fierros have tourist infrastructure.
  - Jesuit Missions of Chiquitos

== See also ==
- Visa policy of Bolivia
- List of national parks of Bolivia
- Visitor attractions in Bolivia (category)
- Aquicuana Reserve
- Lake Titicaca
- Uyuni
