= National Institute of Statistics and Census =

National Institute of Statistics and Census (Spanish: Instituto Nacional de Estadística y Censos; Portuguese: Instituto Nacional de Estatistica e Censos) may refer to:

- National Institute of Statistics and Census of Argentina
- National Institute of Statistics and Census of Costa Rica
- National Institute of Statistics and Census of Nicaragua

== See also ==
- List of national and international statistical services
- National Institute of Statistics (disambiguation)
- Instituto Nacional de Estadística (disambiguation)
- Instituto Nacional de Estadística e Informática
