= National Institute of Statistics (Guatemala) =

- Instituto Nacional de Estadística (INE)
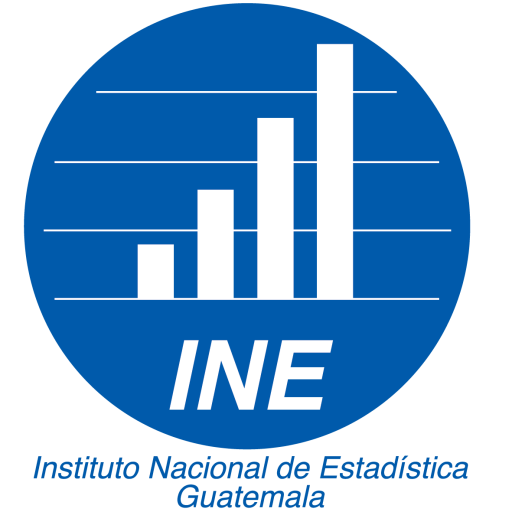

Agency overview
- Formed: 1985
- Preceding agency: Dirección General de Estadística
- Jurisdiction: Government of Guatemala
- Headquarters: Guatemala City
- Agency executive: Néstor Mauricio Guerra Morales
- Parent agency: Guatemalan Economic Ministry
- Website: http://www.ine.gob.gt

The National Statistics Institute of Guatemala (Spanish: Instituto Nacional de Estadística de Guatemala, INE) is the statistics agency of the Government of Guatemala. It has responsibility to collect, prepare, and publish official statistics. INE runs the population census and issues statistics on employment, price levels, poverty rates, and other standard national statistics.

INE will conduct a population census of Guatemala in July and August 2018, the twelfth such census.

INE publishes monthly consumer price index (CPI) statistics. Annual consumer price inflation was estimated at 4-5% in 2016.

INE publishes general agriculture, health, and environmental statistics.
