= Nicaragua National Institute of Information Development =

The National Institute of Information Development of Nicaragua; (Spanish: Instituto Nacional de Información de Desarollo de Nicaragua (INIDE)), is responsible for completing censuses and surveys. The 8th population and the 4th dwellings census was carried out in 2005.

== History ==
INEC was established as Dirección General de Estadística in 1905. The organization faced financial troubles in the beginning and closed several times through 1939. When the Sandinistas won the Revolution, the statistical office was renamed to INIDE. INIDE conducted its first census in 2005, and is expected to continue every ten years.

== Censuses in Nicaragua ==
- 1906. First Population Census.
- 1920. Second Population Census.
- 1940. Third Population Census.
- 1950. Fourth Population Census.
- 1963. Fifth Population Census.
- 1971. Sixth Population Census.
- 1995. Seventh Population Census.
- 2005. Eighth Population Census.
