= National Institute of Statistics of Bolivia =

Bolivia's principal government institution in charge of statistics and census data

National Institute of Statistics
- Instituto Nacional de Estadística
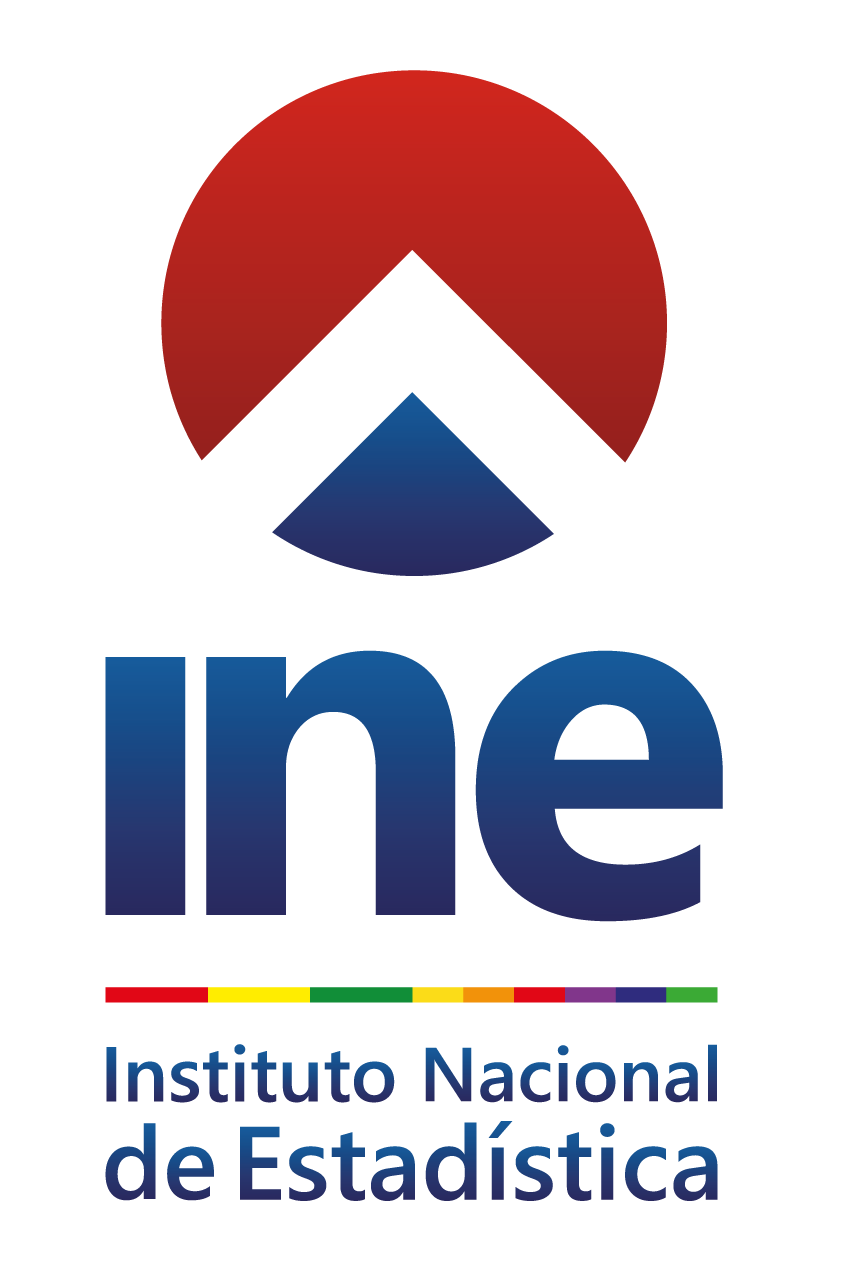
- Logo of the National Institute of Statistics

Agency overview
- Formed: April 30, 1970; 56 years ago
- Preceding agencies: General Director of Statistics and Censuses (1936–70); National Office of Immigration, Statistics, and Geographics Propaganda (1896–1936); Statistics Bureau (1863–96)
- Jurisdiction: Government of Bolivia
- Headquarters: Calle Carrasco 1391, La Paz, Bolivia; 16°29′57″S 68°07′17″W
- Annual budget: 388,20 million BOB
- Parent agency: Ministry of Planning and Development
- Website: Official website

The Instituto Nacional de Estadística de Bolivia or National Institute of Statistics of Bolivia is a branch of the Government of Bolivia which specifically collects factual data in the country of Bolivia in South America. The Institute compiles statistics ranging from the area of its provinces and municipalities to population structure, and demographics and education. It also provides information on transport services and industry and salary details and electricity rates.
