= Brian Temba =

- Birth name: Brian Thembalethu Makiwane
- Born: 9 December 1977 (age 47); Eastern Cape, South Africa
- Occupation(s): Actor, performer, singer, songwriter, producer

Brian Temba (born 9 December 1977) is a South African actor, performer, singer, songwriter and producer. He was born in the Eastern Cape province. He speaks four languages. He is known for his role as Ranthumeng Mokoena in the South African soap opera Muvhango and his role as Simba in the West End musical The Lion King.

== Career ==
=== Theatre ===
- Simba in The Lion King (2003–2008: West End)
- u/s Simba/Ensemble in The Lion King (2000–2001: Panteges Theatre, Los Angeles)
- Ensemble in Lion and the lamb (1999: Market Theatre, South Africa)

=== Television ===
- Omar in Hip-Hop Opera (Urban Concepts, London)
- Featured Artist in Back stage (ETV)
- Brian in Generations (SABC 1)
- guest at The Jay Leno Show (Los Angeles)
- guest at Felicia Mabuza-Suttle (South Africa)
- Ranthumeng Mokoena in "Muvhango (South African TV series)"(SABC 2)

=== Recordings ===
- Joyous Celebration Tenor Singer on Joyous Celebration 4 (2000)
- Amazing Grace (film soundtrack)
- Roger and Sam Grandison Live in London, featured on track Awesome Wonder
- Mamani by Joy Denalane (2002)
- Something Better by Brian Temba (2009)
- T.I.M.T This Is My Time By Brian Temba (2012)
