= Yampupata =

Coordinates: 16°05′S 69°13′W

- Town
- Interactive map of Yampupata
- Country: Bolivia
- Elevation: 12,582 ft (3,835 m)

Population (2012 census)
  - Total: 365
- Time zone: UTC-4 (BOT)
- Postal code: 02-1701-0300-1001
- Area code: +59i

Yampupata is a small town in the department of La Paz in Bolivia, located in the Cantón Zampaya in the municipality of Copacabana in the province of Manco Kapac.

== Population ==
The town's population increased by almost a third in the decade between the 2001 and 2012 censuses :

Year	Population	Source
1992	No details available	census
2001	279	census
2012	365	census

Due to the historical population development, the region has a high proportion of Aymara population, in the Municipio Copacabana 94.3% of the population speak the Aymara language.
