= Mamani =

Mamani is a surname, and may refer to:

- Abdoulaye Mamani (1932–1993), Nigerian poet, novelist and trade unionist
- Mohammad Reza Mamani (born 1982), Iranian footballer
- Moisés Mamani (1969–2020), Peruvian politician
- Elías Blanco Mamani (born 1962), Bolivian biographer
- Isabella Mamani (born 1982), Aymara activist and politician from Chile
- Roberto Mamani Mamani (born 1962), Aymara artist from Bolivia
- Teobaldo Nina Mamani (born 1965), Peruvian painter and teacher
- Freddy Mamani (architect) (born 1971), Bolivian architect
- Freddy Mamani (born 1974), Bolivian politician
- Manuel Incra Mamani (died 1871), a Bolivian plant collector

== Other uses ==
- Mamani (album), 2002
- Queen Mamani of the Amampondomise
