= Copacabana Municipality, La Paz =

Copacabana Municipality
- Municipality
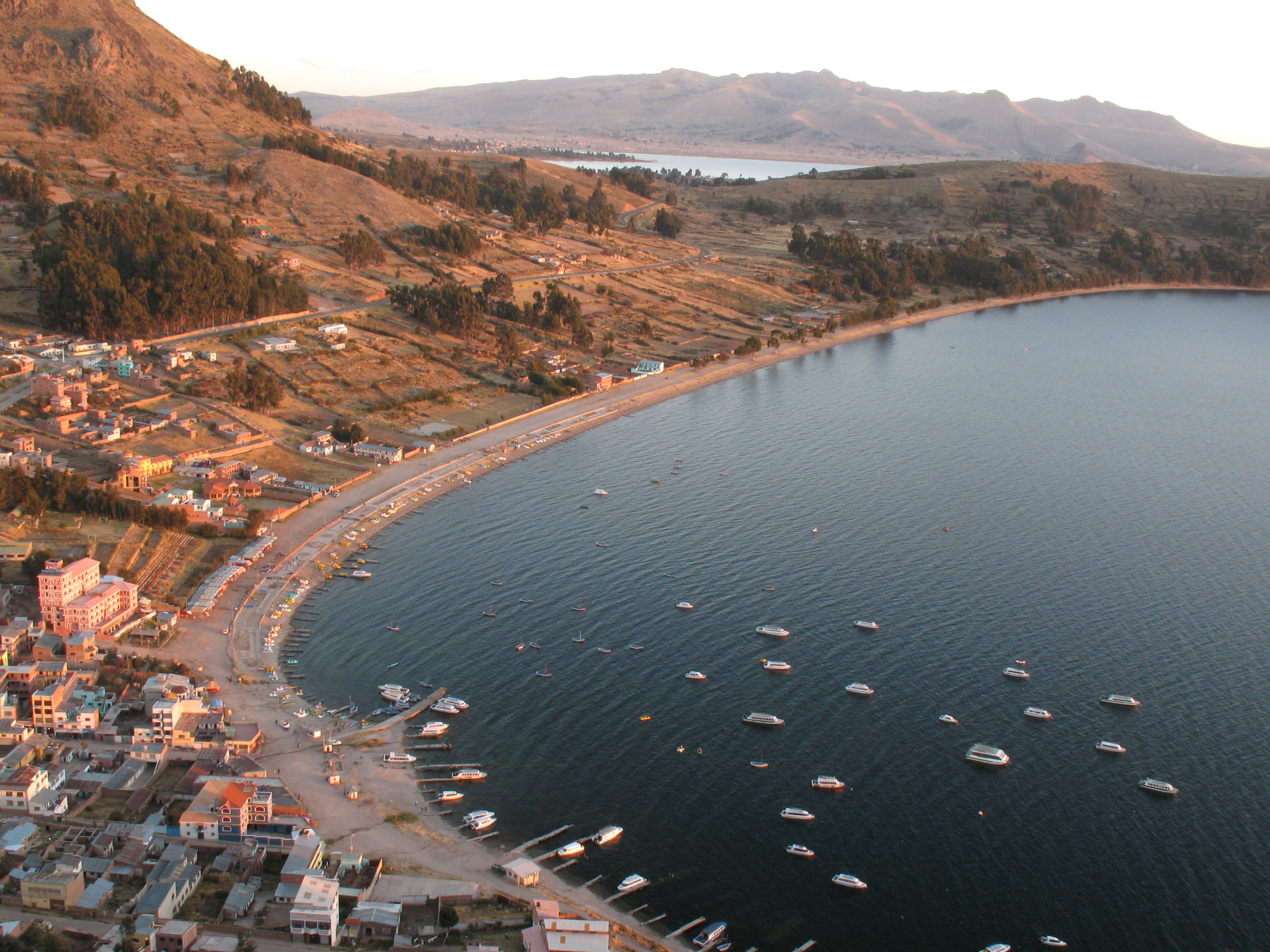
- Copacabana and Lake Titicaca

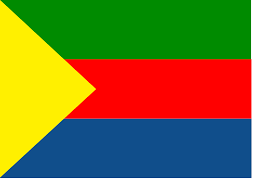
- Flag

- Location of the Arani Municipality within Bolivia
- Coordinates: 16°9′0″S 69°2′0″W
- Country: Bolivia
- Department: La Paz Department
- Province: Manco Kapac Province
- Seat: Copacabana

Government
  - Mayor: Juan Armando Callisaya Quispe
  - President: Adela Calizaya de Mamani

Area
  - Total: 67 sq mi (174 km^{2})
- Elevation: 12,630 ft (3,850 m)

Population (2001)
  - Total: 14,586
  - Ethnicities: Aymara
- Time zone: UTC-4 (BOT)

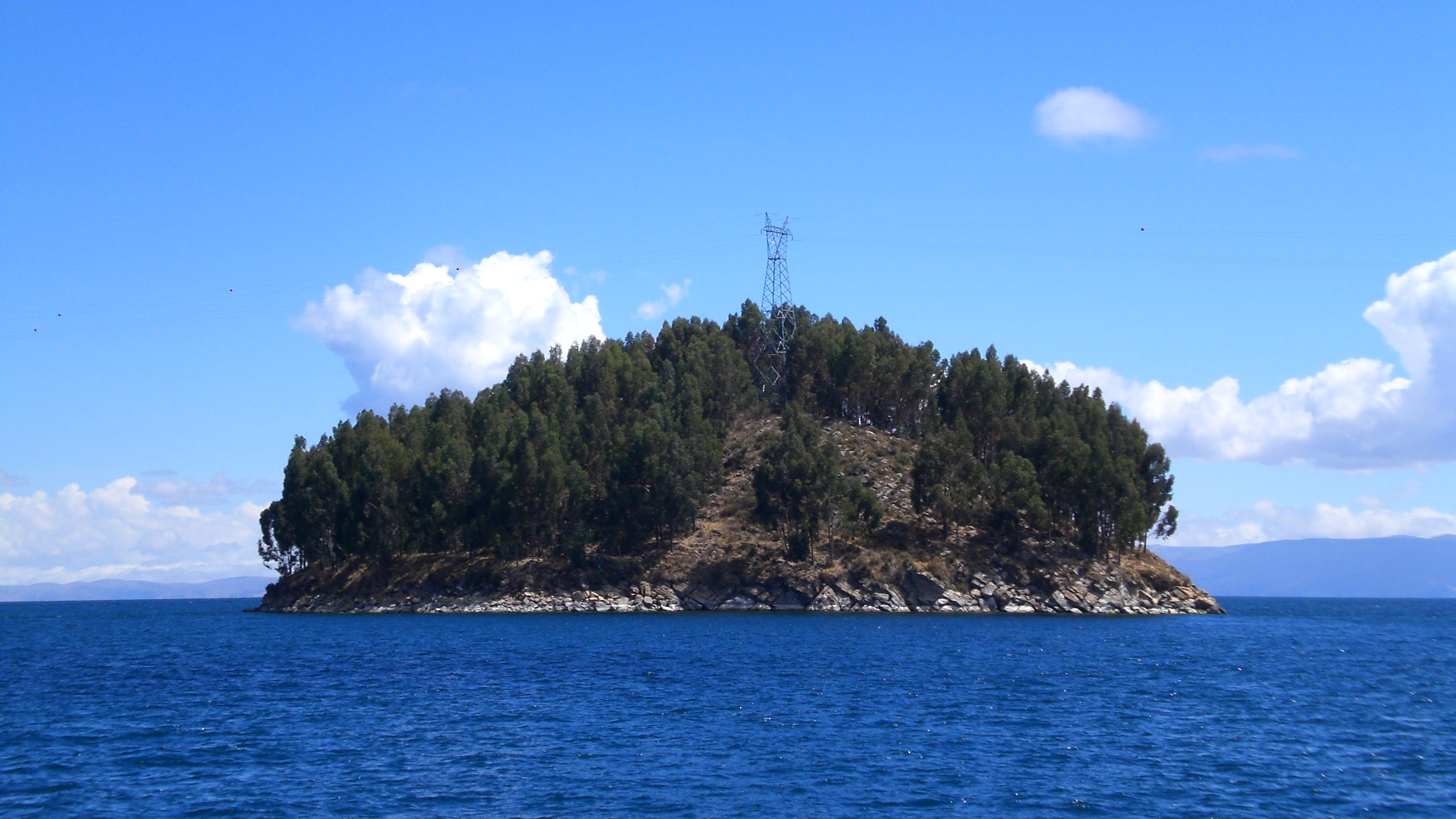
Chelleca island, Lake Titicaca

Copacabana Municipality is the first municipal section of the Manco Kapac Province in the La Paz Department, Bolivia. Its capital is Copacabana.

Isla del Sol (Island of the Sun) and Chelleca island are situated within the municipality.

== Subdivision ==
The municipality was formerly, before the abolition of Bolivian cantons in 2009, divided into three cantons.

Canton	Inhabitants (2001)	Seat
Copacabana Canton	8,194	Copacabana
Lokha Canton	2,388	Lokha
Zampaya Canton	4,004	Zampaya

== The people ==
The people are predominantly indigenous citizens of Aymaran descent.

Ethnic group	%
Quechua	0.9
Aymara	95.9
Guaraní, Chiquitos, Moxos	0.2
Not indigenous	3.0
Other indigenous groups	0.1

Ref.: obd.descentralizacion.gov.bo

== Languages ==
The languages spoken in the Copacabana Municipality are mainly Aymara and Spanish.

Language	Inhabitants
Quechua	185
Aymara	11,825
Guaraní	6
Another native	4
Spanish	10,713
Foreign	81
Only native	3,020
Native and Spanish	8,858
Only Spanish	1,857

== Places of interest ==
- Chinkana
- Iñaq Uyu
- Pachat'aqa
- Pillkukayna
- Yampupata
- Yampupata Peninsula

== See also ==
- Virgen de Copacabana
