= Rosa Jalja =

Aymara Bolivian ecologist (born 1950s)

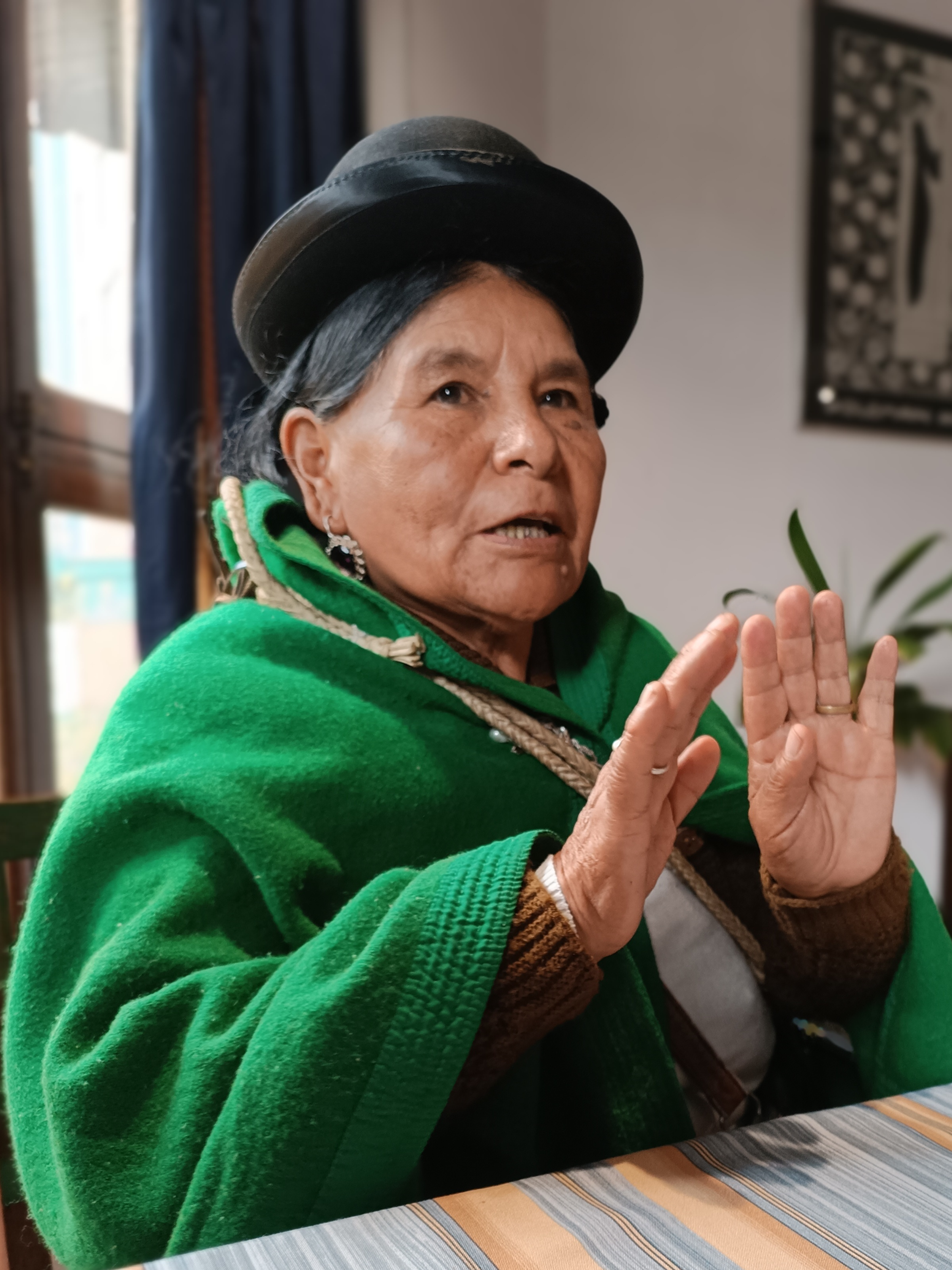
- Jalja in 2023
- Born: 1950s Zampaya, Bolivia
- Occupations: Indigenous leader, radio journalist

Rosa Jalja (born 1950s) is an Aymara Bolivian ecologist and radio journalist. She is a leading figure in the Bartolina Sisa Confederation and a leading environmental activist campaigning for Lake Titicaca.

== Career ==
Jalja was born in the 1950s in Zampaya, Bolivia, on the shores of Lake Titicaca. She is member of the Aymara people. She began to become aware of the need to care for Lake Titicaca, which is sacred to the Aymara, when she accompanied her grandfather to fish.

She is part of the Network of United Women in Defence of Water, an organisation created by women from various communities on the Bolivian shore of Lake Titicaca with the aim of protecting the lake from pollution and environmental degradation since 2010s. Through the network, its members, many of them Aymara, promote environmental education activities, clean-up campaigns, water quality monitoring and awareness-raising actions aimed at local communities.

Jalja draws attention to the serious threats that Lake Titicaca faces from pollution, overfishing and the progressive disappearance of native fish species, such as the mauri and the karachi. With the support of the organisation Agua Sustentable, since 2016 Rosa Jalja and other women leaders have received training in environmental monitoring, including techniques for analysing water quality and the use of new technologies, such as drones, to identify sources of pollution. They also collaborate with Bolivian and Peruvian institutions to promote joint and sustainable management of Lake Titicaca. Jalja promotes the role of women in the conservation of the Tititcaca.

She is also a radio journalist for Radio Copacabana and a leading figure of the Bartolina Sisa Confederation.
