= Copacabana Municipality =

Copacabana Municipality may refer to:

- Copacabana Municipality, La Paz, Bolivia
- Copacabana, Antioquia, Colombia
