= Aymara people =

Indigenous peoples of western South America

Aymara
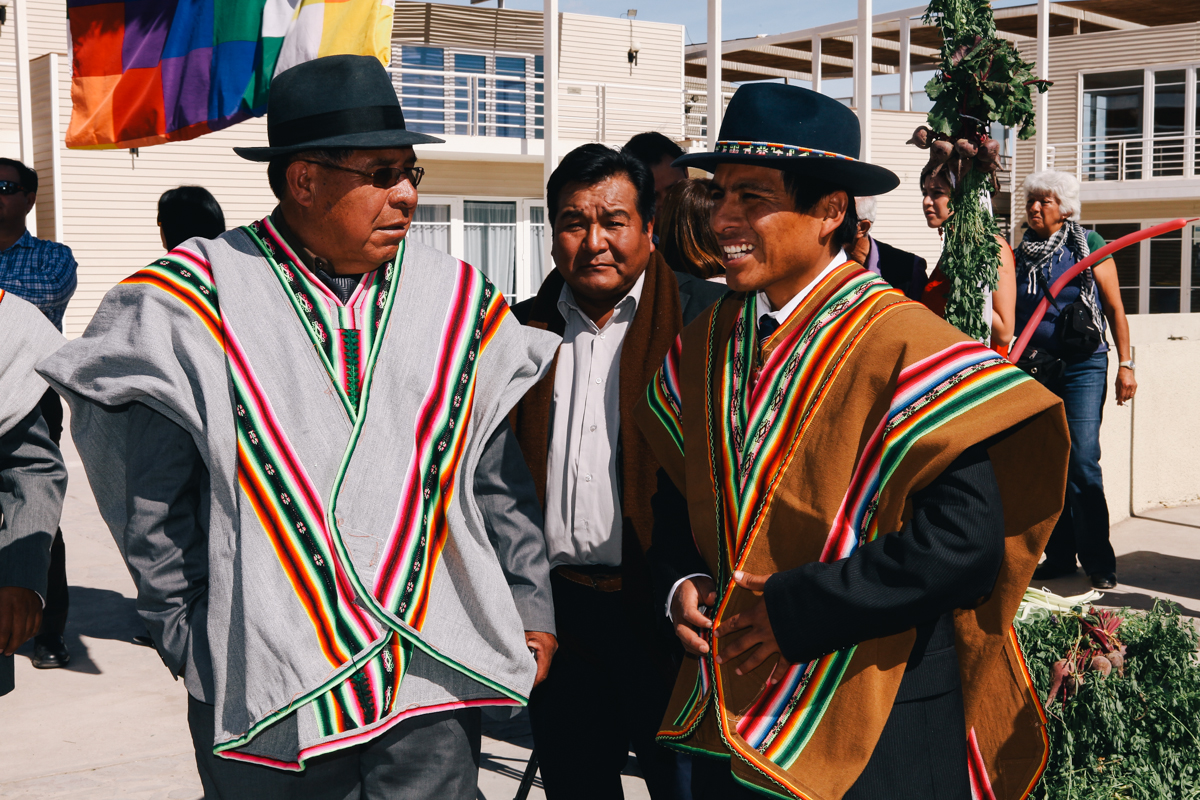
- Aymara people in Tarapacá, Chile

Total population
- 2,324,675

Regions with significant populations
- Bolivia: 1,594,248
- Peru: 655,552
- Chile: 178,637
- Argentina: 19,247

Languages
- Aymara • Spanish

Religion
- Majority: Catholicism; Minority: Evangelicalism; Traditional • Islam

Related ethnic groups
- Quechuas and Urus

The Aymara or Aimara (Aymara: aymara,) people are an Indigenous people in the Andes and Altiplano regions of South America. Approximately 2.3 million Aymara live in northwest Argentina, Bolivia, Chile, and Peru.

The Aymara have lived in the region for over 7,250 years. In the late 15th century or early 16th century, Aymaras came under the rule of the Inca Empire and later of the Spanish Empire in the 16th century. Following the Spanish American wars of independence (1810–1825), the Aymara became subjects to the new nations of Bolivia and Peru. After the War of the Pacific (1879–1883), Chile annexed territory inhabited by the Aymara population.

== Etymology ==
The name of the Aymara people stems from the word Ayma-ra-mi meaning "a place with many communally owned farms". The word "Aymara" also refers to a group of language dialects of which the origin, spread and time-frame are debated.

== History ==
=== Early history ===
According to research by the Max Planck Institute, the ancestors of the Aymara people have a continuous genetic heritage in the Andean highlands dating back at least 8,750 years to around 6750 BCE, the Late Mesolithic / Early Neolithic, showing close ties to the region's earliest settlers and adaptations to the high-altitude environment. While genetics supports Aymara's deep human roots in the region, linguistic evidence suggests the modern Aymara language developed later.

The early history of the Aymara people is uncertain. Various hypotheses have been voiced. Archeological data of the Titicaca basin in the Altiplano (high plain) comes from the site of the ancient city of Tiwanaku. A radiocarbon dating study suggests the ancient city was founded in about 110 AD. Origin legends of the Aymara people in terms of time frame seem inconsistent to archeologists. Archeologist Carlos Mamani Condori suggests this is because the Aymara tradition may see the passage of time as a continuum rather than in terms of prehistory and history. The Aymara may have been settlers from elsewhere rather than the builders of the ancient city. Pedro Cieza de León (1518–1554), the Spanish chronicler of Peru, wrote that the Aymara people he met did not know who had built the ancient city.

=== Inca era ===
==== Kingdom of Cusco ====
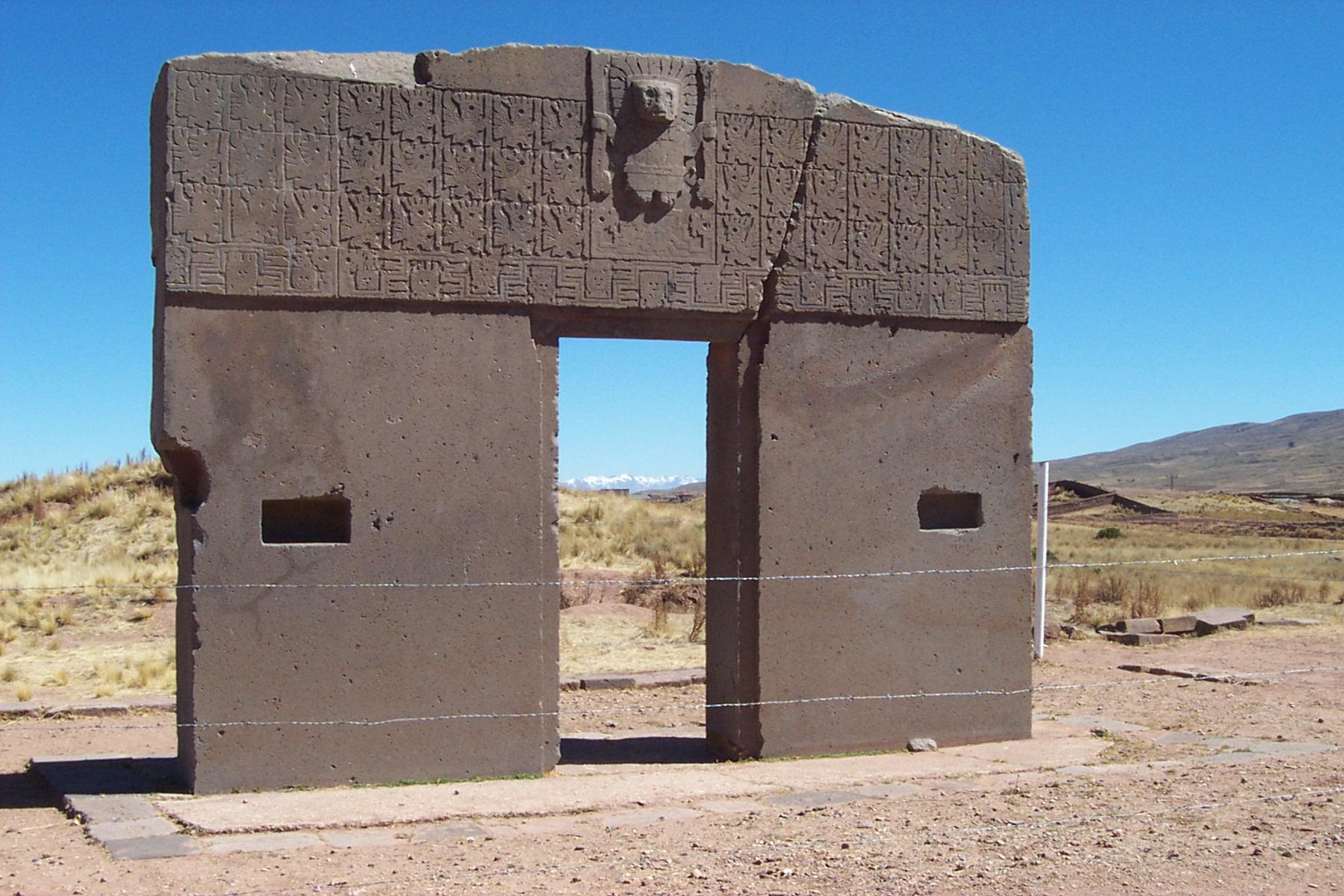
The Gate of the Sun in Tiwanaku, Bolivia

When Inca migrants first arrived at the traditional lands of the Aymara people, some Aymara people and other ethnic groups were living side by side in the village of Acamaca. Acamaca, located to the north of Lake Titicaca, would grow to be the site of the later Kingdom of Cusco, the capital of the Inca Empire and the current day city of Cusco. The Inca arrived not as an army but as migrants searching for agricultural land.

The Aymara people of the Altiplano, the Titicaca basin, and the ancient city of Tiwanaku to the south of Lake Titicaca, also encountered the Inca civilisation prior to the rise of the Inca Empire. One of the Inca origin stories tells of Manco Capac and Mama Occlo being brought up from the waters of Lake Titicaca by the Sun God to create an Inca dynasty.

The rulers of the Kingdom of Cusco were obligated to travel regularly to the Isla del Sol (Sun Island), a rocky island in the southern part of Lake Titicaca, for ritual worship of the Sun God. Charles Stanish writes:

Throughout their short reigns, Inca emperors were obligated to make a long pilgrimage to the Island of the Sun and the Island of the Moon to the ruined but ritually powerful city of Tiwanaku, sought to have some of their sons and daughters conceived and born in the lake area (and) offered precious objects to the cold waters.

In 1438, Aymara warriors were, be it as mercenaries, volunteers or conscripts, present in the army of the Inca ruler, Pachacuti in the defense of Cusco during the Chanka–Inca War.

==== Inca empire ====
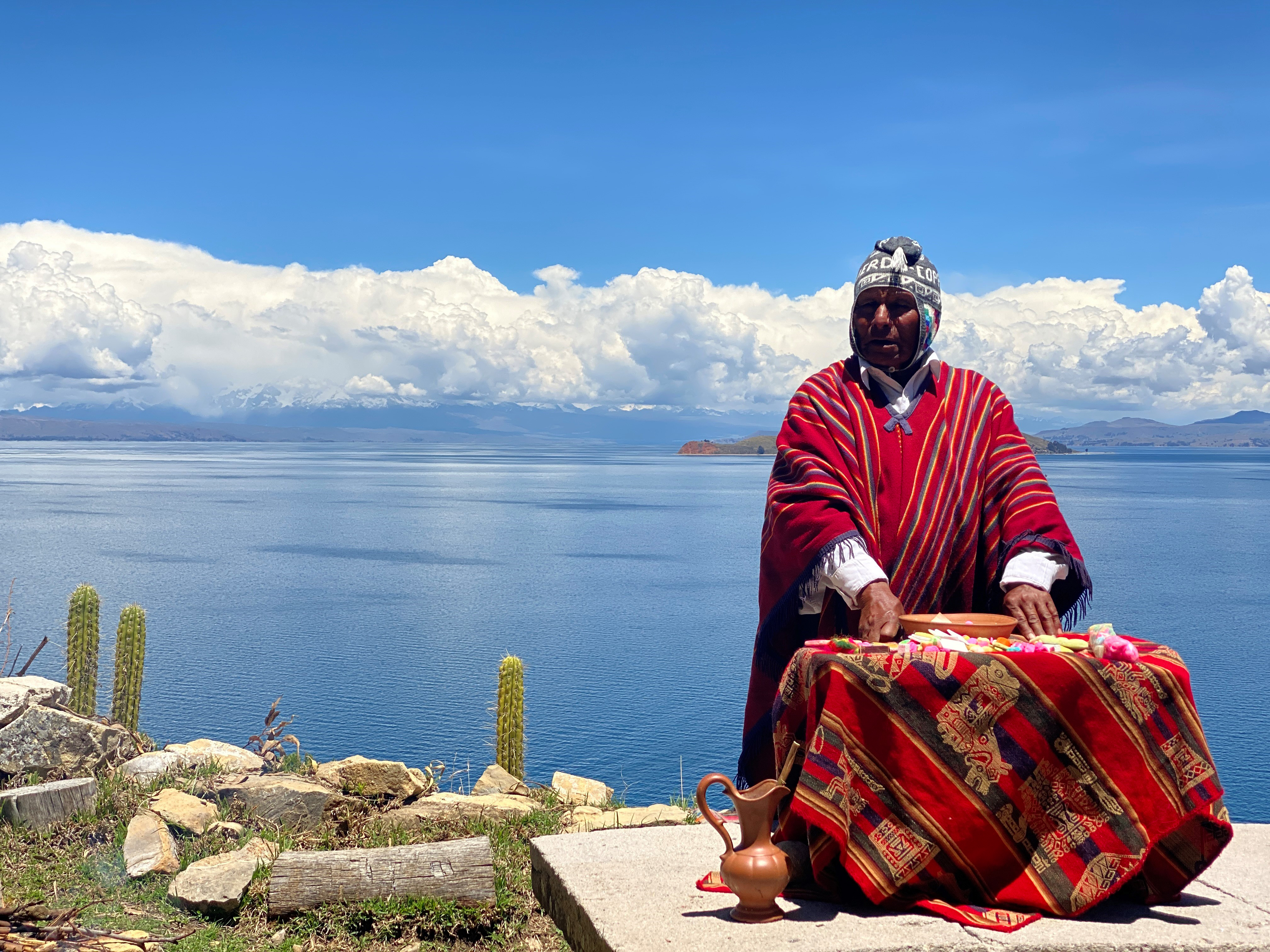
A Yatiri, a traditional Aymara medical practitioner and community healer performing a ritual near Lake Titicaca in Bolivia

The date of Inca conquest of the Altiplano is uncertain beyond that, it began later than 1438 and was well completed by 1500.

The often quoted Spanish conquistador and chronicler, Pedro Cieza de León travelled through the Altiplano in 1548. He gives the ruler, Viracocha Inca (c. 1410–1438) as the first to expand Inca territory south from the Kingdom of Cusco but that he was unsuccessful in securing the area. Again, de León records Viracocha's successor, Pachacuti (c. 1418–1471) as the leader who succeeded in bringing the area under Inca control, effected by his son, Yupanqui (c. 1471–1493). This chronology has been used widely by historians and archeologists in this field following the seminal work of John Howland Rowe.

However, more recent historians warn that the chronology of the spread of the Inca empire from Cusco, south to the Altiplano, may be more complex. For example, the names of Incan leaders are variable and may have been used across generations; there were revolts amongst the elite of the Inca Kingdom of Cusco itself; and the history given by the Inca to the Spanish chroniclers was given as part mythology. Furthermore, the dating of the conquest of the Incas by the finding of certain ceramics in archeological strata is, in this area, unreliable.

==== Inca subjugation of the Aymara ====
Rather than one ethnically homogenous group, the Aymara consisted of sometimes warring clans of differing dialects, traditions and geographic distribution. Among them were the Huamallas, Hatuncollas, Chuquitos and Azángaros, and the Lupaqa and Colla. Their loyalty remained to their village and their local chiefs.

Unlike the many groups of Indigenous peoples who lost every vestige of their cultures under Inca rule, the Aymara civilisation survived, at least partially. The Aymara insurrections were violent but also organised and persistent (one of twelve years duration). In the end, though, the Aymara were unsuccessful in throwing off the Inca. The outcome was harsh retribution in the form of executions or exile.

In addition to this direct punishment, the Aymara were increasingly subjugated by the building of civil, military, agricultural and religious infrastructure through their lands, removal of their sons to Cusco for education, taxation in the form of relinquishing sacred objects to the Inca. The Aymara were also required to give labour and military service to the Inca.

Moreover, groups of Aymara were removed from their village to work in other parts of the Empire, the number of Aymara living in Cusco itself was limited and colonists from elsewhere in the Empire were settled in the region.

=== Spanish colonial era ===
==== Conquistadors ====
Christopher Colombus set sail from Castile, Spain, in August 1492 to find a western sea passage to the spice rich East Indies. In 1513, Vasco Núñez de Balboa crossed the Isthmus of Panama into the Pacific Ocean. Twenty-nine years later, on 16 November 1532, the explorer and conquistador Francisco Pizarro travelled south from La Isla Gorgona lured by stories of silver, gold and precious gems. On reaching Cajamarca, a town about 2000 km north of Cusco, Pizarro met and captured Atahualpa. Atahualpa, known for his tyrannical rule, was executed in July 1533.

Pizarro reached Cusco by 1534. Some Native groups saw the Spaniards as liberators and lent support to Pizarro. Pizarro also secured a lineage of Inca puppet rulers, including Manco Inca Yupanqui. Manco Inca Yupanqui was ill treated by Pizarro's men. He escaped then returned with tens of thousands warriors, forcing Cusco into siege. After ten months, and the arrival of Spanish reinforcements, Manco Inca Yupanqui withdrew.

Having secured Cusco, Pizarro continued south with the resources, wealth and infrastructure of the Inca and Native labour. He benefited from the lack of cohesion between the Altiplano ethnic groups. In 1542, Spain created the Viceroyalty of Peru.

==== Encomenderos ====
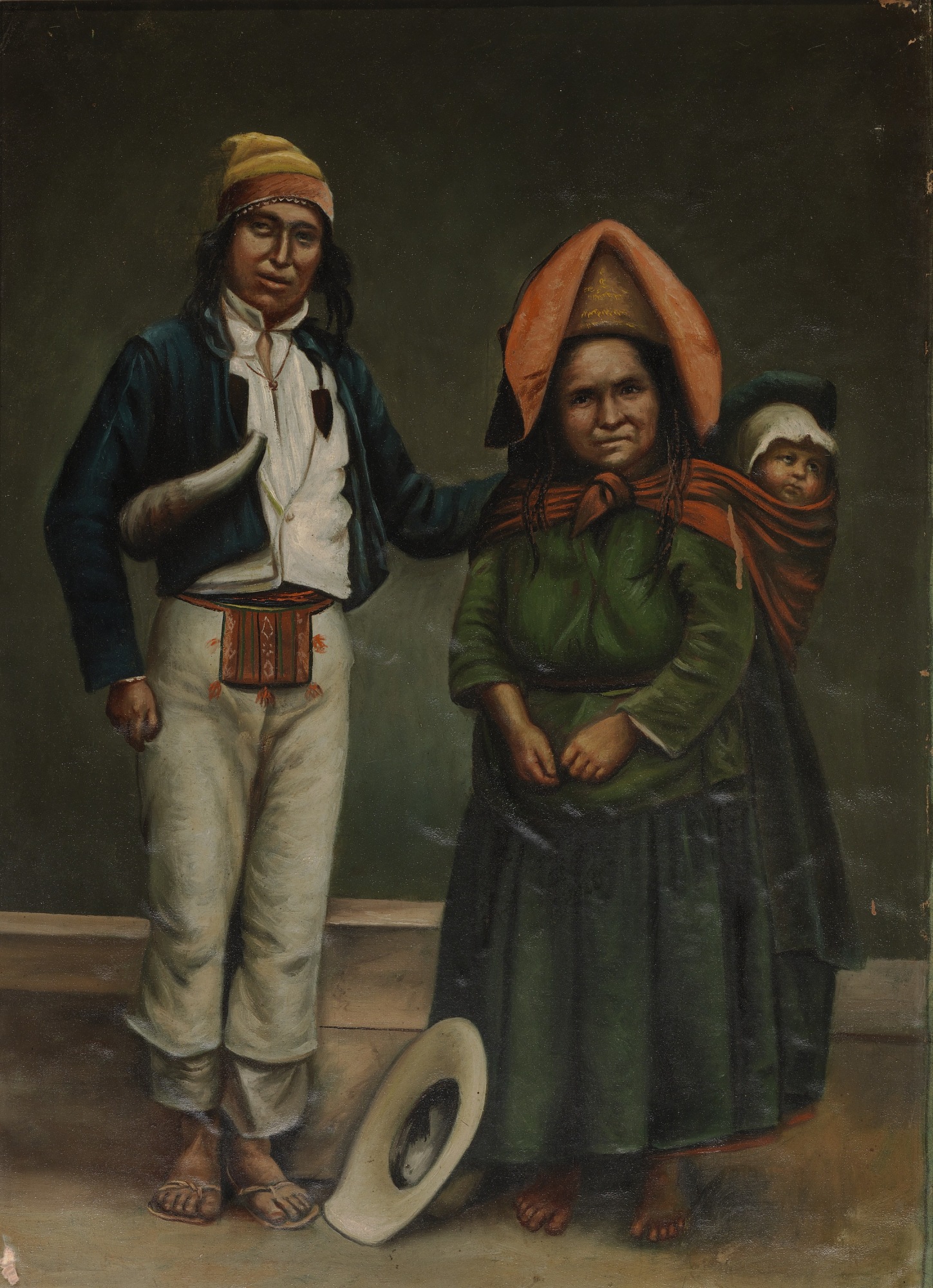
Aymara people painting, 1890

In the new viceroyalty, explorers, conquistadors, governors and generals were given encomiendas. These grants from Spain gave the encomenderos the right to demand taxes and labour from the Indigenous people in return for military protection and religious instruction. They were a sign of an elite status in society.

Indigenous men between the ages of 18 and 50 were taxed in money and labour. Tax was collected by the village chiefs. One-sixth of taxable men were already assigned to encomenderos who collected the taxes. Twenty percent of the monies went to the crown. In practice, the responsibilities of the encomiendas were applied partially or not at all, while the taxes were.

In 1870, David Forbes, Mineralogist and voyager, wrote to the Ethnological Society of London, of his observations in Bolivia and Peru:

Whatever may have been the condition of the Aymaras under the Incas, it became infinitely worse after the Spanish conquest; it is all but impossible to convey in words a true picture of the barbarous treatment which they, as well as the neighbouring Indian tribes, experienced at the hands of the Spaniards. Treated infinitely worse than slaves, they were torn from their homes and families to be driven like cattle either to the Coca plantations and Gold washings in the Yungas, or hot unhealthy valleys to the east of the high Andes (where they rapidly fell victims to a climate altogether unsuited to their constitution), or to the Silver mines of Potosí, Chayanta, Oruro (where from forced labour, ill-treatment, and insufficient food, they succumbed equally fast, only to be replaced by fresh supplies similarly obtained).

==== New Laws ====
In 1542, the Dominican friar, Bartolomé de las Casas published his testimony of the abuse of the Aymara by the Spanish in his book, A Brief Account of the Destruction of the Indians. On 20 November 1542, in response to criticism, King Charles I of Spain issued the New Laws (Ordenanzas de Barcelona or Leyes Nuevas).

Indigenous people could no longer be slaves. They could not be sent to the mines without cause. Clergy and Civil servants had to give up their encomiendas to the crown. New grants could not be given and importantly, an encomienda could not be an inheritable property.

Among the approximate 500 encomiendas in the viceroyalty of Peru, there were cases of corruption and circumvention of the new laws. There were skirmishes between Royalist soldiers and groups of encomenderos, culminating in the death of many encomenderos in an insurrection led by Gonzalo Pizarro in 1548.

The new laws started to streamline the encomienda system but Aymara numbers continued to fall. Furthermore, the Indigenous labour force was redistributed causing forced and permanent displacement to cities, factories, or mines. For example, in 1573, the Indigenous population of labourers at the Potosí silver mines was 11,000. By 1673, the same population numbered 1,600.

==== Viceroy Francisco de Toledo ====
In 1569, Francisco de Toledo was appointed fifth viceroy of Peru by Philip II of Spain. Toledo served in this role until 1581. He made Lima the administrative capital of the viceroyalty. He was tasked with creating a successful system of governance throughout the viceroyalty. To this end, Toledo created provinces and aligned the population with them into new, concentrated settlements called "reductions" (reducciones de indios). This involved forced resettlement which caused disruption to aspects of life of the Indigenous people such as importance of the extended family clan (ayllu), authority of the clan and regional chiefs (curacas), land ownership, farming, language, rituals and sacred life (for example, sacred places known as huacas).

==== Evangelisation ====
Toledo was also asked to consider the legitimacy of the Spanish conquest. Toledo concluded that the conquistadors were no more legitimate in their rule than the Inca. However, the viceroyalty of Peru was legitimate on the basis of the Spanish bringing Catholic Christianity to the Indigenous people.

Toledo instructed the secular clergy and the leaders of the monastic orders to begin the evangelisation of the viceroyalty. This was not an easy task due to a lack of clergy, lack of experience of the monastic orders in evangelising and the language barrier between the Spanish and the Indigenous groups who spoke, for the most part, dialects of Aymaran or Quechuan.

Some efforts were made to provide simple lexicons for religious teaching. However, this was difficult because the Aymara language had no orthography and Aymara phonetics did not compare well with those of the Spanish language. Ludovico Bertonio was an Italian Jesuit missionary who, in 1603, wrote about the Aymara language. On one hand, some clergy tried to adapt notable aspects of the Aymara people's spiritual life, for example, rituals or seasons of the year, with the liturgy and the liturgical calendar. On the other hand, such efforts were shunned by those who saw the Aymara spiritual life as one of idolatry and objected to the use of alcohol or coca in rituals.

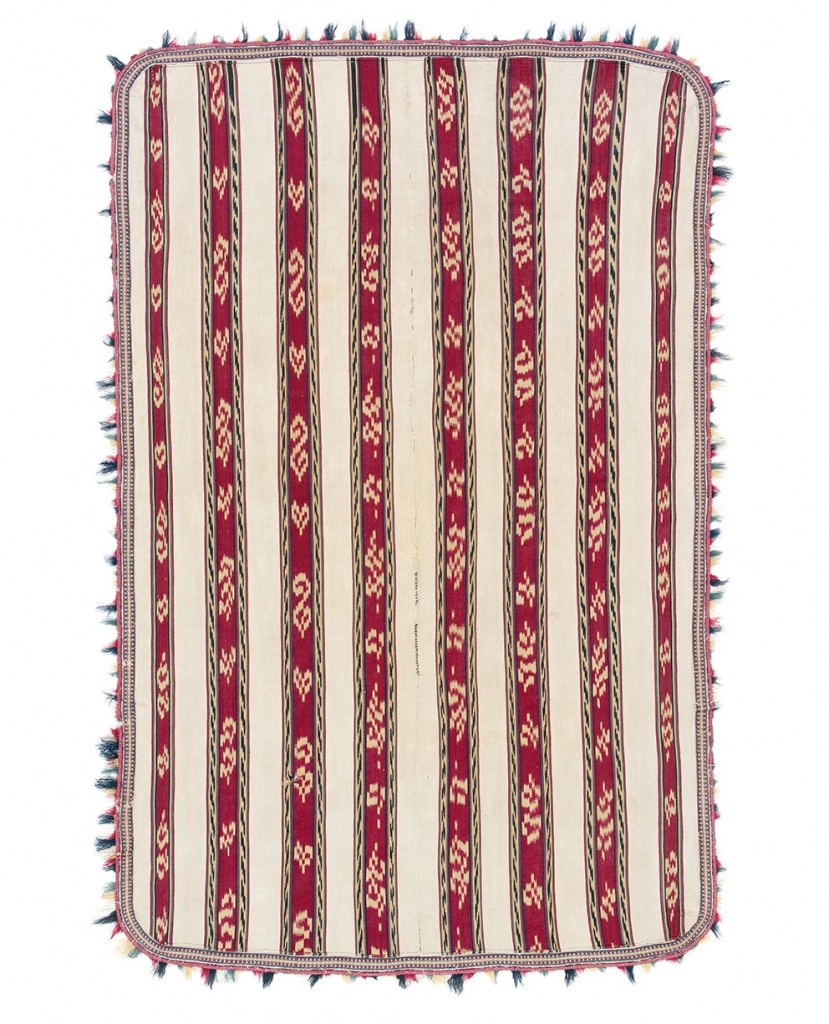
Aymara poncho, 17th or 18th century

==== Aymara rebellion ====
In the Spanish colonial era, the region of Aymara and Quechuan habitation was divided into eleven provinces. They were Canchi, Caranga, Chocarca, Colla, Collagua, Collahuaya, Omasuyo, Lupaca, Quillaca, Urbina, and Picasa. Insurrection in the region occurred in an intermittent, semi-organised manner from as early as 1629 through to the Peruvian war of Independence (1809–1826) when Spanish colonial rule ended. A larger and more persistent insurrection occurred between 1779 and 1781. The Inca descendant, Túpac Amaru, is described as its grand leader. However, historians Julian Steward in 1946 and Steve Stern in 1987 warn that the history of this era is more complex then the romantic version involving Amaru with intricate and various associations between ethnic groups.

===== Annexation by Chile =====
The War of the Pacific (1879 – 1883) or the nitrate war, was a conflict between Chile and an alliance of Bolivia and Peru. It was precipitated by a northward incursion by Chile to control sources of guano in the Litoral province of Bolivia and the Tarapacá province of Peru. It resulted in Aymara people being politically separated between the three nations.

The border between Peru and Bolivia transects Lake Titicaca. Chile denied Bolivia of its only seaport at Arica.

The Aymara people left living in Chile once again had most aspects of their lives torn asunder. In this case, it was Chilean military clergy who began the "chilenisation" of the Aymara. The emphasis of this program was indoctrination of the ideology of Chilean nationalism.

== Distribution ==
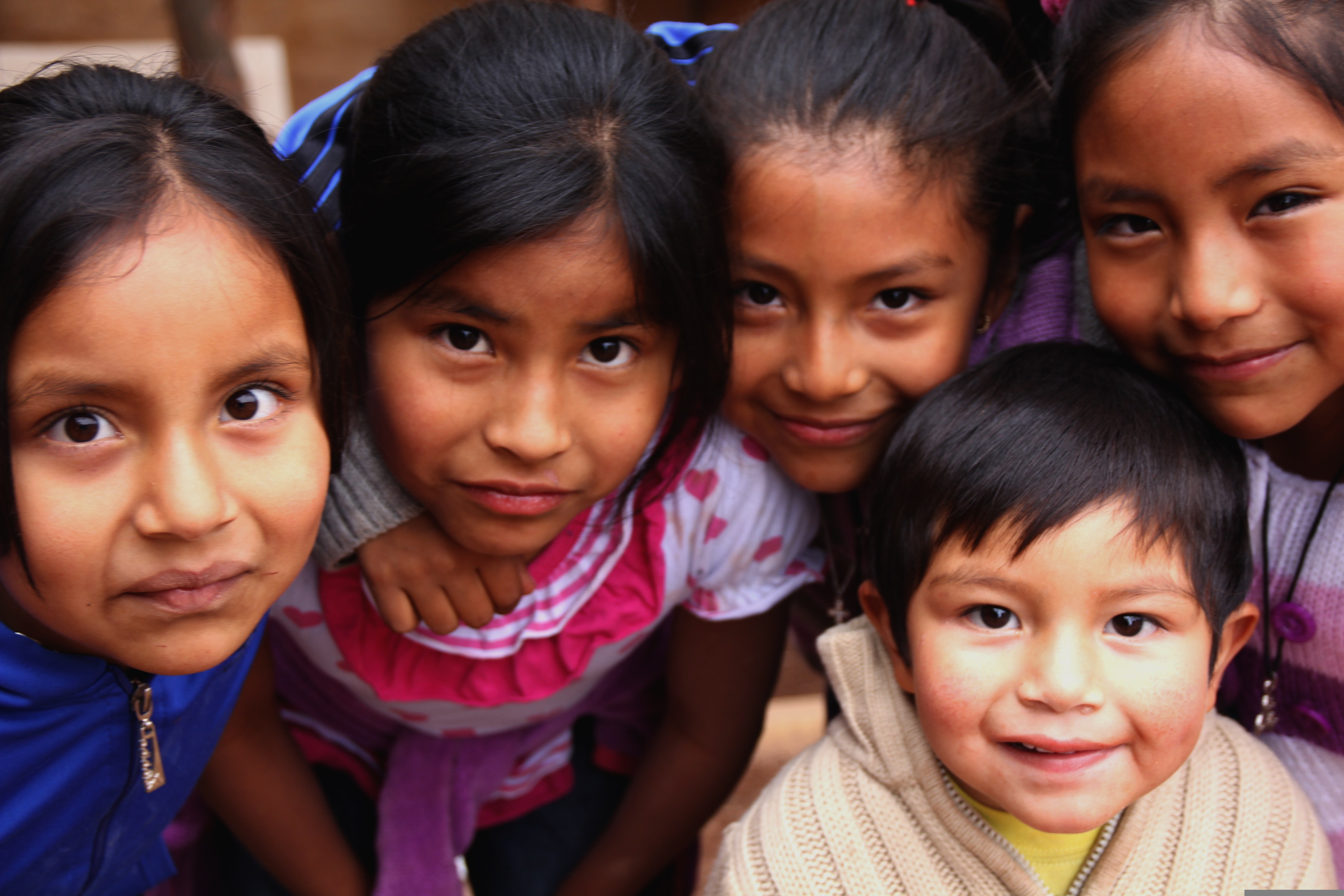
Aymara children from Atacama, Chile.

The total number of Aymara people is quoted at 1,847,000. Approximately 30% live in Peru and 60% in Bolivia. The rest are divided between Chile (6%) and Argentina (0.2%). Most self-identify as Christian. In Peru, Aymara language is one of the three official languages in the country, along with Spanish and Quechua. It is spoken by 1.6% of the population.

The Aymara people in Bolivia are commonly found in the region known as the Andean Region, in the western part of the country. This region comprises the departments of La Paz, Oruro, and Potosí. In Peru, they are found in the regions to the south bordering Bolivia, primarily Puno, Tacna, and Moquegua.

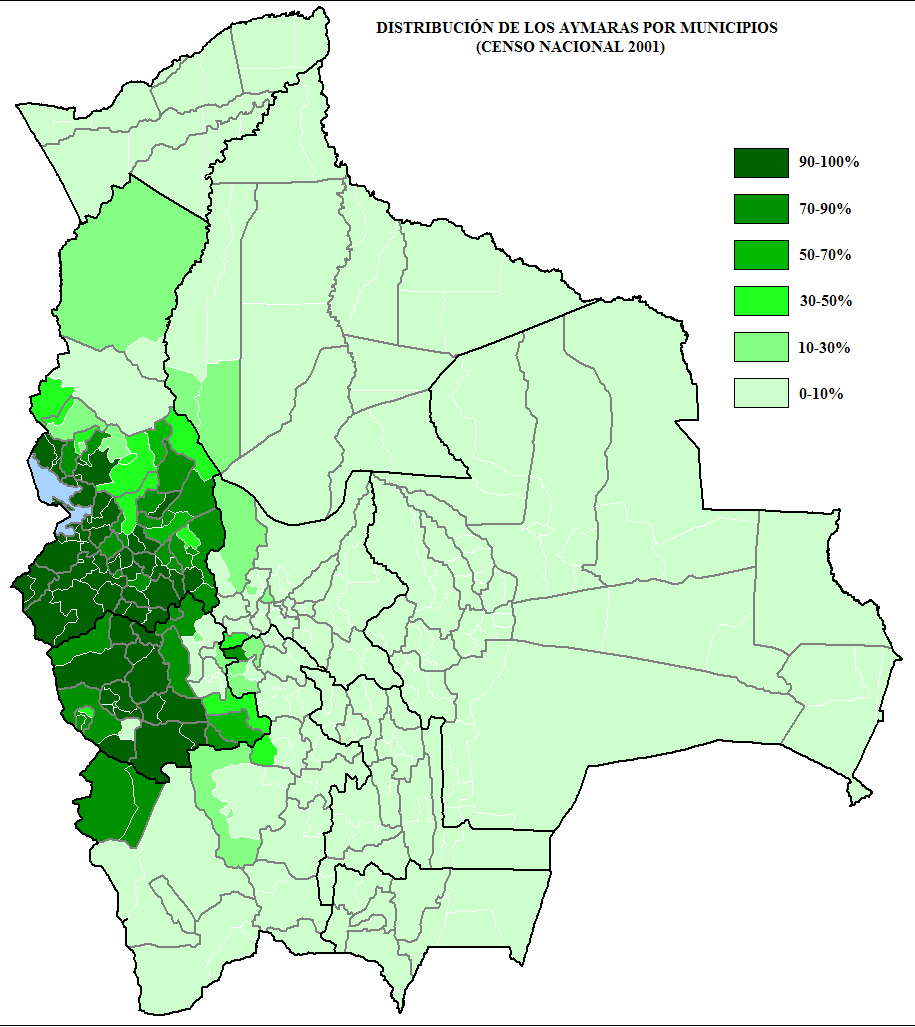
Distribution in Bolivia's provinces (2011)

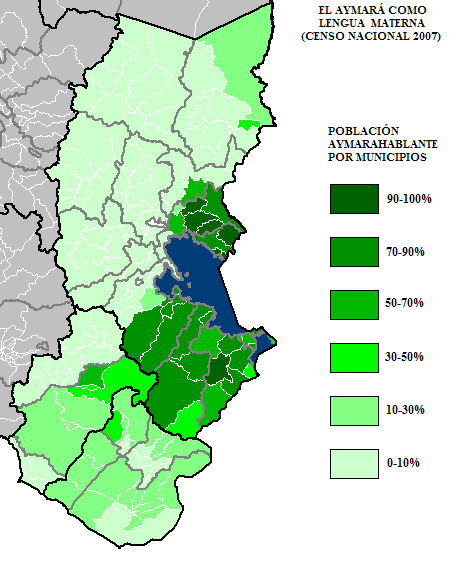
Distribution of Aymara language in Peru (2007)

== Culture ==
=== Flag ===
The Wiphala, flag of the Aymara and Indigenous peoples of the Andes

The Aymara flag is known as the Wiphala. An ancient design associated with the Inca, the Wiphala is an ethnic symbol for the Aymara and has been adopted as a symbol of Indigenous rights. It consists of seven colours patched together in diagonal stripes. The different colours represent geographical regions. The meaning of colours have been adapted to represent different areas of indigenous culture: red (planet earth); orange (society); yellow (strength and morality); green (economy and ecology); blue (supernatural life); and violet (self-determination).

=== Language ===
The Aymara people's language is Aymara. It is spoken from the north of Lake Titicaca to the south of Lake Poopó. Aymara is a third official language in Peru after Spanish and Quechua. It is spoken by 1.6% of the Peruvian population. Aymara has no distant language relative but there are some nearby similar languages. Quechua has some overlap with Aymara brought by contact. There are two closely related languages called Jaqaru and Kawki. A small isolated group of about 1000 people speak these languages in and around the village of Tupe, in Yauyos Province, in the remote highlands southwest of Lima. Other related languages are presumable extinct.

=== Dress and textiles ===
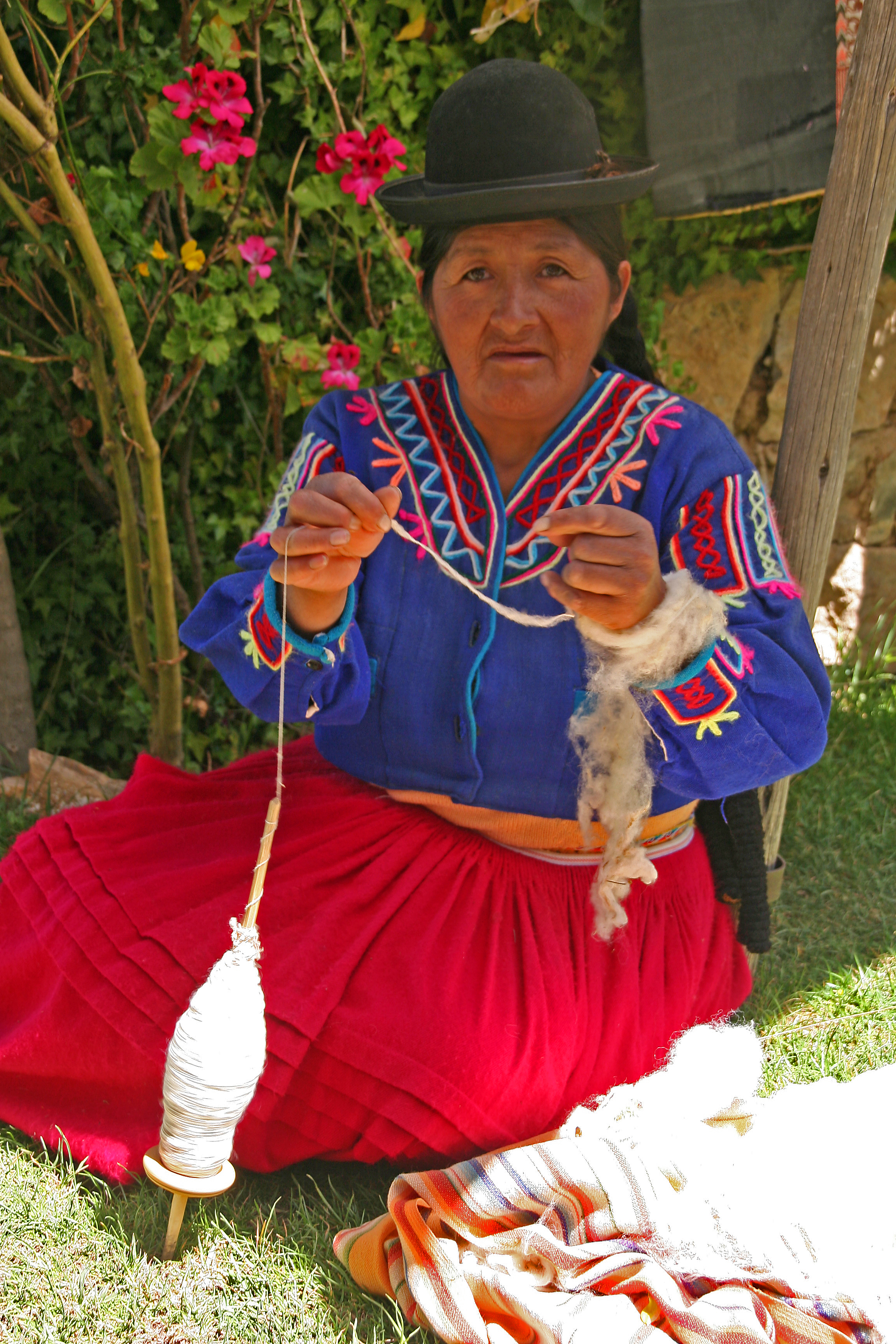
Aymara woman spinning Alpaca wool

Aymara people spin alpaca and llama wool and then colour it with vegetable and mineral dyes. Urine may be used as a mordant (colour fixative). Wools and cotton are woven on a horizontal peg loom by both men and women. There is no broad loom weaving and so, traditional garments such as carrying cloths and ponchos are made by joining two pieces. The colours are vibrant. Patterns are striped or geometrical.

Traditional clothing items include the Chullo, a knitted wool cap with ear flaps and ties; a woven carrying cloth Aguayo carried across the shoulders; a poncho; and a full circle skirt gathered and decorated in horizontal layers (corte).

Development of the Aymara textile industry has led to expositions of luxury alpaca wool garments, silks, lace and delicately embroidered blouses. Another innovation drawing on the Aymara colorful aesthetic is buildings designed in a "Neo-Andean" style which has appeared in El Alto.

Both Quechua and Aymara women in Peru and Bolivia adopted the style of wearing bowler hats in the 1920s. According to legend, a shipment of bowler hats was sent from Europe to Bolivia via Peru for use by Europeans working on railroad construction. They were given to the Indigenous people if they were too small for the construction workers.

=== Food ===
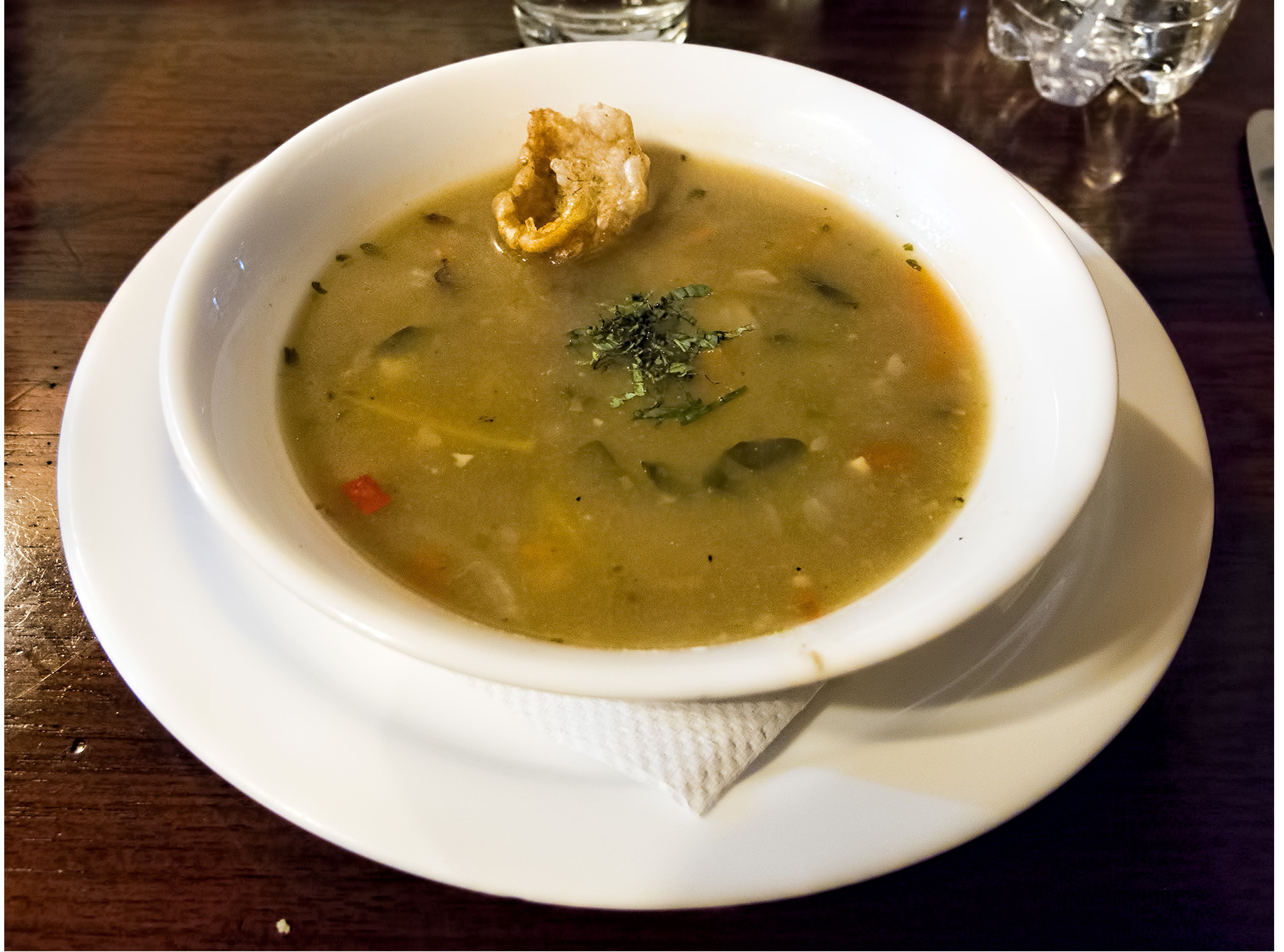
Chairo paceño

Plants available to the traditional Aymara for through subsistence agriculture or trade were wild tomato (Solanum huaylasense); lucuma (Pouteria lucuma), a sweet fruit; a small orange fruit of the nightshade family which grows within a green calyx; qamasa and quinoa (Amaranthaceae) of the amaranth family for their seeds and leaves; purple corn (of the flint maize family); maca (Lepidium meyenii) a ginseng or turnip like vegetable; onion (Trichlora); olluco (Ullucus), a root vegetable that looks like a small potato; Yacón, a root vegetable called ground apple and cherimoya (Annona).

The potato (Solanum tuberosum) originated in the region of the Aymara. Wild species are no longer eaten but are still found. Peru is home to 47% of all wild potato species. Cultivated species are a dietary staple. Potatoes can be stored for many years as Chuño. Potatoes are exposed to freezing temperatures overnight then dried during the day. It provides food security in times of famine. However, it is not of high nutritional value. It is used in a variety of dishes. One traditional dish, common in La Paz, is Chairo. It is a type of stew made with Chuño, meat, carrots, onions, and corn.

==== Coca ====
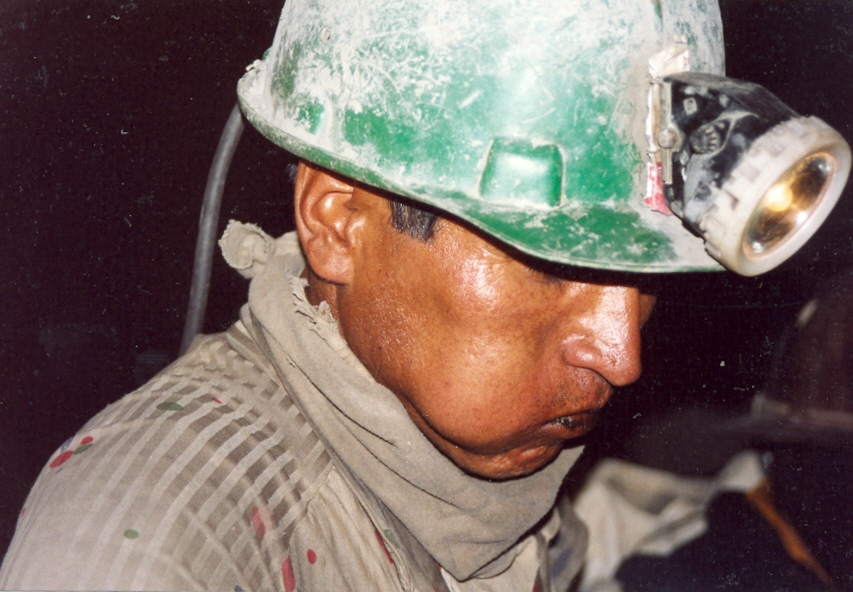
A Bolivian miner chewing coca leaf in Potosí

The Aymara word for tree is khoka from which the word coca is derived. Aymara people have had, throughout their history, traditional, recreational, ritual and medicinal uses for coca. The whole leaves can be chewed, brewed as a tea or sucked with a pinch of wood ash. Medicinally, coca has been used to relieve stomach complaints, including hunger. Whether or not coca ameliorates the symptoms of altitude related illness remains uncertain.

The psychoactive drug, cocaine is just one of the alkaloid substances found in coca plants. One variant grown for its cocaine content is Erythroxylum coca. Other variants of the coca plant contain less potent or non-toxic alkaloids and give only a mild stimulant effect.

== Religion and spirituality ==
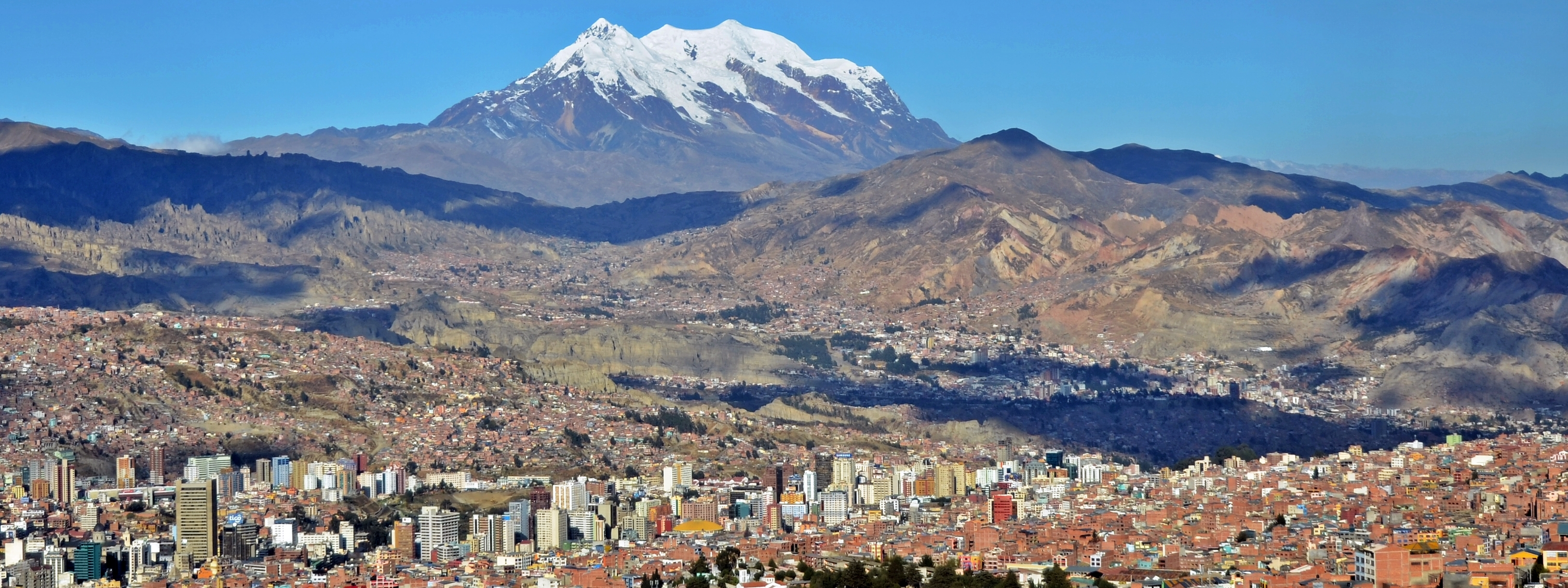
Mount Illimani towering over La Paz. Illimani is considered an apu in Aymara spirituality, a mountain deity and guardian of the city.

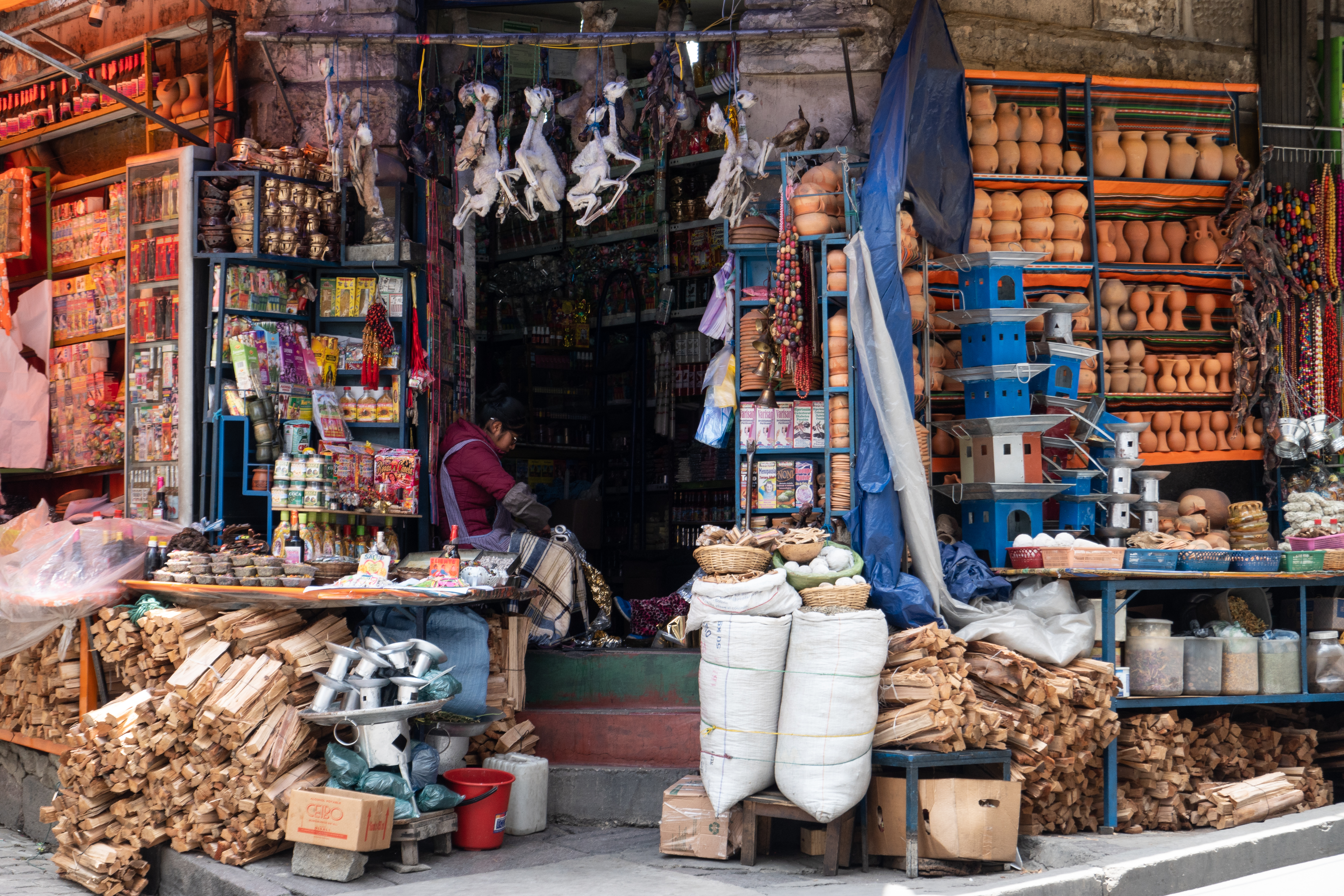
Mummified stillborn llamas displayed at the Witches' Market in La Paz

Aymara religion is a syncretic system of faith, bringing Indigenous spirituality and Catholicism into close proximity. The syncretism is evident in the liturgy of the Aymara lands. Christian feast days which coincide temporally with Aymara spiritual events have associated, or even combined, meaning and ritual.

Aymara Indigenous spirituality (pachakuti) is based on the seasons and key agricultural events. It gives the foundation of the existence of the Aymara and their responsibility to the natural environment. The Aymara concept of time comes from the cycle of natural events such as the seasons, historical events such as the arrival of the Spaniards and mythological concepts such as the time of the sun. When there is a major shift in these, it is transformation (kuti). The deities are regarded in a hierarchical system.

The spirits of the high mountains and altiplano are worshipped as entities which provide for and protect the people. These entities are called Achachilas which might be understood as grandparents, ancestors or gods of the household. The majestic mountains, Illimani, Illampu and Huayna Potosí are three Achachilas deities.

Auki auki are people chosen to represent Achachilas in festivals so the spirits may dance upon the earth. Human figuries of the Achachilas are found at The Witches' Market (calle de las brujes) in La Paz. The items required for ritual offerings are sold at the market. They include coca leaves, incense, stillborn llama, potions, soaps and candles.

The stillborn llama (sullus), mummified by exposure to the cold, dry conditions of the Altiplano, are sold in all sizes from tiny to near fully formed. Their legs are bound and blessings have been given by a priest (yatiri). Stillborn are a frequent occurrence in llamas who can fall pregnant again at two weeks post delivery. The sullus are used as burnt offerings or are buried in the foundations of the house. In Aymara mythology, the Heavenly Llama drinks water from the ocean and urinates it as rain. According to Aymara eschatology, llamas will return to the water springs and lagoons where they come from at the end of all time.

Traditionally, the Aymara dead have been buried in and outside the home, in cairns, in stone dolmens and in cylindrical, upright graves. The chullpa funerial towers were reserved for the elite of society. They varied in size, architecture and the number of burial chambers.

== Political activism ==
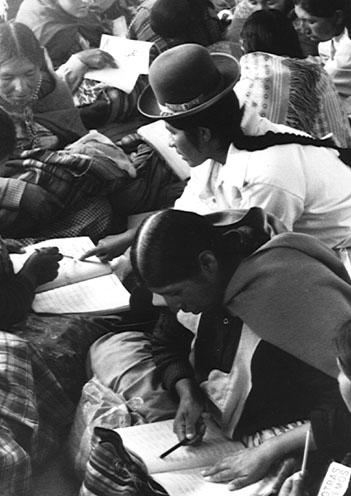
Literacy class in El Alto

There are many challenges faced by the Aymara people. On 23 June 2023, 48 Aymara from the La Paz region were consulted in order to prepare a contribution to the United Nations Climate Change Conference in 2028 in Dubai (COP28). The difficulties recognised included: poverty, racism, limited access to the justice system, lack of informed consent in the health system, lack of culturally appropriate health care, loss of traditional knowledge and environmental damage.

However, responses to these challenges are not all the same. For example, some Aymara families put deeper Spanish language learning over Aymara language skills for their children in order to improve the children's chances of improving their options in the general population.

Furthermore, the nature of response to these challenges delineates along national lines.

=== Bolivian Aymara activism ===
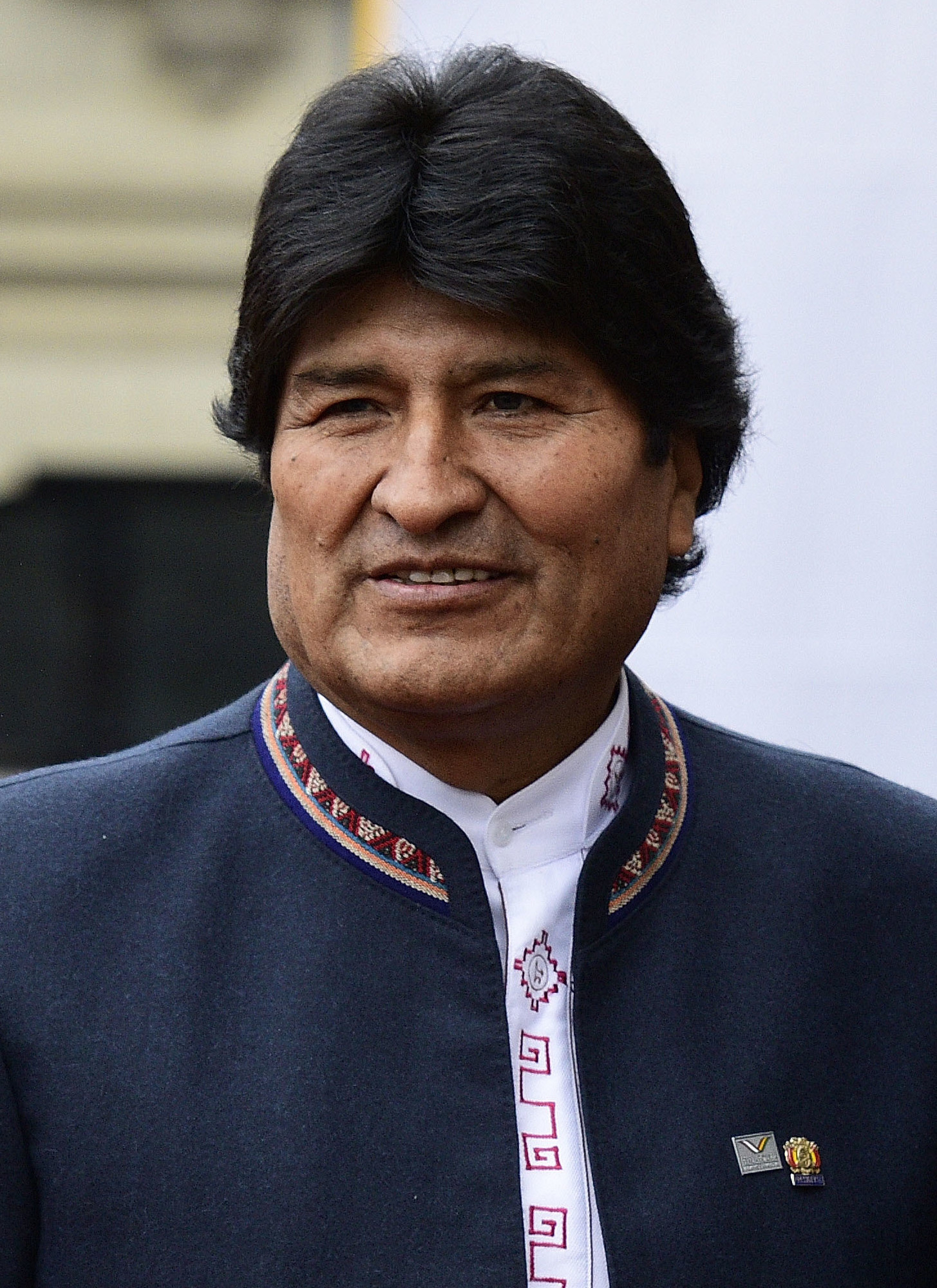
Evo Morales, Bolivia's first president of indigenous descent

In the 1960s, peasant student activists and intellectuals in La Paz, developed a group on the basis of the ideology of Fausto Reinaga (1906–1994). Felipe Quispe (1942–2021) organised the group. He founded the Tupac Katari Guerrilla Army, in 1989. Despite the imprisonment of Quispe, the group was involved in violent incidents until 1995.

Quispe was released from prison in 1997. He then reinvigorated the CSUTCB (Confederación sindical única de trabajadores campesinos de Bolivia or Unified Syndical Confederation of Peasant Workers of Bolivia) which had first formed in 1979 to represent Aymara people.

Between 2000 and 2005, a succession of protests, such as the Bolivian gas conflict in 2003 and mass protests in 2005, toppled the government of Carlos Mesa.

Along Katarist lines, the Movement Towards Socialism (Movimiento al Socialismo – Instrumento Político por la Soberanía de los Pueblos or MAS) political party evolved to support coca farmers, mine workers and the urban poor. The party, under the leadership of Evo Morales and the concept of a "pre-european colonial utopia" was democratically elected to government in December 2005. It remained the incumbent party until the 2025 Bolivian general election.

== Notable Aymara people ==
- Gregoria Apaza, Revolutionary
- Chuquimamani-Condori, American musician
- Joshua Chuquimia Crampton, American musician
- Jaime Escalante, teacher
- Pato Hoffmann, actor
- Rosa Jalja, ecologist and radio journalist
- Túpac Katari, revolutionary
- Remedios Loza, television presenter and politician
- Freddy Mamani, Bolivian architect
- Evo Morales, 65th President of Bolivia
- Roberto Mamani Mamani, Bolivian contemporary artist
- Rosmery Mollo, reproductive health nurse
- Rosa Palomino, human rights activist
- Bartolina Sisa, revolutionary
- Ramiro Vaca, Bolivian soccer player
- César, Bolivian soccer player
- Diego Cayupil, Chilean soccer player
- Luis Jiménez Cáceres, Chilean politician, conventional constituent of the Chilean Constitutional Convention
- Isabella Mamani, Chilean politician, conventional constituent of the Chilean Constitutional Convention
- Javier García Choque, Chilean politician
- Jaume Cuéllar, Spanish-Bolivian soccer player
- Joselito Vaca, Bolivian soccer player
- Roberto Fernandez, Bolivian soccer player
- Diego Wayar, Bolivian soccer player
- Cecilia Llusco Alaña, Bolivian mountaineer

== See also ==
- Aymara New Year
- Katarismo
- Kimsa Chata
- Wiphala
