= Yampupata Peninsula =

Bolivian peninsula of Lake Titicaca

- Peninsula
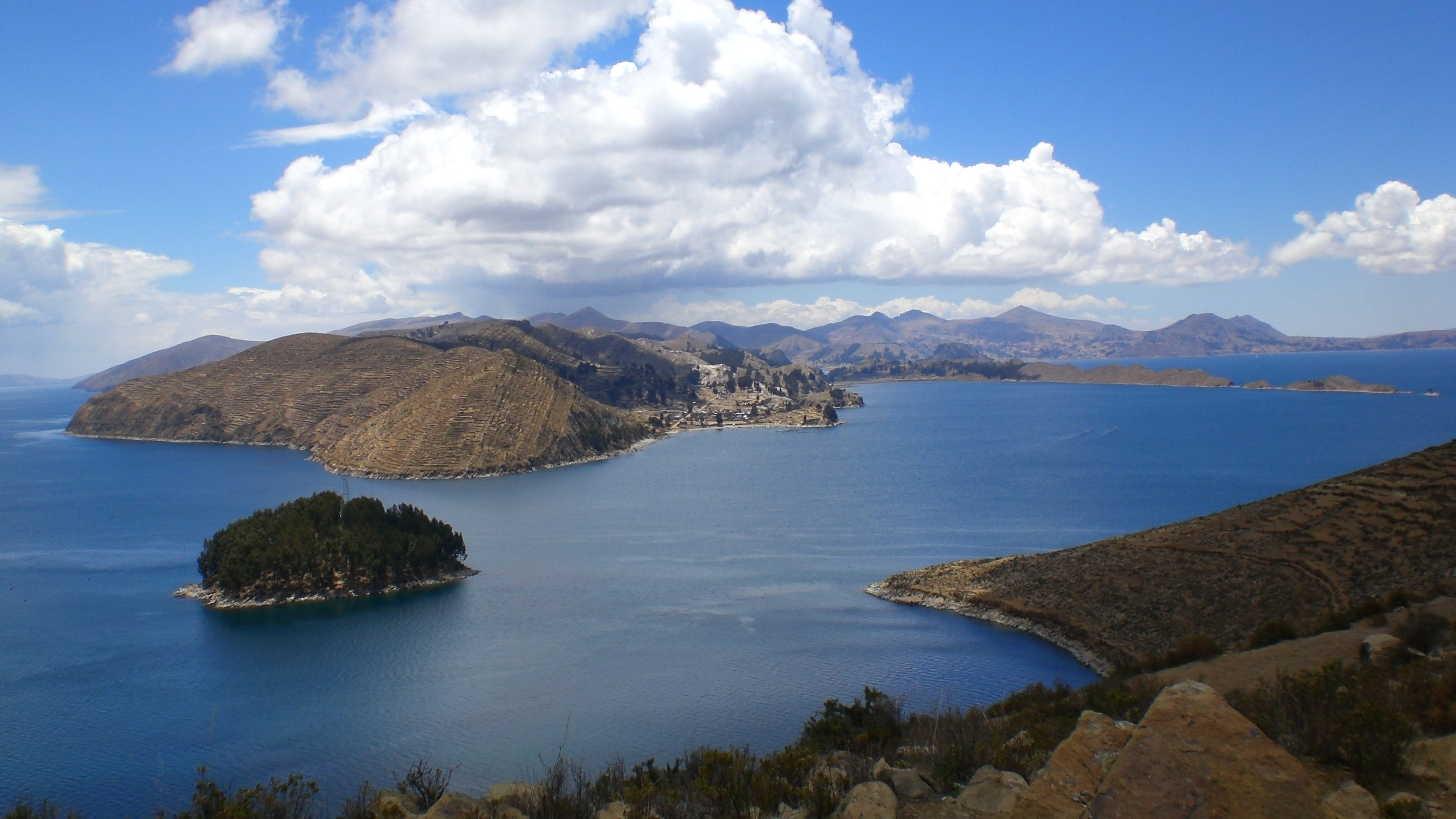
- View from the Isla del Sol to the Yampupata Península in the background and Chelleca island on the left

- Interactive map of Yampupata Peninsula
- Coordinates: 16°04′45″S 69°06′24″W
- Location: La Paz Department, Manco Kapac Province, Copacabana Municipality, Zampaya Canton
- Part of: Lake Titicaca Basin
- Offshore water bodies: Lake Titicaca
- Etymology: Yampupata, Bolivia
- Elevation: 3,835 m (12,582 ft)

Yampupata is a Bolivian peninsula of Lake Titicaca situated in the north-western part of the Copacabana Peninsula in the La Paz Department, Manco Kapac Province, Copacabana Municipality, Zampaya Canton. It is located near the islands Isla de la Luna and Isla del Sol, forming the Strait of Yampupata.

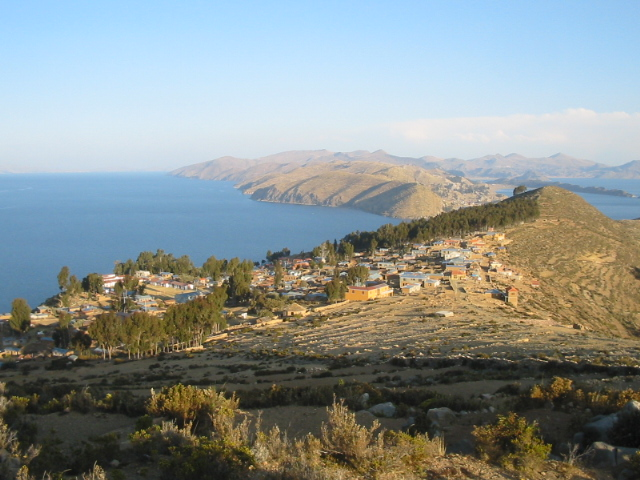
View of the Yampupata Peninsula in the background with Isla del Sol ("sun island") in the foreground

Map showing Isla del Sol, the Strait of Yampupata and Yampupata Peninsula in Lake Titicaca
