= Rosa Palomino =

Aymara indigenous leader (1951–2022)

- Born: 11 March 1951; Camacani, Puno
- Died: 26 March 2022 (aged 71)
- Citizenship: Peruvian
- Occupations: Indigenous rights activist; Aymara radio broadcaster
- Years active: 1970s–2022

Rosa Palomino Chahuareses (11 March 1951 – 26 March 2022) was an Aymara Indigenous leader, journalist, human rights activist, and social leader in Peru. In 2014, the Ministry of Culture presented her with an award for her work in developing community radio for women.

== Biography ==
Palomino was born in the rural community of Camacani, Puno, Peru. In 1985, in the Puno district of Huacullani, she and a group of women started the Aymara language radio show "Q´ana Panqara" (Bright flower). She is considered the first Aymara woman who has worked in radio hosting and production.

From 1988, Palomino produced the radio show Wiñay Panqara (Always flourishing) at Pachamama Radio station, a cultural show that covers Aymara women's issues. Palomino was the director of Peru's Network of Indigenous Media Communicators. In 2019, she was a candidate for Congress of the Republic of Peru with the party Democracia Directa.

Palomino was the president of Abya Yala Union of Aymara Women (UMA, in Spanish).

In 2016, Palomino was recognized by Peru's Ministry of Culture as a renowned Indigenous woman leader. Due to her leadership in Indigenous issues, Palomino was invited to the United Nations and universities across the globe to talk about her community work. Palomino died in 2022.
