= The Witches' Market =

Magical paraphernalia market in La Paz, Bolivia

Coordinates: 16.5000°S 68.1490°W

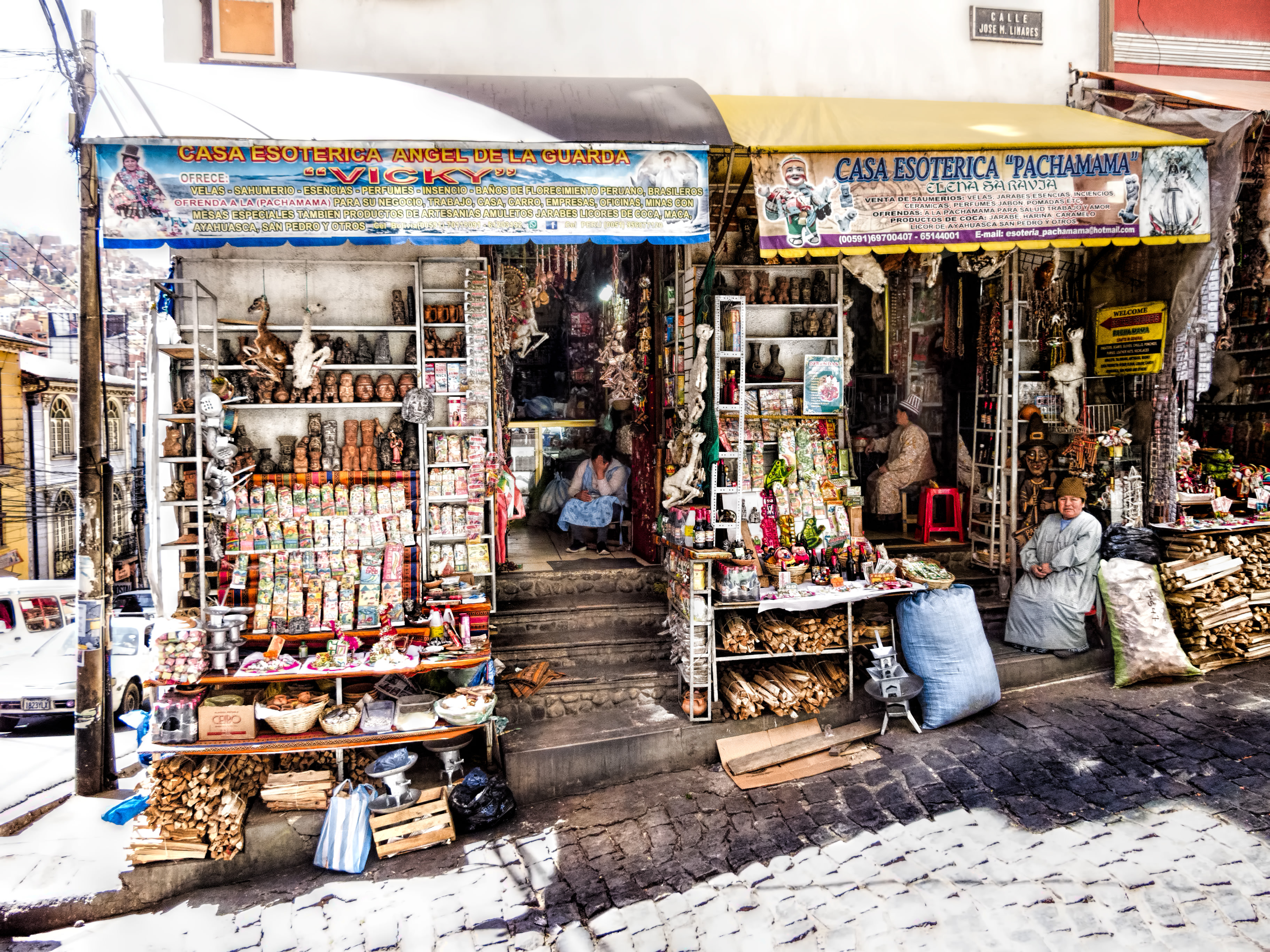
Witches' Market

The Witches' Market, also known as El Mercado de las Brujas and La Hechiceria, is a popular tourist attraction located in Cerro Cumbre, a mountain clearing in La Paz, Bolivia. It is located in the street of Linares, El Rosario neighborhood, but also extends to the streets of Jiménez, Santa Cruz and Illampu. The market was named as a way to be recognizable for foreigners, due the high amount of visitors. In 2019, the market was named Intangible Cultural Heritage from La Paz.

Most part of the products are sold by Aymara women, known as chifreras. The market is run by local witch doctors known as yatiri, who sell potions, dried frogs, medicinal plants like retama, and armadillos used in Bolivian rituals. They also work with fortune-telling, love magic and curses. The yatiri can be easily identified by their black hats and coca pouches containing amulets, talismans and powders that promise luck, beauty and fertility. Most famous of all the items sold in The Witches' Market are the dried llama fetuses, called "sullus". These llama fetuses are buried under the foundations of many Bolivian houses as a sacred offering to the goddess Pachamama. Pachamama rituals usually occur in October, the most busy month in the Witches Market. According to the locals, around 60% of sales happens in this month. Another month that is important to the market is February, during the Carnival. Most of the rituals have been adapted to an urban background due to colonialism in Bolivia.
