= Luis Jiménez Cáceres =

Chilean constituent

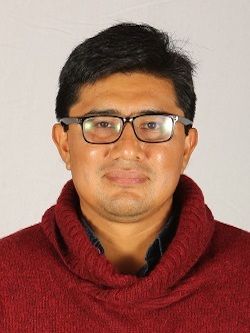

Member of the Constitutional Convention
- In office 4 July 2021 – 4 July 2022
- Constituency: Reserved Seat

Personal details
- Born: 10 September 1984 (age 42) Arica, Chile
- Education: University of Chile (LL.B)
- Occupation: Constituent
- Profession: Lawyer

Luis Alberto Jiménez Cáceres (born 10 September 1983, Arica, Chile) is a Chilean lawyer and politician of Aymara origin.

In May 2021, he was elected as one of the two representatives of the Aymara people to the Constitutional Convention of Chile.

== Biography ==
Jiménez Cáceres was born on 10 September 1983 in Arica. He is the son of Emilio Jiménez Mamani and Sara Gladys Cáceres Coñajagua.

He completed his secondary education at Liceo A-1 Octavio Palma Pérez in Arica. He later obtained a law degree from the University of Chile and completed a postgraduate specialization in Human Rights of Indigenous Peoples and Environmental Law. He has practiced law both in Santiago and in Arica.

== Political career ==
Jiménez Cáceres belongs to the indigenous communities of Guallatire (Arica y Parinacota Region) and Chiapa (Tarapacá Region). He has worked as an adviser to various Indigenous communities, particularly in matters related to extractive projects and environmental impact.

In the elections held on 15 and 16 May 2021, he ran for a reserved Indigenous seat representing the Aymara people (covering the regions of Arica y Parinacota, Tarapacá, and Antofagasta). He obtained 2,318 votes, corresponding to 12.05% of the valid votes cast.

=== Constitutional Convention ===
Within the Constitutional Convention, Jiménez Cáceres supported the drafting of an ecological and plurinational constitution, advocating for regional and Indigenous autonomies, a social and democratic state based on rights, and the recognition of Indigenous peoples’ pre-existence and self-determination. His priorities also included the protection of Indigenous women’s rights and the constitutional recognition of nature and Pachamama within a plurinational state framework.

He served on the Convention’s Provisional Rules Commission. After the approval of the Convention’s regulations in October 2021, he joined the Thematic Commission on Justice System, Autonomous Oversight Bodies, and Constitutional Reform, as well as the Commission on Indigenous Peoples’ Rights and Plurinationality.

In the final stage of the Convention, he became a member of the Harmonization Commission.

On 2 June 2022, Jiménez Cáceres assumed the position of Deputy Vice President of the Constitutional Convention, replacing Lidia González, who resigned from the post on 26 May 2022.
