= Diego Cayupil =

Chilean footballer (born 1998)

Personal information
- Full name: Diego Eduardo Cayupil Lipán
- Date of birth: 5 March 1998 (age 28)
- Place of birth: Nueva Imperial, Chile
- Height: 1.78 m (5 ft 10 in)
- Position: Left-back

Team information
- Current team: Iberia
- Number: 4

Youth career
- Colo-Colo
- Deportes Temuco

Senior career*
Years	Team	Apps	(Gls)
2018–2021	Deportes Temuco	9	(0)
2020–2021	→ Deportes Recoleta (loan)	13	(0)
2022–	Iberia	0	(0)
- * Club domestic league appearances and goals as of 16 May 2022

Diego Eduardo Cayupil Lipán (born 5 March 1998) is a Chilean footballer who plays for Deportes Iberia.

== Career ==
Cayupil was with Colo-Colo youth system for 5 years until he moved to Deportes Temuco. In 2022, he joined Deportes Iberia in the Segunda División Profesional.

At international level, in 2018 he was called up to the first microcycle by the coach Reinaldo Rueda of the Chile senior team.

== Personal life ==
Cayupil Lipán is of Mapuche descent.
