= Roberto Mamani Mamani =

Bolivian painter (born 1962)

Mamani Mamani
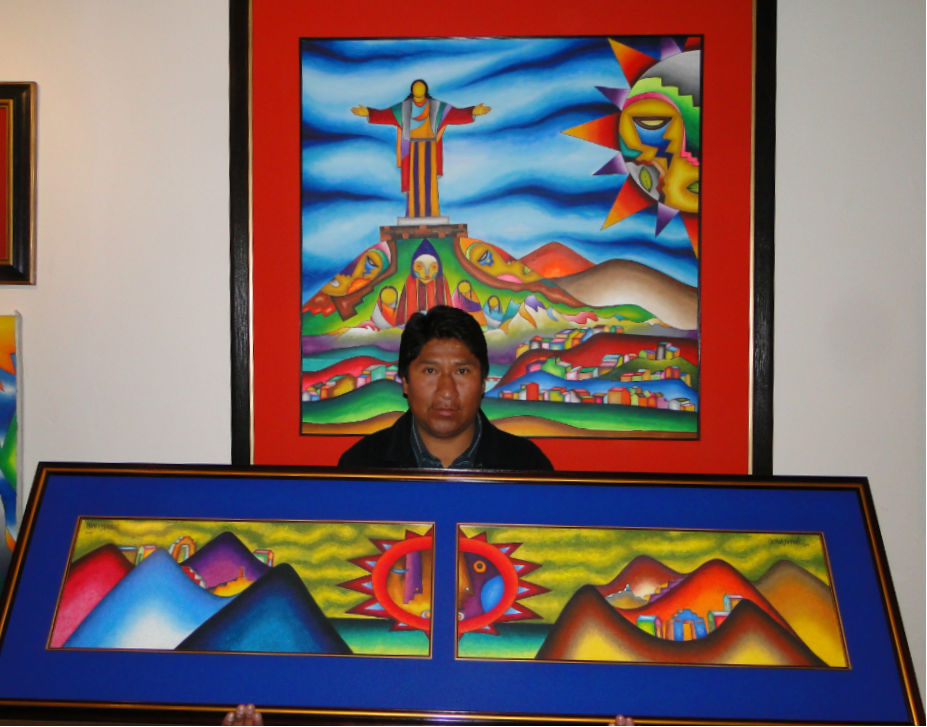
- Roberto Mamani Mamani in one of his galleries in La Paz, Bolivia.
- Born: Roberto Aguilar Quisbert; 6 December 1962; Cochabamba, Cochabamba, Bolivia
- Known for: Painting, Drawing, Photography, Sculpture

Roberto Aguilar Quisbert (born 6 December 1962), better known as Roberto Mamani Mamani, is a Bolivian artist. Roberto Mamani Mamani is a self-taught, first-generation indigenous artist from Bolivia, who also goes by the name Roberto Aguilar Quisbert. The media Mamani Mamani works with are drawing and painting. Robert's art is driven by the inspiration of his culture and traditions, resulting in his work to become very colorful in order to mimic traditional colorful clothing that is worn in his culture.

He is part of two Southern American Indigenous groups, the Quechua and the Aymara. It was forbidden for Roberto's parents to marry due to the tribe they belonged to, therefore they ran away from Tiahuanacu to Cochapampa-land where Robert and his sister grow up. Due to relocation and different customs it was hard for Robert not to notice that they were different to the community they lived in. Owing to the different tribal backgrounds his work is significant in its use of Aymara indigenous tradition and symbols.

== Education ==
Roberto was the first in his family to graduate from high school. Later, he continued his education at Universidad Mayor de San Andrés de La Paz, studying law. However, his love for art and desire for self-discovery pushed him to become a painter. With his career in art on the rise, Roberto took inspiration from traditional indigenous clothing his mother would wear.

Mamani Mamani began to create art, without "proper/ formal training". Roberto experimented with paintings with ashes, clay, stones and other inexpensive materials from his surroundings. Roberto art takes more inspiration from Aymara tribe. Also known as Andean. Heavily influenced by Aymara beliefs and culture, along with his own world views and experiences, Roberto created his own genre of art, naming it "Andean Universe".

His art work mostly consisted of painting, Mamani Mamani's paintings draw upon his Aymara heritage, and include colorfully stylized images of indigenous mothers, condors, suns, and moons, among other themes. Mamani Mamani uses strong vibrant colors similar to the colors featured in the traditional handmade weavings that are widely used by the indigenous people of the Bolivian Altiplano. His use of indigenous symbols is especially significant in the South American context where indigenous cultures have been viewed as inferior to European culture.

== Artwork ==
=== Murals ===
In 2016, he made murals at the walls of the Wiphala social housing complex, located in El Alto.

This is a mural project that consists of seven blocks and twelve-stories high making it the second largest mural in this country. This project is also important because it is the first time in history that the state government has become involved with their people's living conditions. These apartments were created to help people's living conditions in this city. These apartments are exclusively for low income families, freshly married couples, and students. These renovated apartments are sold at half market-price value when compared to nearby housing. This project took approximately five months to complete.

=== Fashion trade ===
Mamani Mamani has also partnered up with the Embassy of the PlurinationalState of Bolivia to make more substantial trade. Involving the global fashion exchange and Vogue magazine in April 2019. This resulted in recruitment of Bolivia designers to collaborate with the fashion industry to promote this fair trade.

=== Art programs ===
Georgina Javor partnered with Roberto and others. To create art programs through D.C., this program include workshops for young children to creating works inspired by Ecuador, Bolivia and Peru art. The goal of this program was to teach young artists and musicians about the Aymara, Quechuan, and other indigenous culture. The craftsmanship shown to these children holds a lot of symbolism, color and tradition from these communities. This project has resulted in leading to 60 exhibitions throughout the state.

Thought this program twenty-five of Roberto's works have been curated and Mamani is seen as a cultural value to this community. Since this project Roberto has also showcased in exhibitions with lesser-known artists.

Roberto has also collaborated with University of Philadelphia in 2021. Under the Latin American Center and Latin studies, he creating a mural featuring indigenous people, animals and landscape of the area. The university collaborated with nearby programs, resulting in Roberto attending a few events based around the artists.

== Exhibitions, residencies, artist talks and events ==
His art has been exhibited around the world, including shows in Washington, D.C., Tokyo, Munich, China, Singapore, and London.

Mural Arts Philadelphia Welcome Event, September 1, 2023, Mural Arts Philadelphia

Community Paint Day, September 2, 2023, Philadelphia Animal Specialty and Emergency

Artist Talk, September 8, 2021, Center for Latin American and Latinx Studies

Mural Dedication, September 28, 2012, Philadelphia Animal Specialty and Emergency

Let's Make Art Like Roberto Mamani Mamani, September 27, 2023, Santa Clara City Library

Artist Talk, September 29, 2023, Bryn Mawr college

Arts Enrichment-Arte Y Cultura: Contemporary explorations, January 22, 2021 – May 21, 2021, Kala Art Institute

Mother Earth "Pachamama" Colors and the Andean Cosmovision' October 25 – November 9, 2017, Korea Foundation Gallery

Permanent collection, Cornell Art Museum
