= Zampaya =

- Town
- Location within Bolivia
- Coordinates: 16°5′S 69°6′W
- Country: Bolivia
- Department: La Paz Department
- Province: Manco Kapac Province
- Municipality: Copacabana Municipality
- Canton: Zampaya Canton

Population (2001)
  - Total: 141
- Time zone: UTC-4 (BOT)

Zampaya is a small location in the La Paz Department in Bolivia situated in the Copacabana Municipality, the first municipal section of the Manco Kapac Province. It is the seat of the Zampaya Canton.

== See also ==
- Yampupata Peninsula (in Zambaya Canton)
