= Isabella Mamani =

Chilean attorney and politician

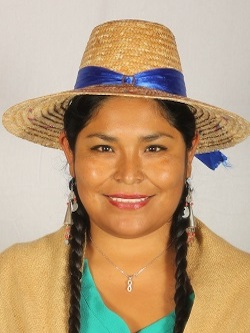
- Mamani in 2022

Member of the Constitutional Convention of Chile
- In office 4 July 2021 – July 4, 2022
- Preceded by: office established
- Succeeded by: office abolished
- Constituency: Aymara at-large

Personal details
- Born: Isabella Brunilda Mamani Mamani; 9 September 1982 (age 44) Chile
- Education: Arturo Prat University
- Occupation: Politician

Isabella Brunilda Mamani Mamani (born 9 September 1982) is an Aymara attorney and politician in Chile. In 2021, she was elected to represent the Aymara people in a reserved seat on the Chilean Constitutional Convention.

== Early life and education ==
Mamani was born to an Aymara family on 9 September 1982. Mamani graduated with a law degree from Arturo Prat University and has credited her education with giving her the tools she needed to advocate for her people. She is a resident of the Alto Hospicio, Tarapacá Region, and is currently studying for a master's degree in procedural law from the Central University of Chile.

== Constitutional Convention ==
Following her election to the Constitutional Convention in 2021, Mamani embarked on a seven-day journey from Alto Hospicio to Santiago, where the body is located. Though the trip would ordinarily take a few hours time, Mamani explained that "[e]very time the Aymara people do something or buy something or want something, they always ask permission from the Pachamama and the Tata Inti for us to do well. You always have to respect that.” During her week-long trip to Santiago, she stopped in Colchane to "receiv[e] the blessing from the caciques", and visited other areas of ancestral importance to the Aymara people.

=== Phawa controversy ===
Mamami requested that she be allowed to perform a phawa, a traditional Aymara prayer ceremony, at the site of the Constitutional Convention. This request was declined by Executive Secretary of the Administrative Secretariat Francisco Encina, who defended his decision on the basis of logistical issues. Encina's decision was met with calls for his resignation from indigenous activists.

=== Political views ===
On the subject of plurinationalism, Mamani has expressed concern that proposals for a "plurinational state" would amount to a mere recognition of indigenous autonomy without taking meaningful steps towards emboldening native communities. She cited the case of the Constitution of Bolivia that was pushed forward by then-President Evo Morales, a fellow Aymara, that she considers to have failed to meaningfully uplifted the indigenous peoples of Bolivia. Mamani stated:

"I like the wording of the Bolivian Constitution, but in practice, its indigenous legislation has been limited. We want this to not be the case in this new Constitution, but rather for the plurinational State to be transversal and recognize all the first nations and their self-determination in all areas: legal, political, social, cultural..."
