= Lokha =

Lokha Лоха
- Selo
- Location within Vologda Oblast Location within Russia
- Coordinates: 59°39′N 45°32′E
- Country: Russia
- Region: Vologda Oblast
- District: Nikolsky District
- Time zone: UTC+3:00

Lokha (Russian: Лоха) is a rural locality (a selo) in Baydarovskoye Rural Settlement, Nikolsky District, Vologda Oblast, Russia. The population was 2 as of 2002.

== Geography ==
Lokha is located 21 km northeast of Nikolsk (the district's administrative centre) by road. Bolshoy Dvor is the nearest rural locality.
