= Peg loom =

Simple weaving loom

A peg loom is a simple weaving loom. Handheld weaving sticks use the same principle.

A peg loom is a board, usually wooden, with one or more rows of holes, and a set of wooden or nylon pegs which fit into these holes. Each peg is a dowel with a hole drilled along its diameter near one end. Handheld weaving sticks are similar to the pegs, but tapered at the hole end and pointed at the other end. Plastic looms are also made for the educational market.

Double-length warp threads are threaded through the hole in each peg or stick, and the loose ends knotted. The pegs are inserted into the loom, or the sticks are handheld, and the weft thread is woven around the pegs or sticks. As the work progresses, it is slid off the pegs or sticks onto the trailing warp threads. Different yarns can be used to create patterns, and when using sticks a curved piece of work can be created by weaving less often round certain sticks.

Looms are made in a range of sizes. As an example, one English company makes looms from 200–1,200 millimetres (8–47 in), with 9-63 holes. Most of their looms have three rows of holes, with 6mm pegs at spacings of 12.5mm and 9mm holes at spacings of 18.5 and 25.4mm. A larger scale peg loom has been used to create sleeping mats for homeless people from recycled plastic carrier bags.

It has been said that stick weaving was used by people of the Great Lakes region of North America in the 1500s when French trappers first encountered them, and that in the 18th century it was taught to children to develop their manual dexterity before they entered the weaving trade.
