= Architecture of Bolivia =

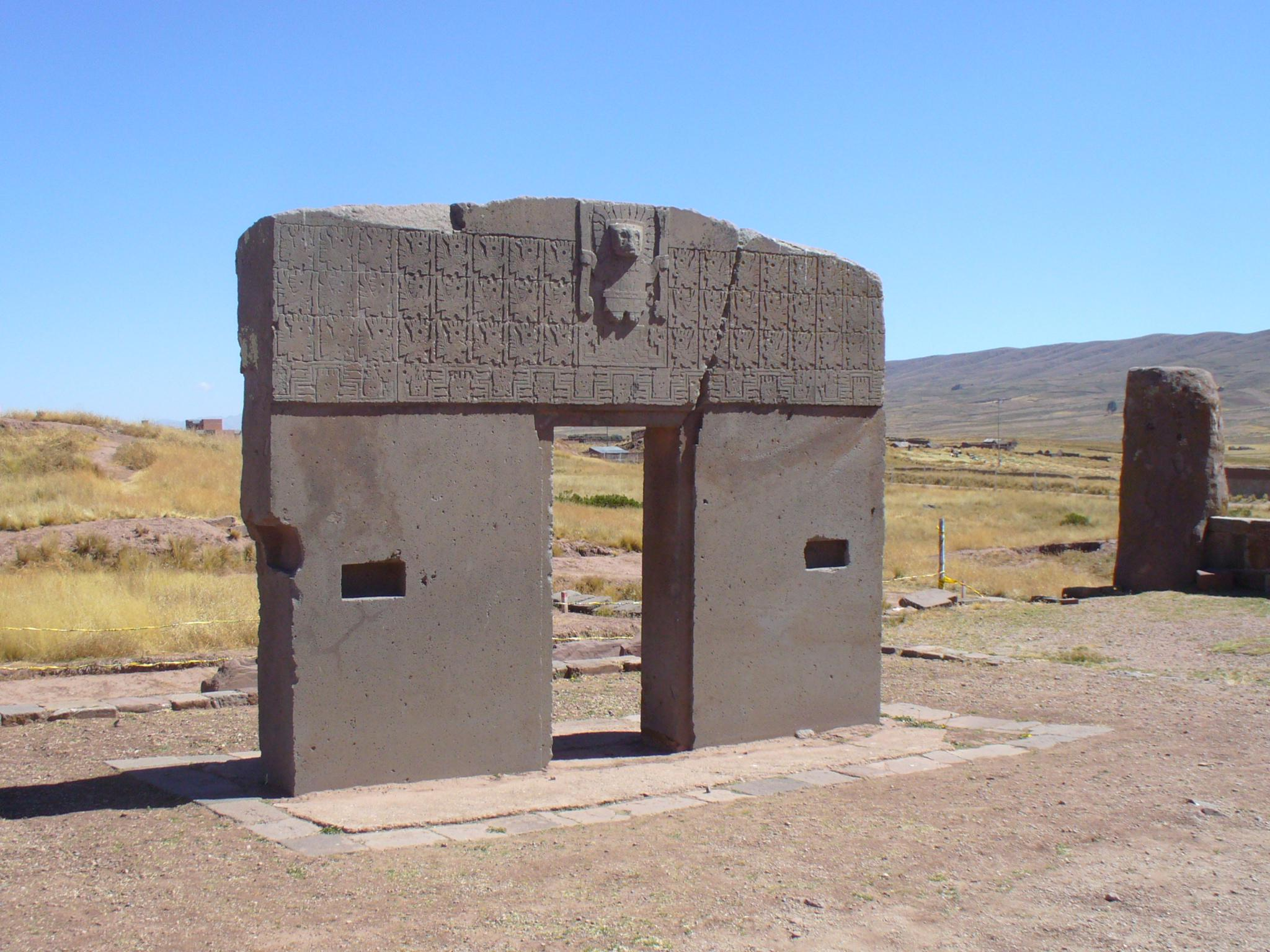
Gate of the Sun in Tiwanaku ruins, the symbol of the culture of Tiwanaku.

The architecture of Bolivia is closely related to its history, culture and religion. Bolivian architecture has been constantly changing and progressing over time. Subject to terrain and high altitudes, most of Bolivia's Pre-Columbian buildings were built for public, religious, and ceremonial purposes mainly influenced by Bolivian indigenous culture. The arrival of Spanish settlers brought many European-style buildings, and the Spaniards began planning to build big cities. After Independence, the architectural style became Neoclassical and many churches and government buildings were built. In modern Bolivia, like many countries, skyscrapers and post-modern buildings dominate, and of course there are special styles of architecture to attract tourists and build.

Before the arrival of Spanish settlers, the architecture of the Tiwanaku Empire and the Inca Empire was the main representative of the architectural style of Pre-Columbian Bolivia. They not only reflect the culture of their respective empires, but also the Bolivian indigenous culture.

During the Spanish colonial period, when the Spanish colonists built the big cities, they not only brought the Baroque style from Europe, but also the new building materials and religions from Europe. At the same time, Bolivia's original architectural style and Baroque style led to a new style, known as the Andean Baroque style. In modern times, like many countries, modern Bolivian architecture is dominated by modern and postmodernism. In order to meet the needs of tourism and benefit by the unique geographical environment of Bolivia, some other styles of architecture have emerged in Bolivia which better showing the diverse architecture of Bolivia.

== History ==
=== Tiwanaku empire (400–1000) ===
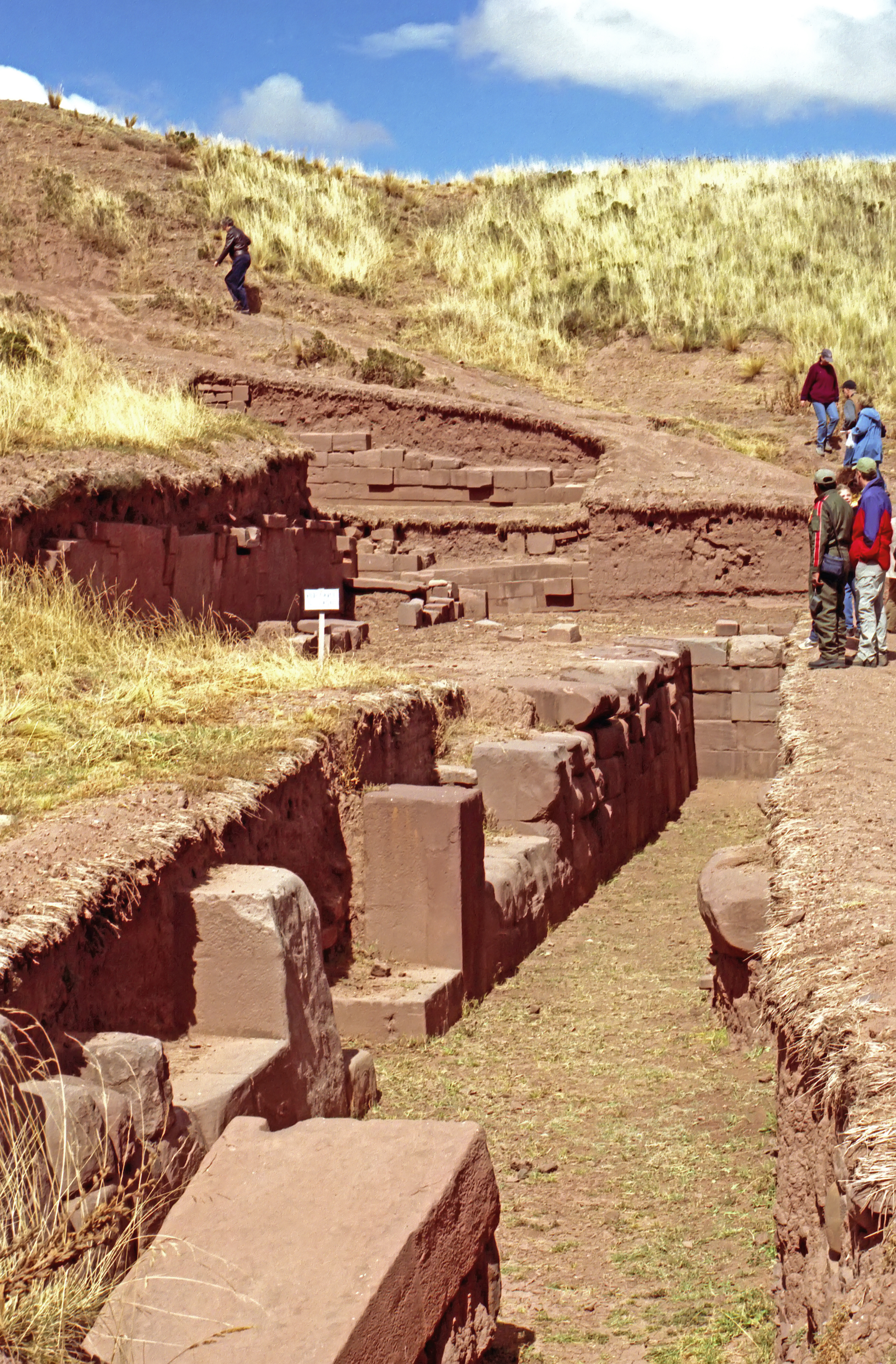
Akapana, which was the largest structure in the religious complex.

Tiwanaku is located near the southern shore of Lake Titicaca at an altitude of 3,850 meters. Most of the ancient city sites were built from adobe, although they are now covered by modern towns, but representative stone buildings survive in protected archaeological areas. It was a prosperous and planned city between 400 AD and 900 AD. The city has impressive stone carvings and complex underground drainage systems that control the flow of rain. At the same time, there are many buildings related to religion and political structure, such as Temple Semi-underground, the terraced platform mound Akapana, Kalasasaya‘s Temple and Palace of Putuni. One of the most spectacular monuments in Tiwanaku is Akapana. This is a terraced platform mound with an initial stack of seven superimposed platforms with a stone retaining wall of up to 18 meters, but now only the lowest and a small part of it are well preserved. According to the investigations, it was clad in sandstone and surrounded by well-preserved drainage systems.

Located in the north is Kalasasaya‘s Temple, which is believed to have been used as an observatory. The most representative of it is the two huge sun gates cut from andesite, which is one of the most important representatives of Tiwanaku art. There are niches at the sides of the door, and a well-designed bas-relief above the door. The Temple Semi-underground also has beautifully carved. The walls are made up of 48 red sandstone columns with many carved stones set into it. It is clear that the former settlers of the city had a superb technique of carving and polishing various stone materials, combined with architectural techniques to make the architecture of the Tiwanaku empire more recognizable and representative. The ruins of ancient city of Tiwanaku has been listed on the World Heritage List by the United Nations Educational, Scientific and Cultural Organization (UNESCO) in 2000.

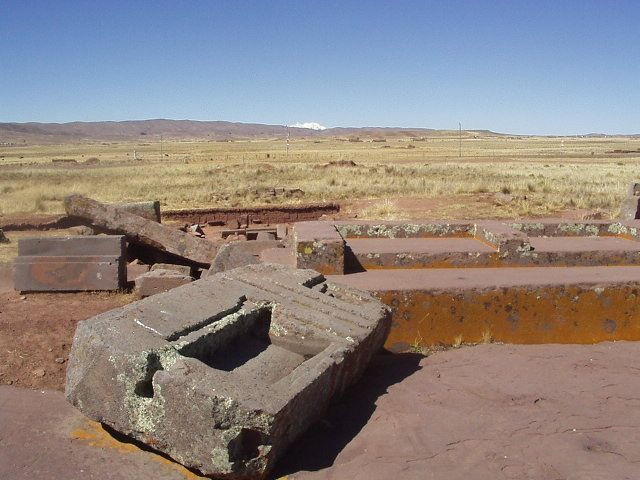
The ruins of Tiwanaku

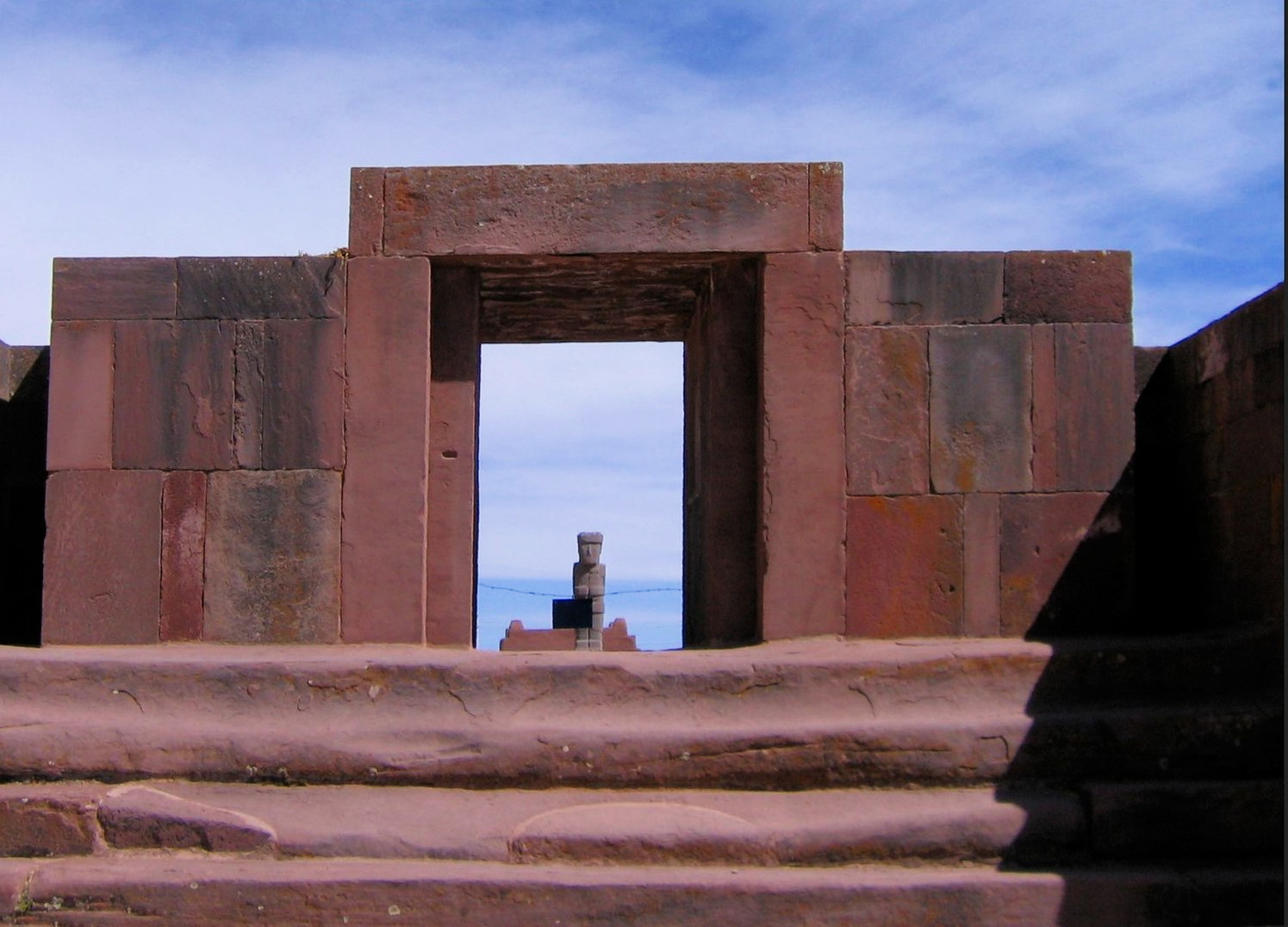
Two huge andesite sun gates of Kalasasaya‘s Temple, with niches and well-designed bas-relief.

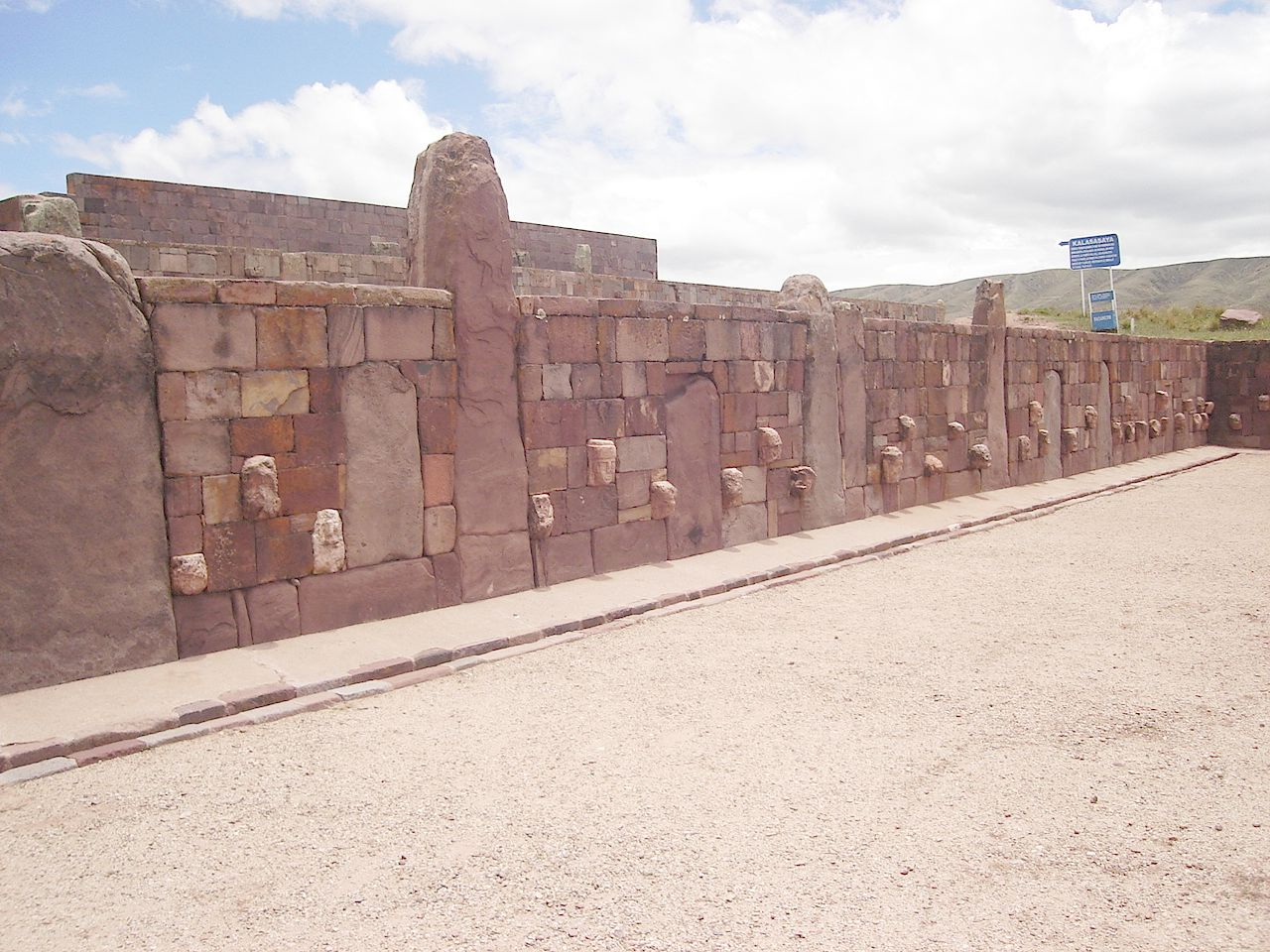
The walls of Semi-subterranean Temple are made up with sandstone columns and carved stone.

=== Inca empire (1438–1471) ===
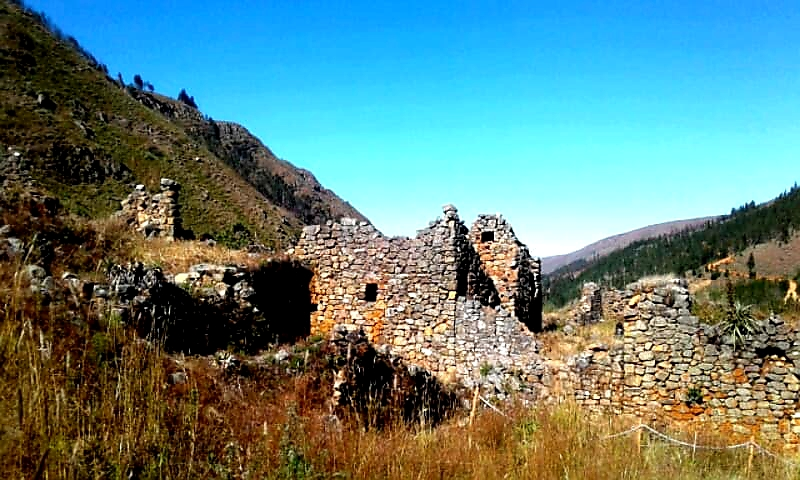
The ruins of Incallajta

Bolivia became part of the Inca Empire in the 13th century. Because the Inca Empire occupied Bolivia through invasion, many of the buildings of this period began to have military use, many fortresses and defensive walls appeared, and the buildings of this period had better comprehensiveness. The archaeological site of Incallajta covers an area of 67 hectares and is one of the main Inca sites in Bolivia. Incallajta can be considered a building similar to the Pocona fortress, with nearly forty buildings and a defensive wall, and the large space that can be covered is characteristic of Inca architecture. This is the Inca complex in Bolivia, with habitational, defensive, military, religious agricultural and towers for astronomy. The archaeological site of Incallajta was the largest and most important administrative centre in the region. In 2003, it was submitted to the Tentative Lists in the Global Strategy part created by UNESCO.

=== Spanish colonial period (1538–1825) ===
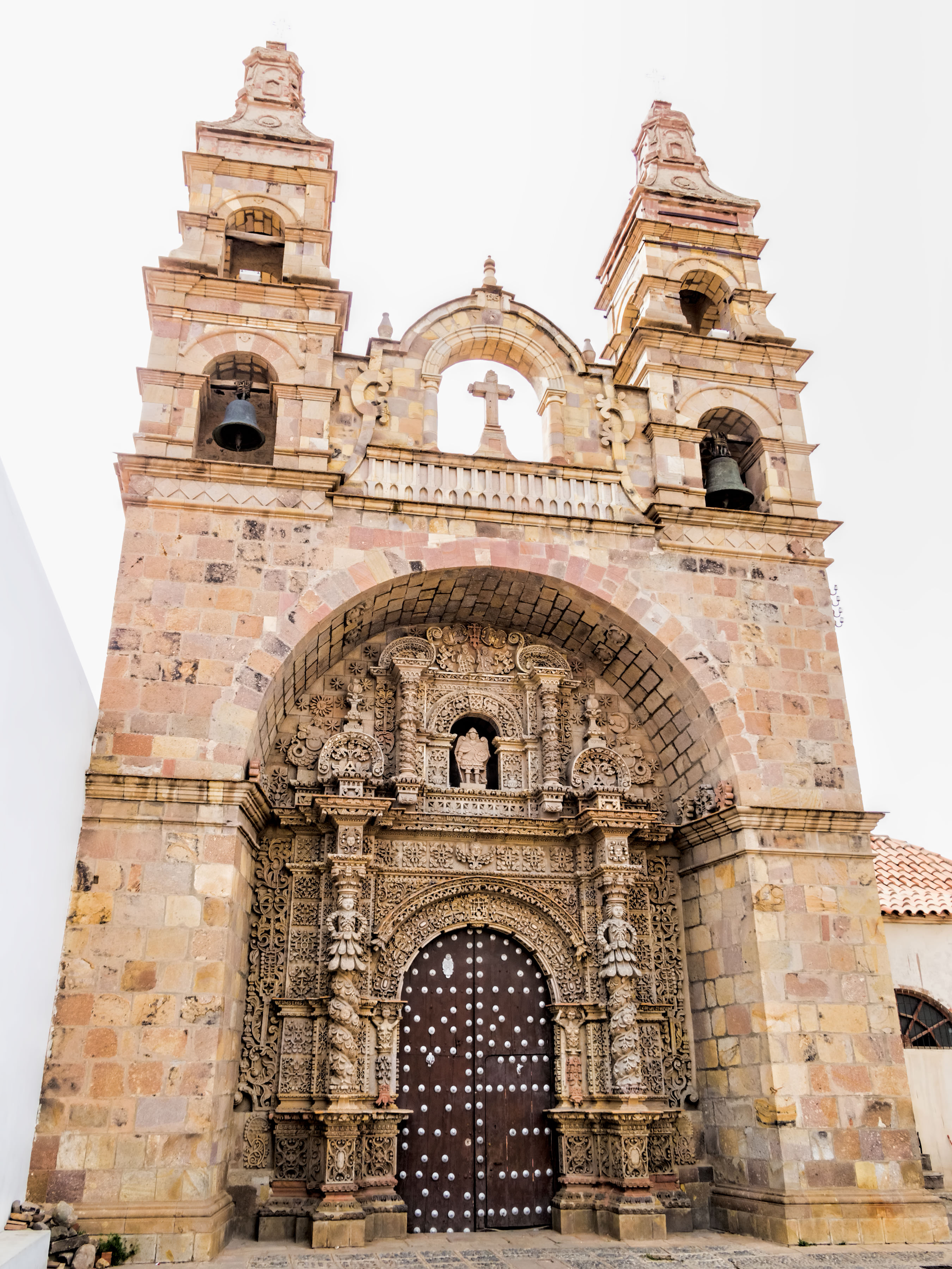
The Church of St. Lawrence, built by indigenous people in a mestizo baroque style

With the arrival of Spanish settlers, almost all Bolivian architecture has changed. They bring Baroque style, new building materials and enough wealth. With the massive construction, the architectural landscape of Bolivia has changed. For Aboriginal people, the biggest change in housing is the introduction of adobe to replace the previous mud and clay mixture. Over time, this kind of European traditional style house with a courtyard and red tile roof is becoming more and more popular.

However, the more obvious change is that Spanish settlers began to build big cities. These large cities are usually centered around a cathedral and palace which built in the "Andean Baroque style." This style is a combination of Baroque style and original architecture style of Bolivia, although in most cases it looks almost identical to the original. In the period when Bolivia was colonized by Spain, this style can be found in most cities in Bolivia, the most representative being the City of Potosí. City of Potosí is the largest supplier of silver in Spain during the Spanish colonial period. It is even hailed as the world's largest industrial park in the 16th century, with a major impact on the Spanish economy and the global economy. So in the 17th century, about 160,000 Spanish colonists lived in the city. In other words, the city is a good example of Bolivian architecture in Spanish colonial times. Not only has the various industrial infrastructures required for mining, but also has many buildings related to daily life. There is no doubt that the Spanish colonists established a European-style church associated with religion and its high-end residence. In this city, many buildings have adopted the “Andean Baroque style”, which blends Indian style. Potosi also has a lasting impact on the architecture of central Bolivia and the Andes by spreading Brazilian architectural style. City of Potosí has been listed on the World Heritage List by the UNESCO in 1987.

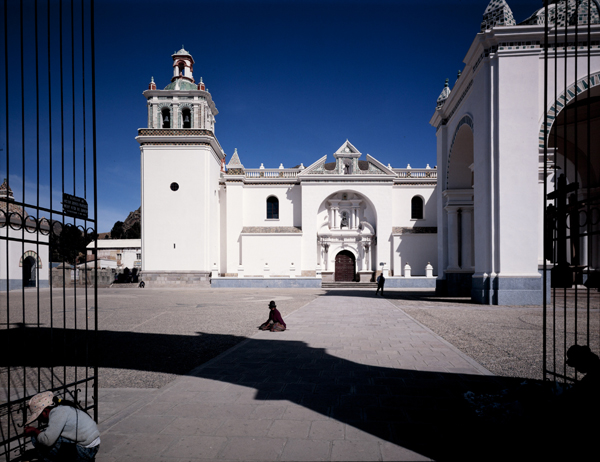
Iglesia Nuestra Señora, a Baroque style church in Bolivia, 17th century.

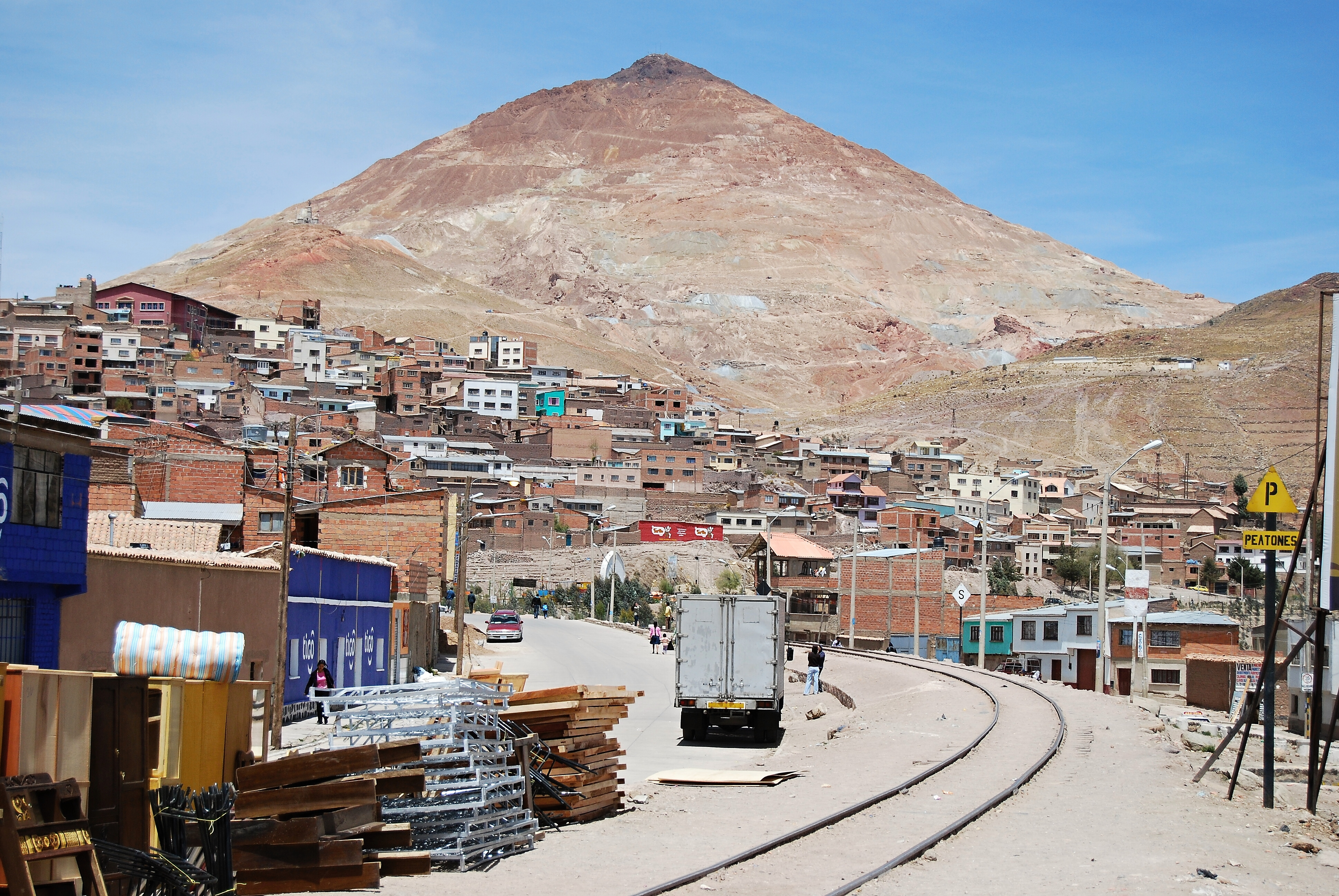
City of Potosí, a mining town at the foot of Rich Hill (Cerro Rico), the world’s largest silver deposit.

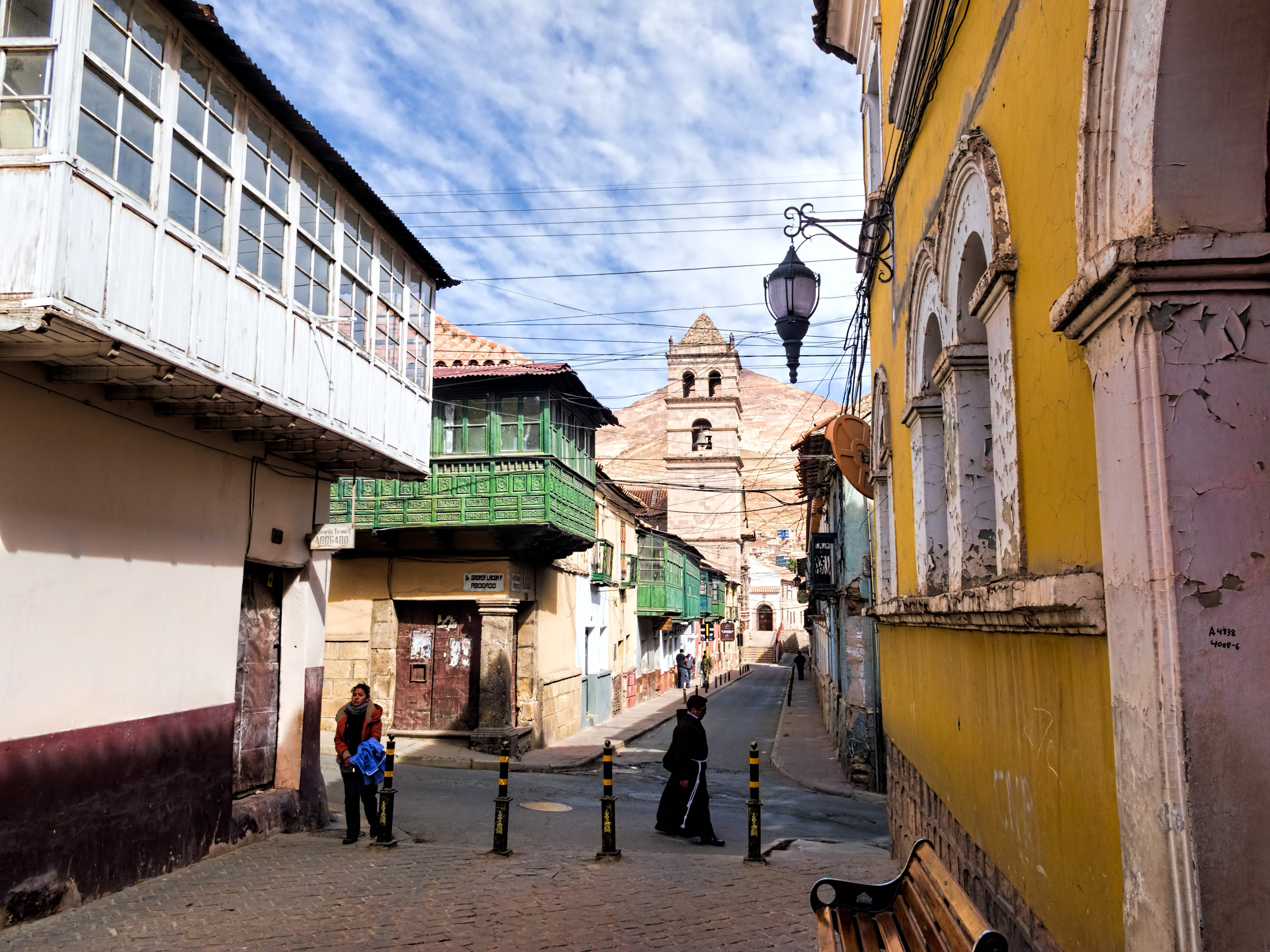
City of Potosí: Balconies without glass windows were a common feature of colonial architecture.

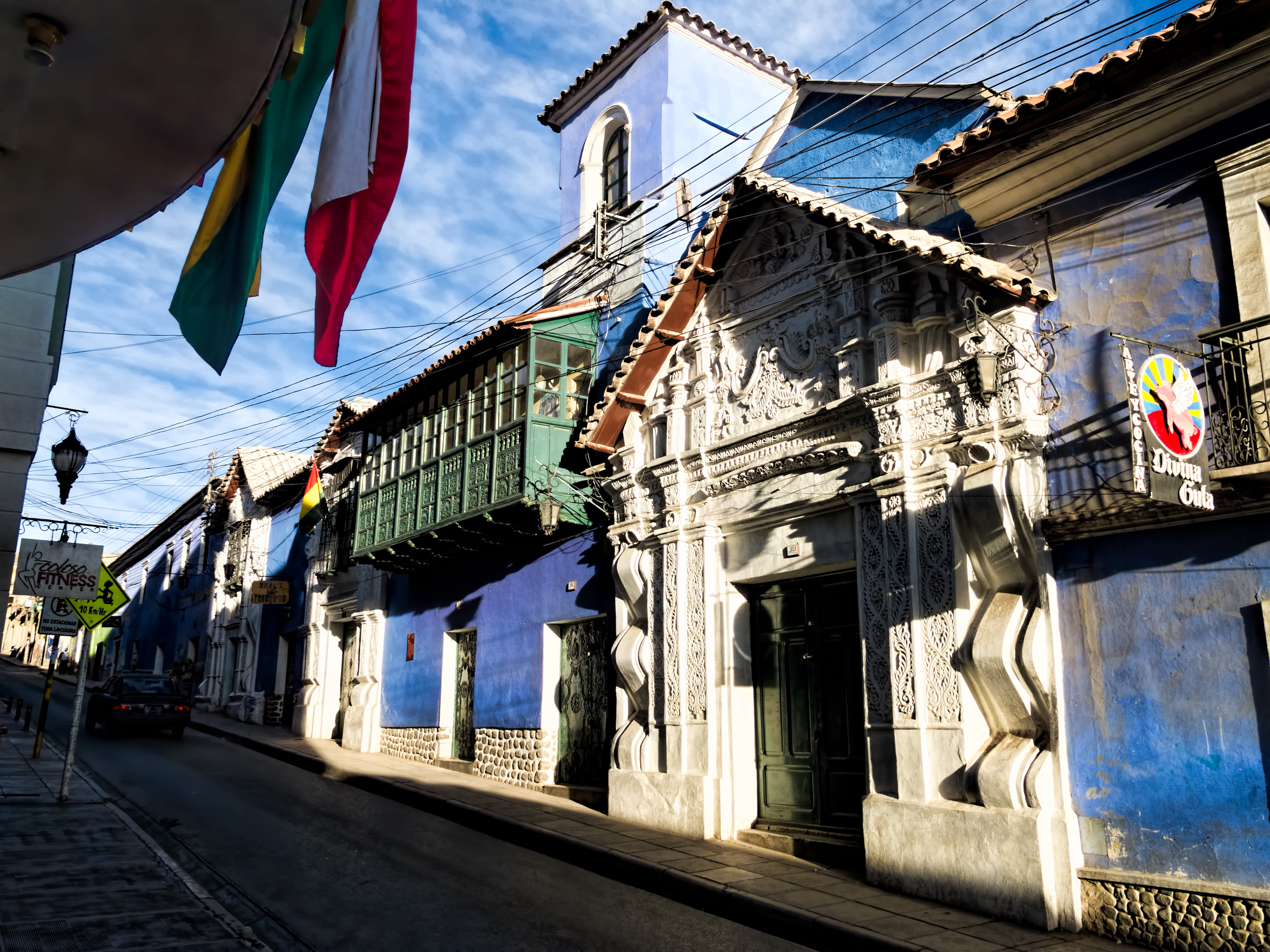
City of Potosí: The House of Three Doors is an example of colonial architecture, belongs to indigenous people in Bolivia.

Another representative city built by the Spanish settlers is the Historic City of Sucre. This is a city built in the south-central part of Bolivia in the first half of the 16th century. The various buildings in the city are well preserved, blending in Latin America and kinds of European architectural style

Sucre's predecessor was La Plata, a silver town founded by the Spanish settlers in 1538. It is the representative of the indigenous culture of Characas. To commemorate the independent leader Antonio Jose de Sucre, it was designated as the first capital of Bolivia and renamed Sucre. This historic city was designed according to a simple urban plan, with a checkerboard pattern of streets, similar to other cities established by the Spanish settlers in the United States during the same period. Since the wealth of the nearby City of Potosí has supported the economics of La Plata, La Plata has been the center of justice, religion and culture in the region since its establishment. In La Plata, Characas Audiencia is the prototype of the current Supreme Court. As a cultural centre, La Plata has many universities and royal colleges, such as the University of Saint-Francois-Xavier, the Royal Academia Carolina, and San Isabel de Hungria Seminario. These buildings are representative of the fusion of European architectural style and the style of local architecture in Latin America.

Of course, in Sucre, the most representative architectural style is religious architecture. A series of cathedrals built since the 16th century, such as San Lázaro, San Francisco, Santo Domingo and the Metropolitan Cathedral. In the 250-year span of construction, the integration of the architectural styles of the two continents became more and more mature. As one of the most important construction in Bolivia, Casa de la Libertad was built in 1621 as part of the Convent of the Jesuits, where it witnessed the independence of Bolivia. The 18th century architecture best reflects the style of the local architecture, similar to the structure in the same period in City of Potosí. Architecture in Sucre, is a complete display of the architectural style brought from Europe and the blend of local architectural styles and traditions in Bolivia, including the architectural traditions and styles of the Renaissance, Mudéjar, Gothic, Baroque and Neoclassical periods. Historic City of Sucre has been listed on the World Heritage List by the UNESCO in 1991.

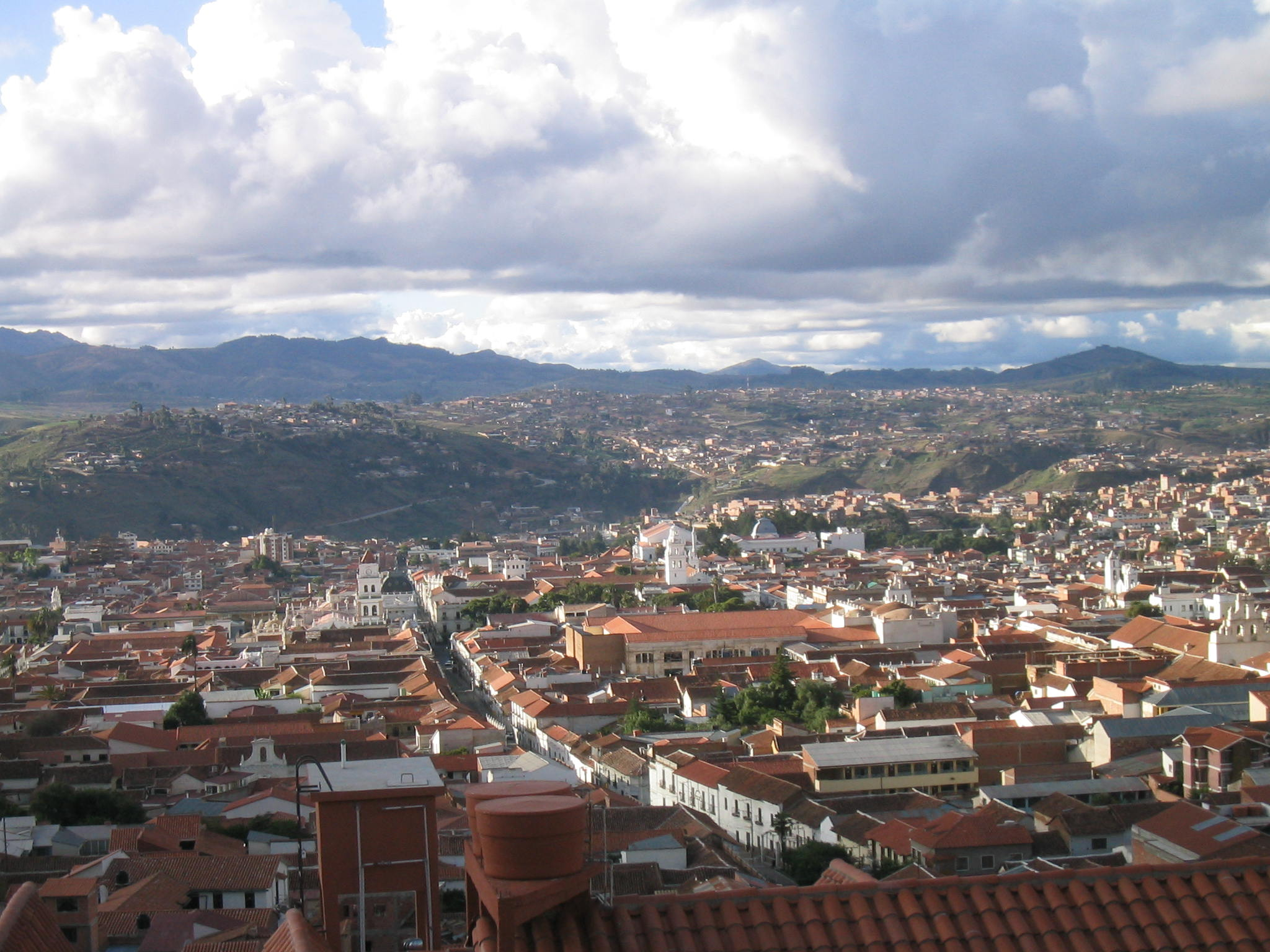
Sucre, the capital of Bolivia

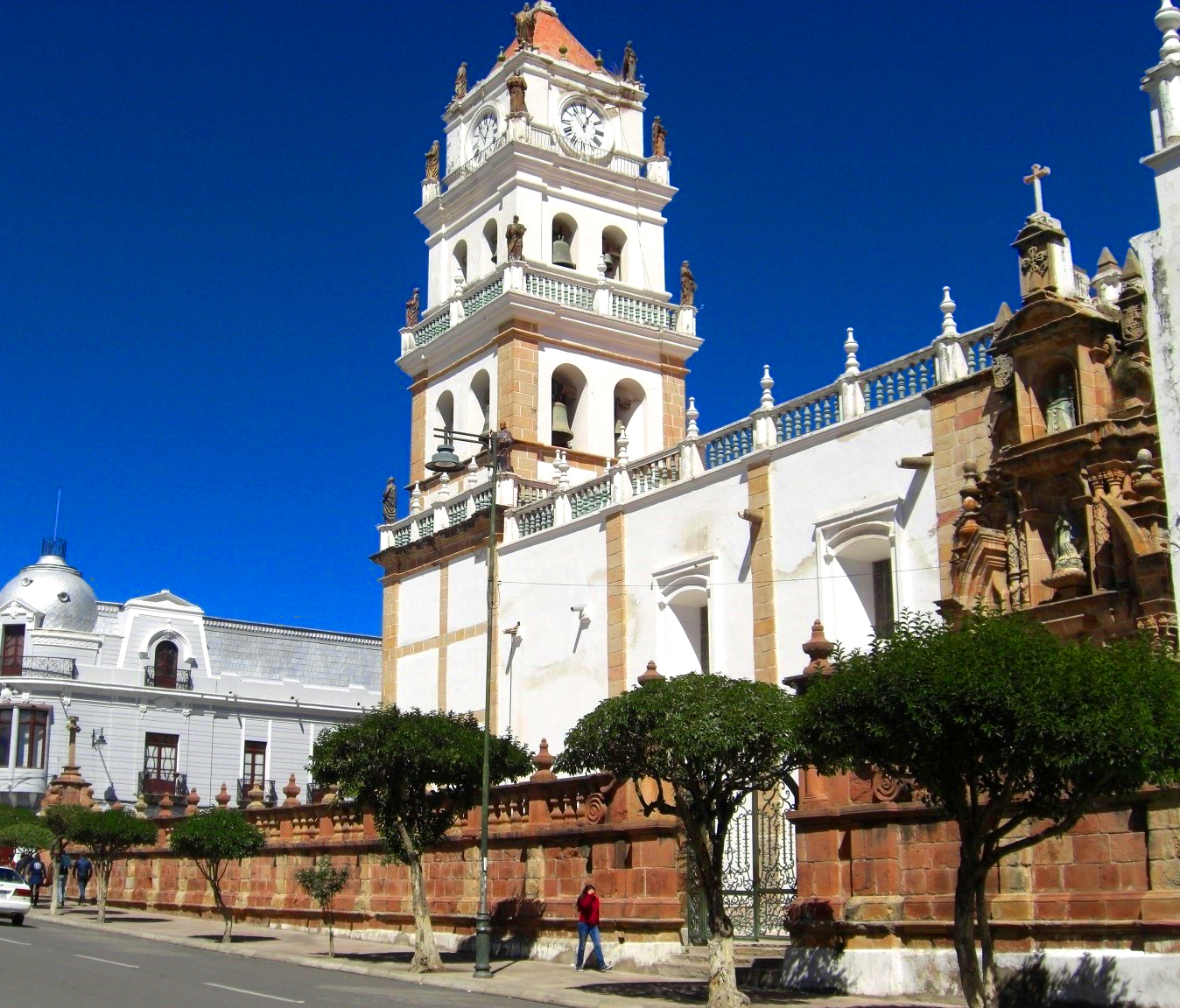
The Metropolitan Cathedral, iconic architecture of “The White City” Sucre

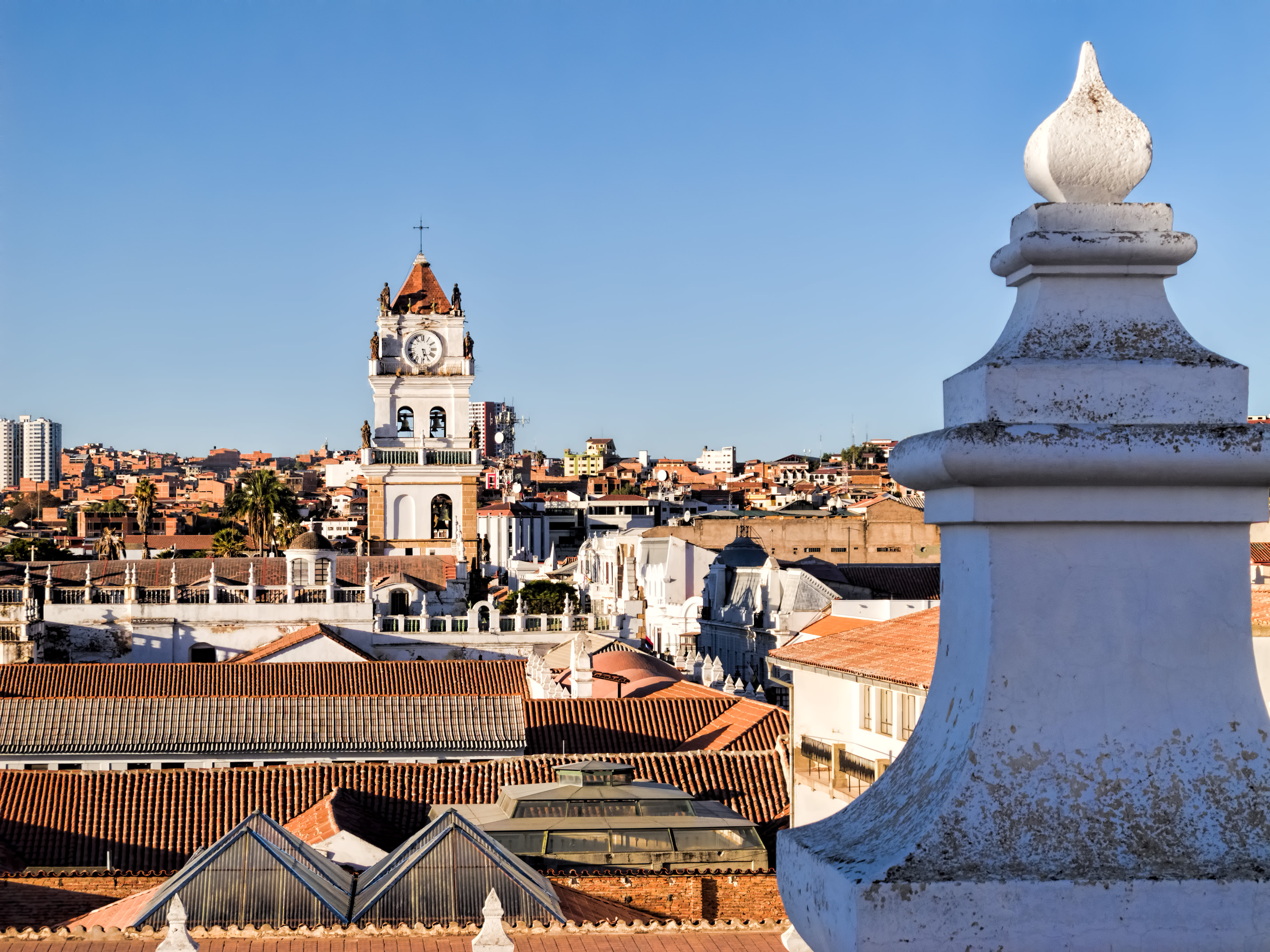
Iconic bell tower of the Metropolitan Cathedral

The Casa de la Libertad, house of freedom

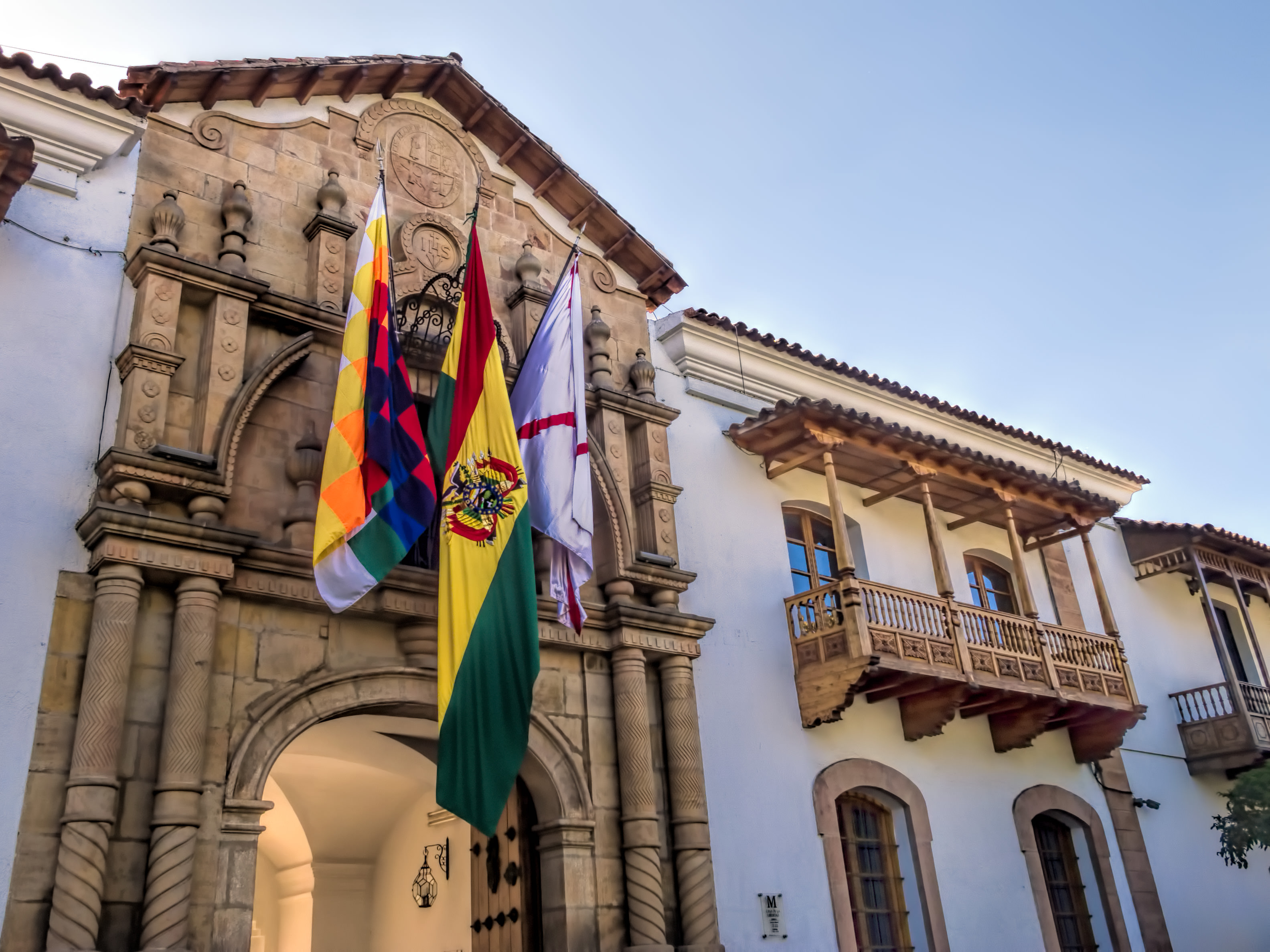
The entrance of the Casa de la Libertad, with three flags

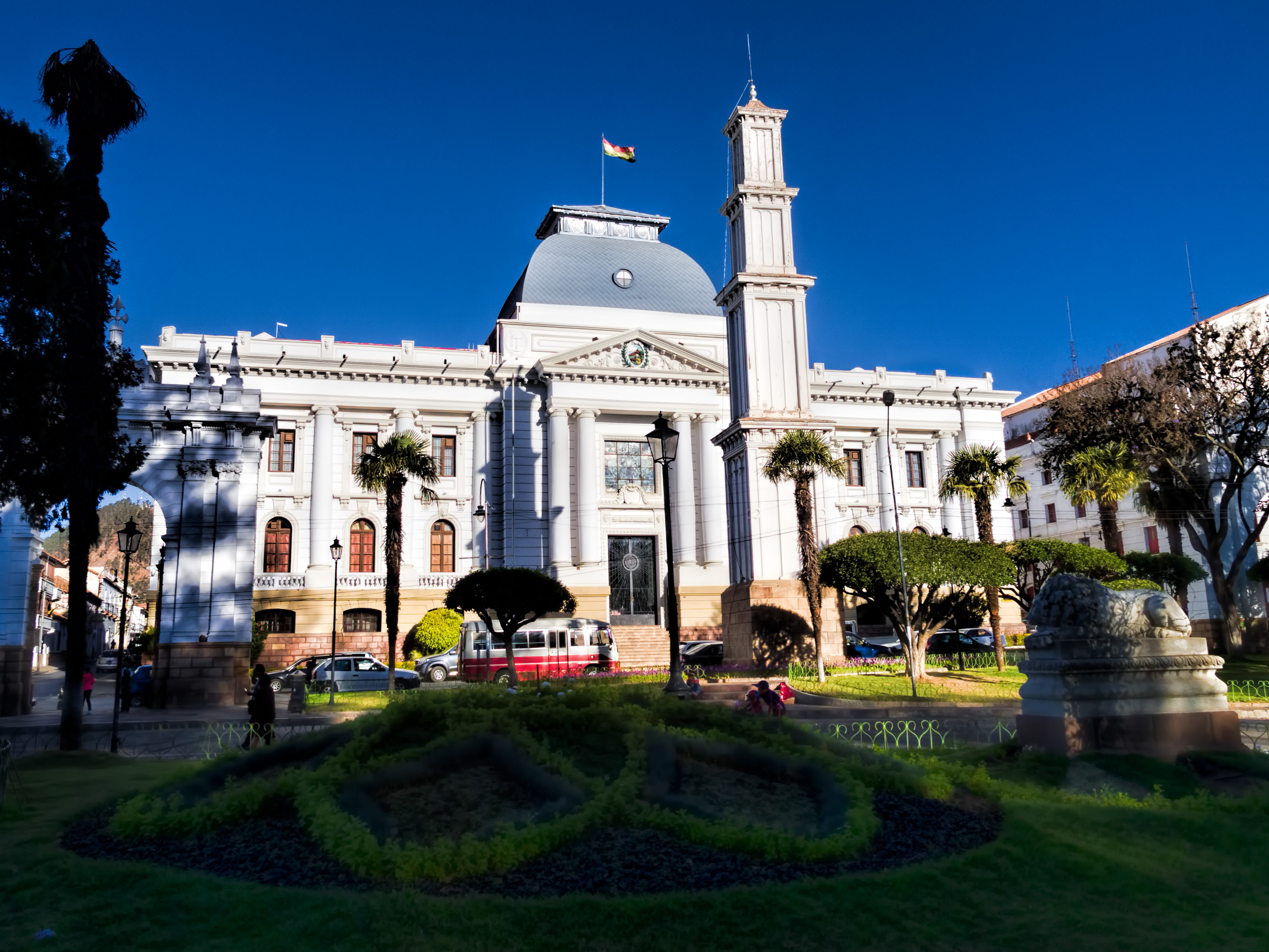
The Supreme Court building

=== After independence (1825–1982) ===
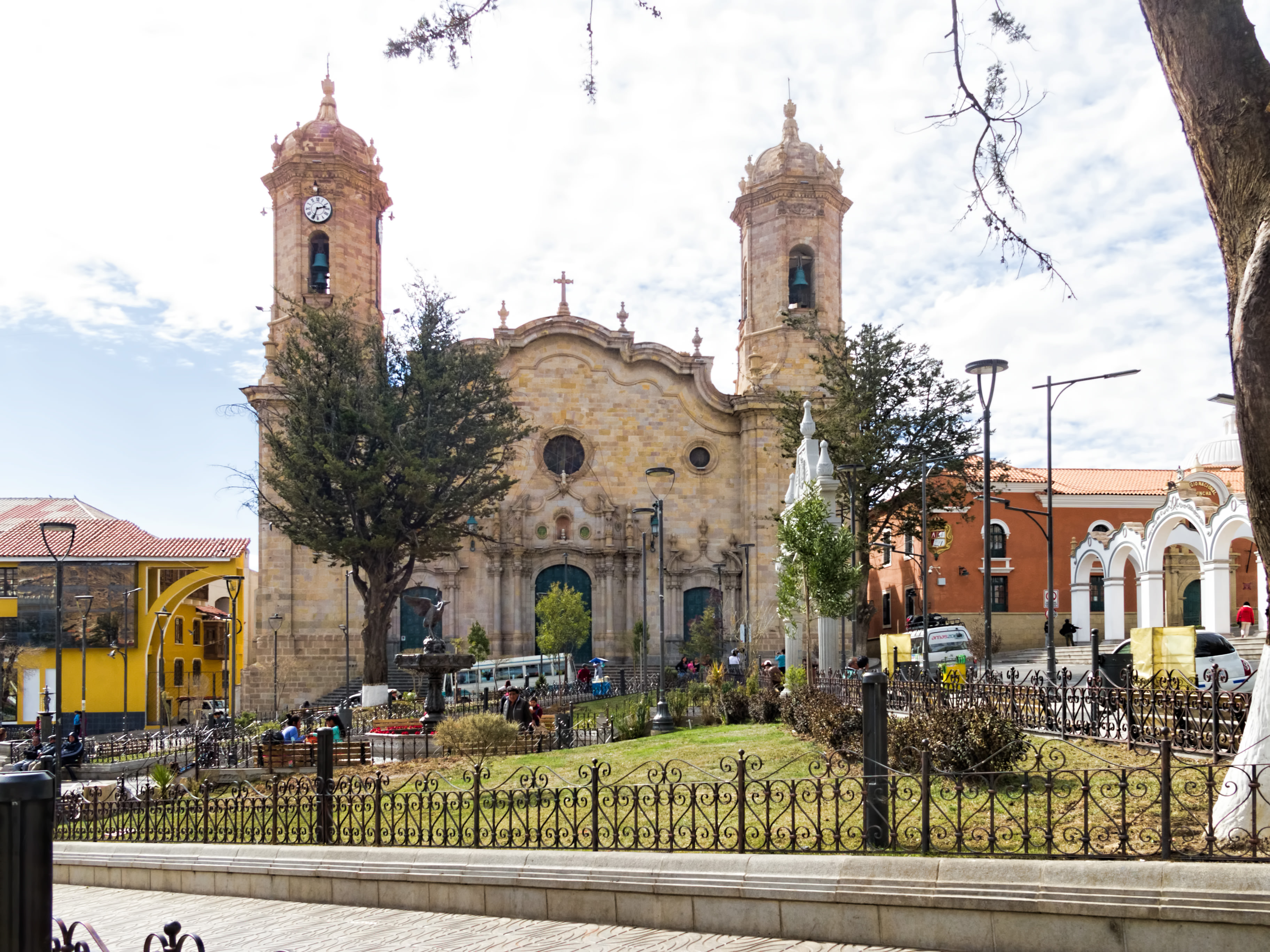
Cathedral Basilica of Our Lady of Peace, Potosí, rebuilt in neoclassical style in 19th century on the site where the previous church collapsed in 1807

After gained independence in the early 19th century, the architecture style in Bolivia changed in general. The architectural style became Neoclassical style, which is much like in Europe, but it also retained the characteristics of the early courtyard. During this time, large number of new churches and government buildings were built in Bolivia. But in the early 20th century, due to war, social unrest and economic depression, there was little development in Bolivia's architecture except for the necessary government buildings and churches.

=== Modern Bolivia (1982–present) ===
In the late 20th century and early 21st century, a large number of impressive buildings were built again in Bolivia. Like many countries in the world, modern Bolivian architecture is dominated by modern and postmodernism. Skyscrapers have risen in many cities and gradually occupied the skyline. Some representative cities are San Jorge, La Paz, Santa Cruz and Cochabamba. The Top 10 skyscrapers in Bolivia are almost in La Paz and Santa Cruz. The tallest skyscraper of Bolivia is WTC TOYOSA Tower 1 which is 228 meters in La Paz. This is a building for office use.

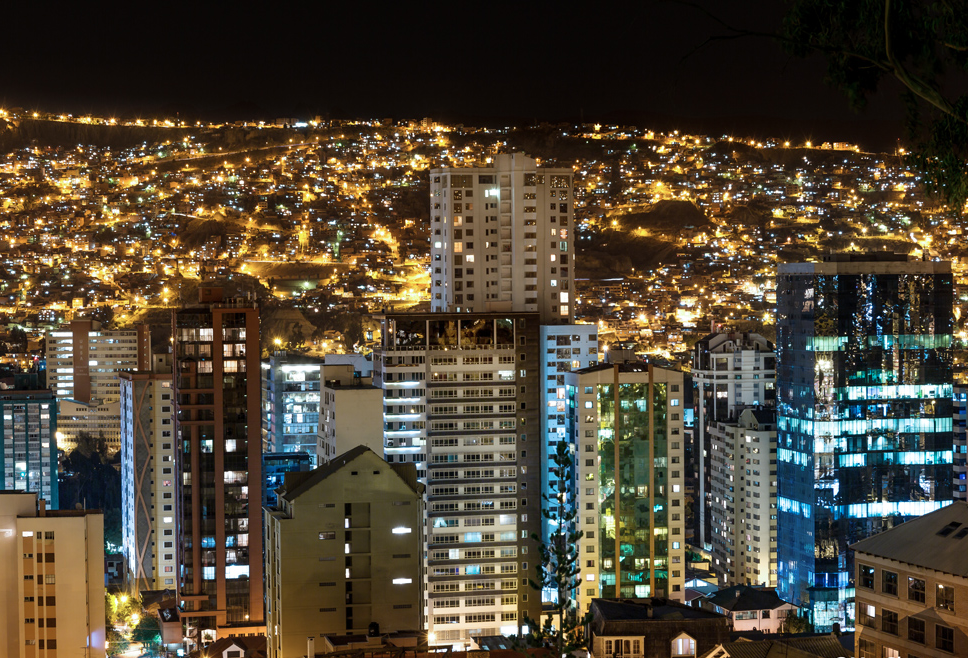
La Paz, Bolivia

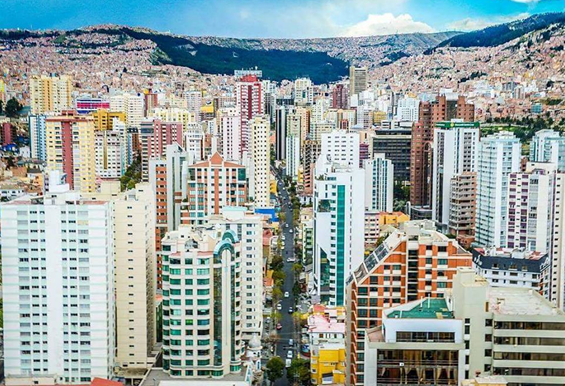
La Paz, Bolivia

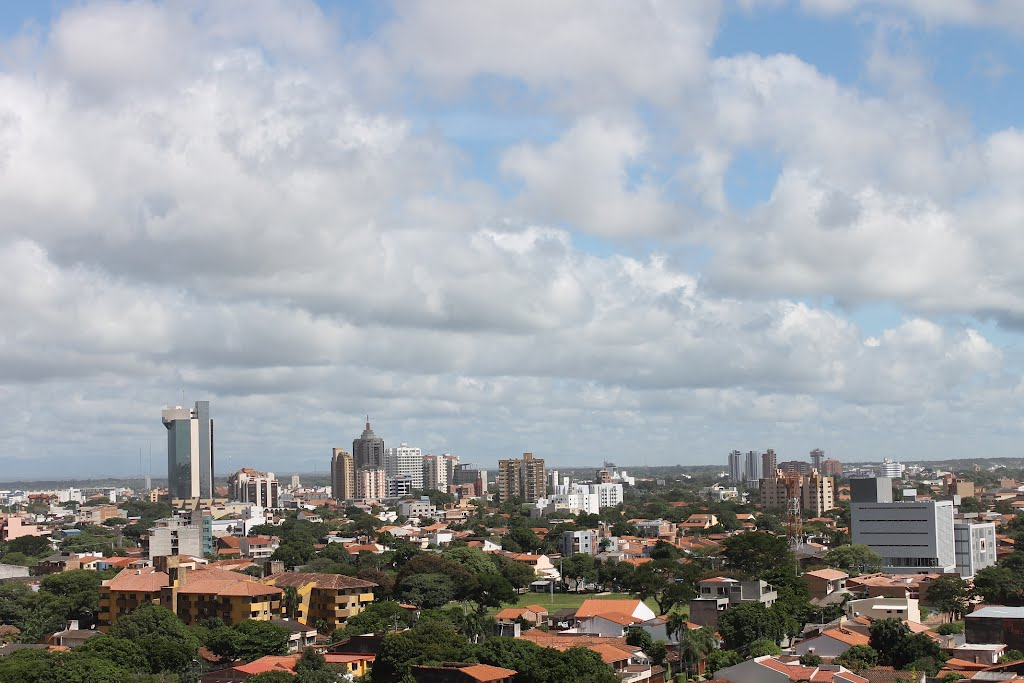
Santa Cruz, Bolivia

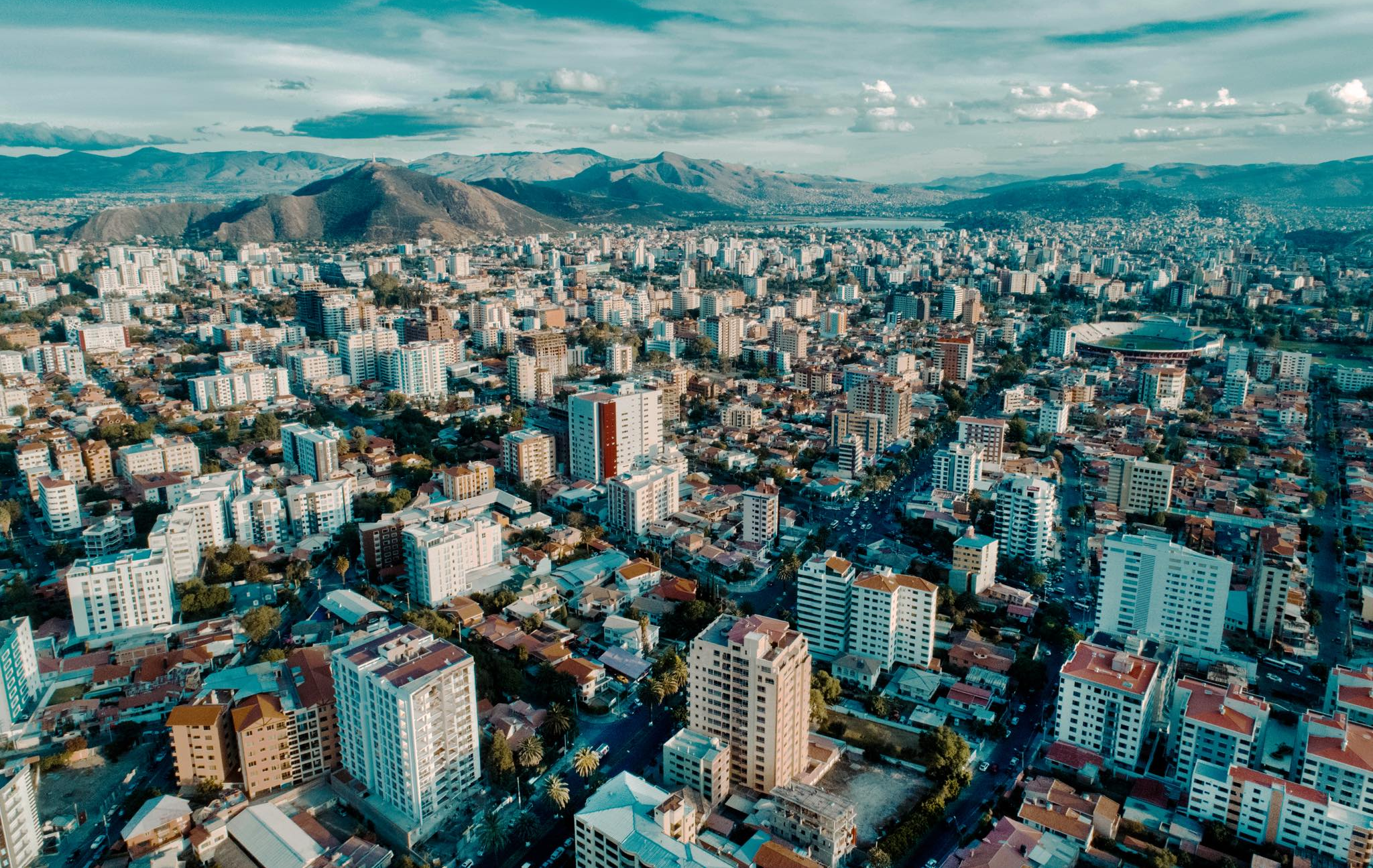
Cochabamba, Bolivia

At the same time, with the development of science and technology, some new technologies can be applied to buildings, especially to repair some old or damaged buildings. For example, there is a new technology for repairing the ruins of Tiwanaku, 3D printing. Some parts of the Tiwanaku ruins were damaged due to the destruction of the Spanish colonists. So this study converted the literature into a 3D form, then Researchers can try to make quick combinations, which often try different insights into previous architectural styles.

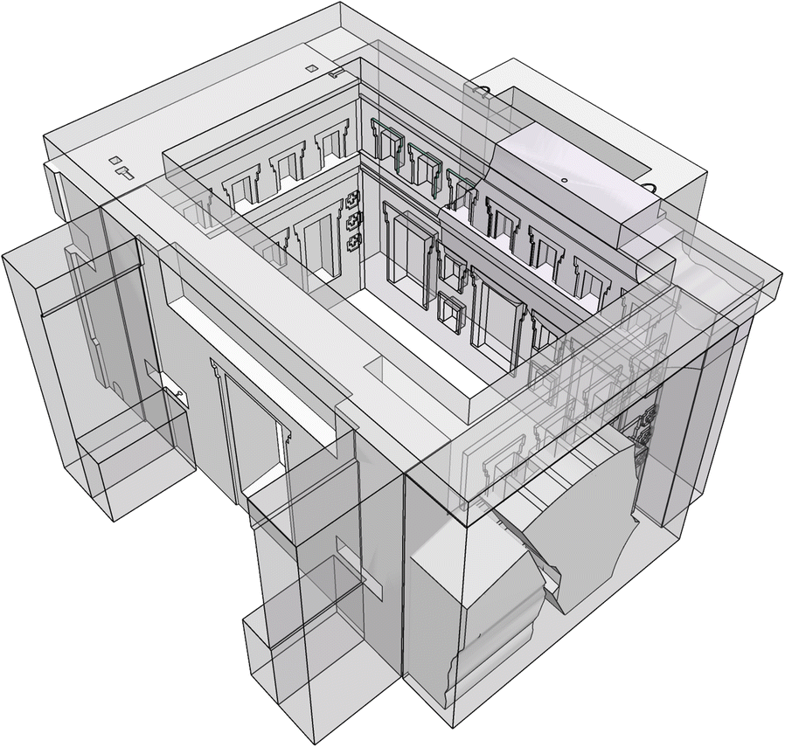
3D printing model pumapunku 1

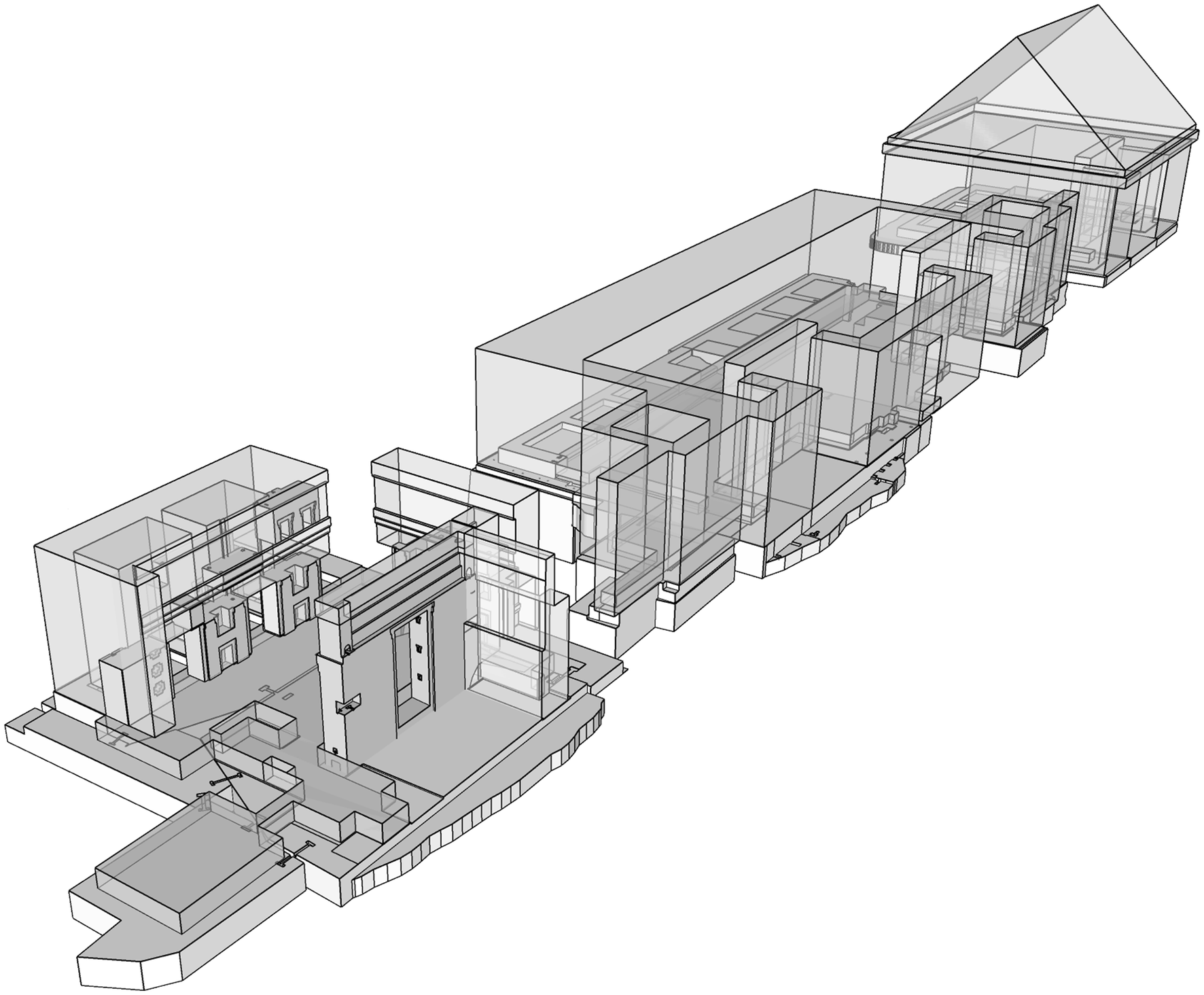
3D printing model pumapunku 2

== Other style of architecture of Bolivia ==
In Bolivia, there are other unique architectural styles due to historical, cultural and geographical reasons.

Over 15 km from Uyuni, southwest of Bolivia, there has the world’s largest salt flat, Salar de Uyuni. In order to attract tourists and provide them with convenience and comfort, combined with the local geographical environment, the world's first salt hotel, Palacio de Sal was built in 1998. This is an almost 100% salt hotel built by solid salt bricks from Salar de Uyuni. The hotel incorporates salt into every detail of the design to better blend into the dramatic and spectacular environment, bringing visitors different experiences and memories. The infrastructure and furniture in the hotel are also made of solid salt bricks from Salar de Uyuni. such as tables, chairs and other utensils. In public areas, the carefully carved salt sculptures by Bolivian artists are equally eye-catching. This white environment is easily reminiscent of white minimalism. At the same time, in order to prevent the salt environment from being too smooth, the deep red wood brings warm colors. Combining a wall with an alcove, a bedroom with a domed salt brick ceiling and a cathedral-like vestibule, this hotel gives the impression of a modern and local Andean architecture style.

Unfortunately, the hotel must be demolished in 2002 due to environmental pollution caused by poor management. A new hotel was built at the eastern bank of Salar de Uyuni. Fortunately, the new hotel is still named after Palacio de Sal, and the infrastructure and furniture in the hotel are still made of solid salt bricks from Salar de Uyuni. But in order to comply with government standards, the health system has been redesigned. In the new hotel, same as the old hotel, people is forbidden to lick the walls in order to prevent the salt blocks from collapsing.

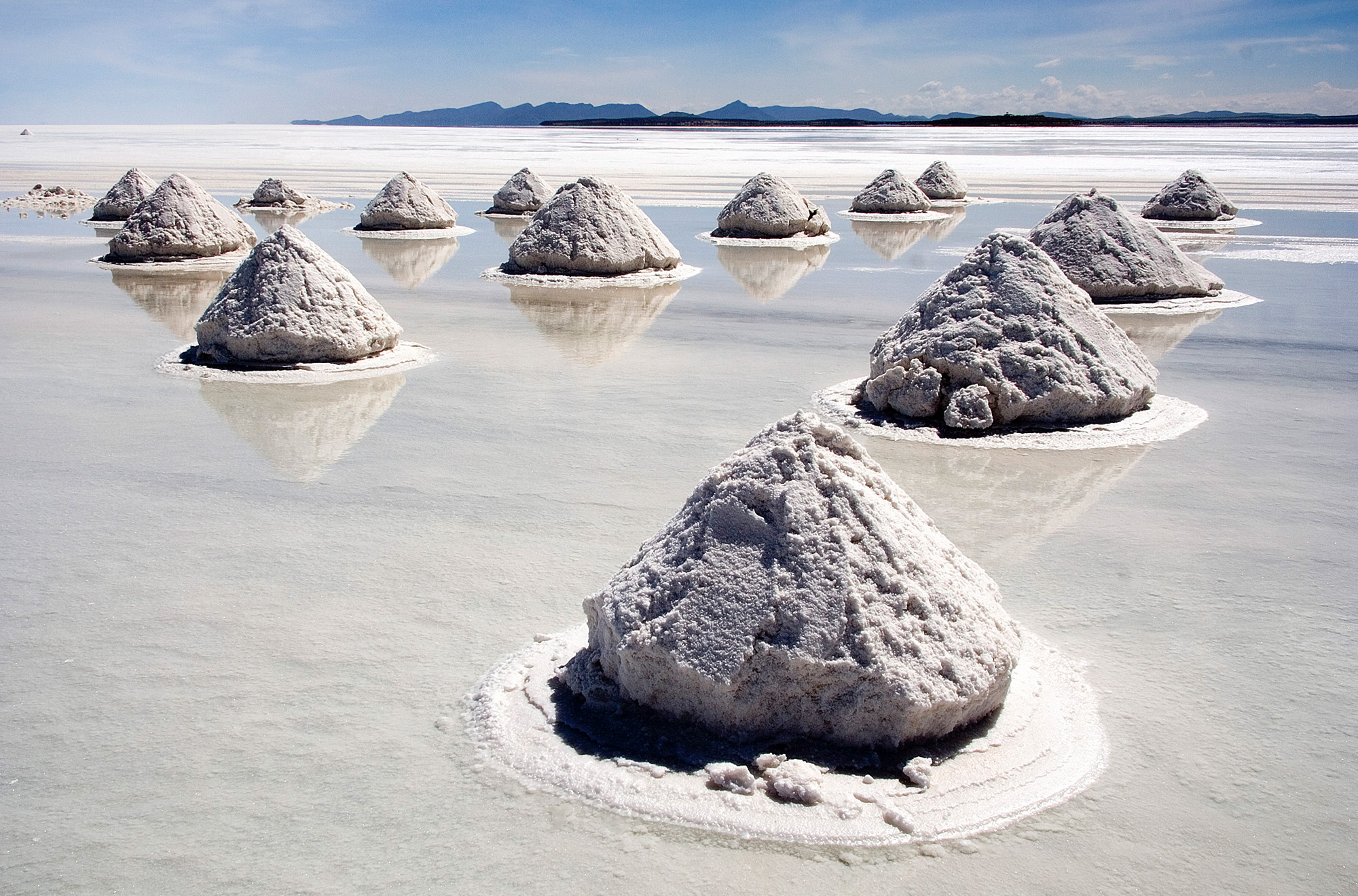
Piles of salt on the Salar de Uyuni

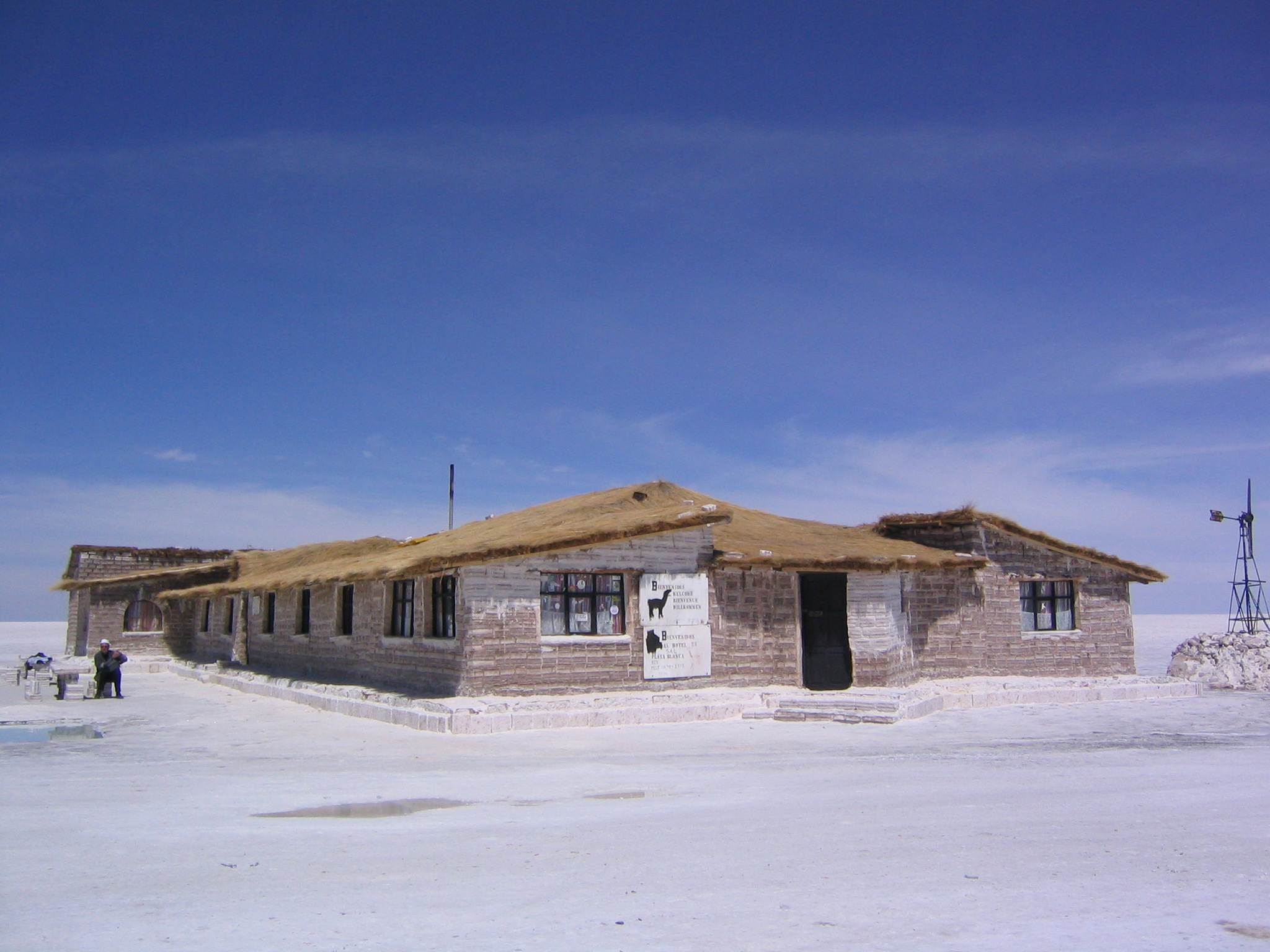
Palacio de Sal hotel

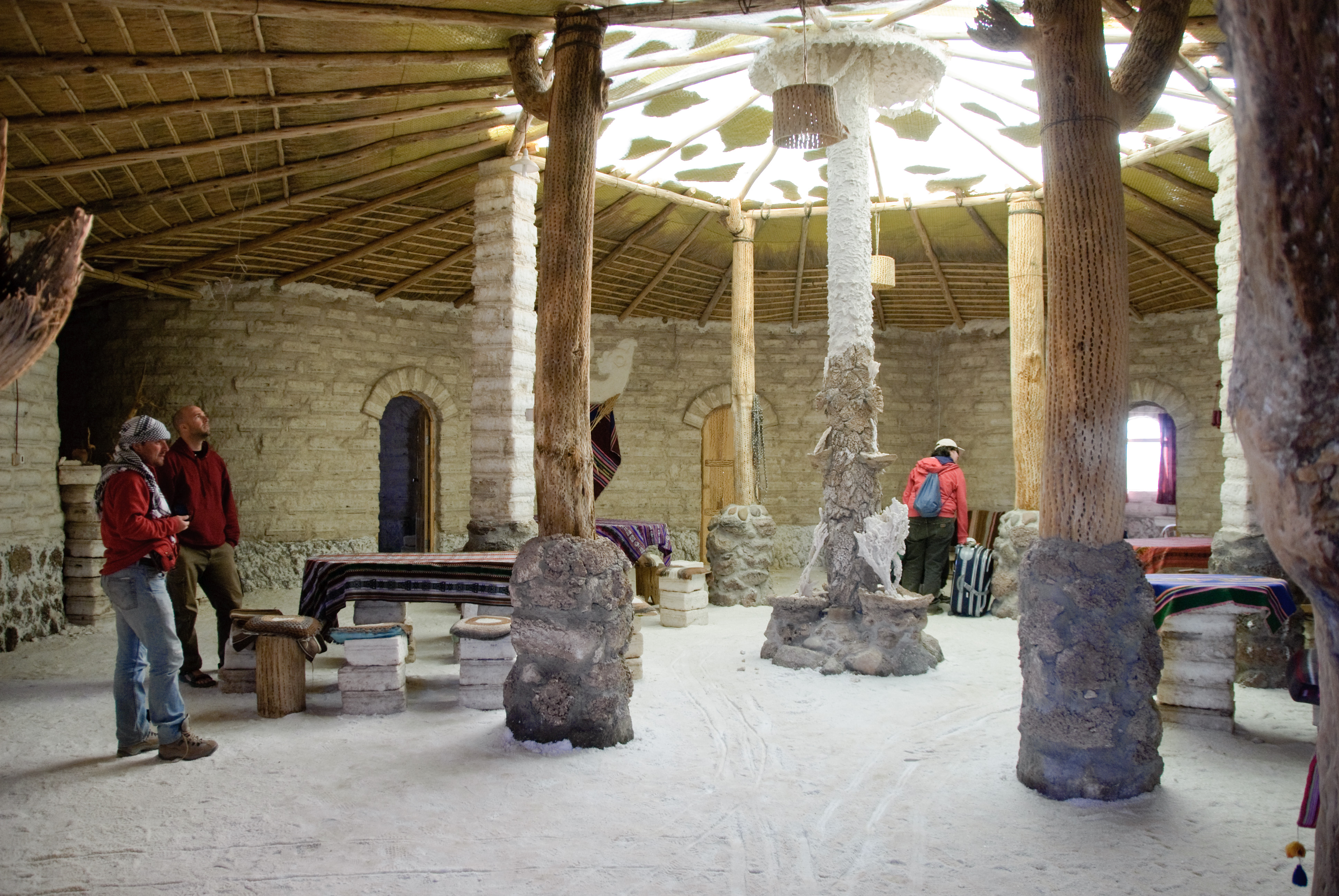
Inside of the Palacio de Sal hotel

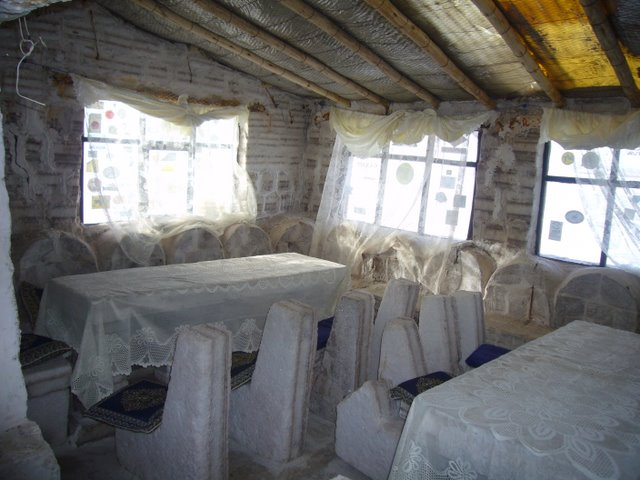
Dining area of the Palacio de Sal hotel

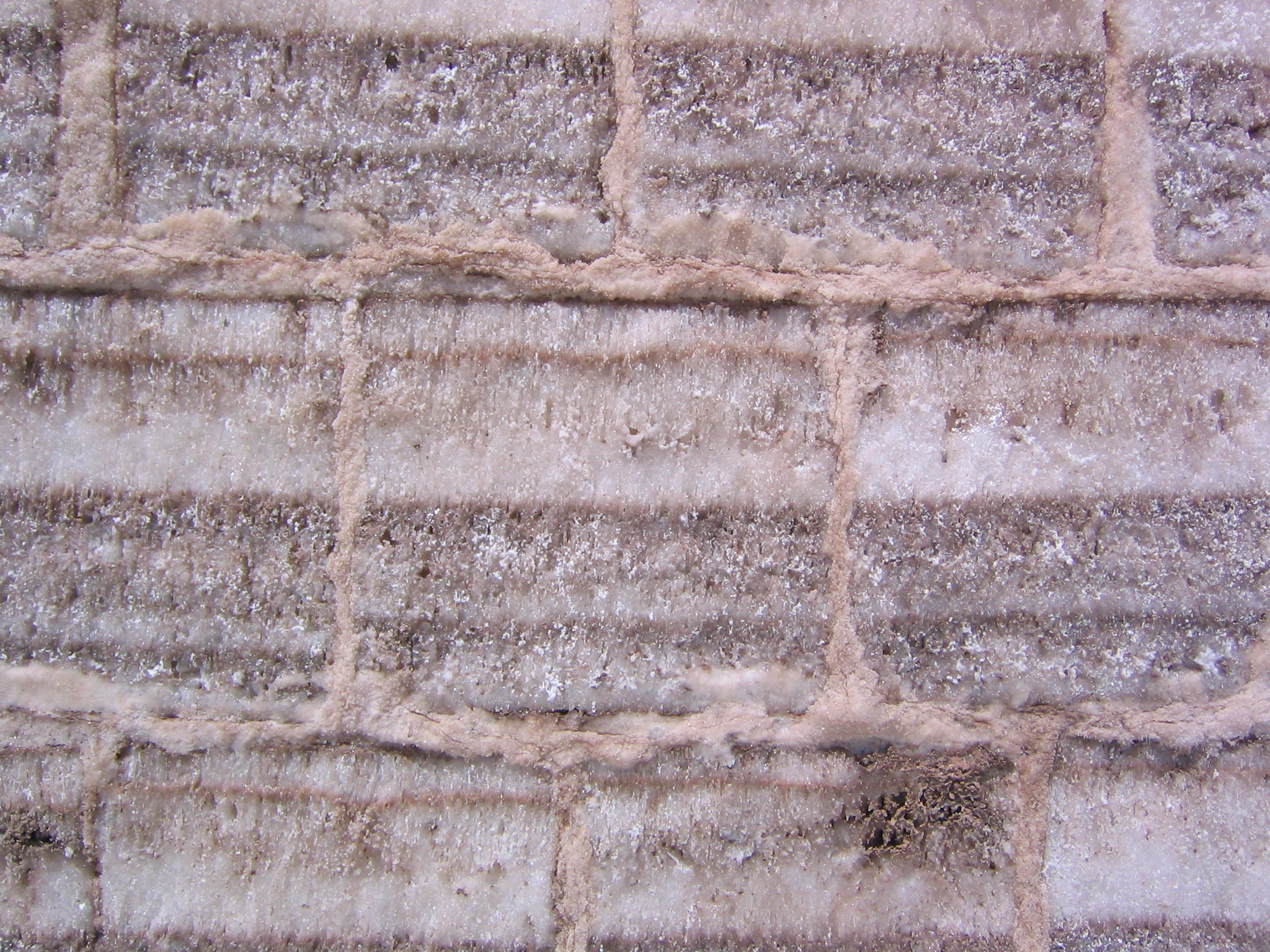
Solid salt bricks from Salar de Uyuni

Local architect Freddy Mamani designed an emerging architectural style known as the Neo-Andean architecture. In the exterior of the building, similar pigments match each other for a colourful effect, while large glass panels are placed on the exterior wall. For a high-altitude city consist of bare bricks and monochrome, this clearly attracts attention. The Neo-Andean architecture rejects the minimalist and Baroque style preferred by Western traditional architects and marks the “decolonization of symbolic order”. For Mamani, architecture can promote Bolivian culture, to show and maintain the roots and identity of Bolivians themselves.

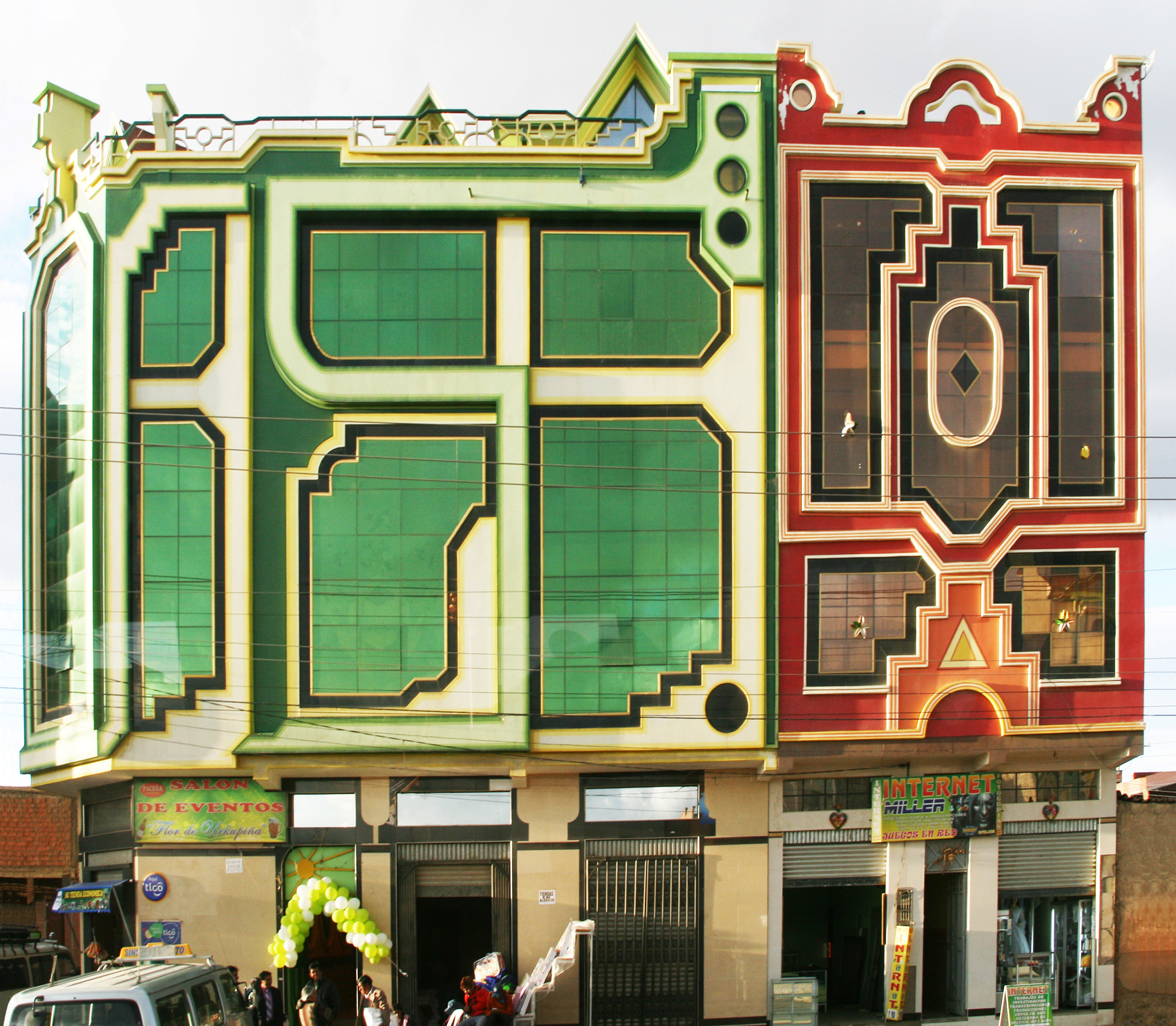
Neo-Andean architecture
