= Freddy Mamani (architect) =

Bolivian architect (born 1971)

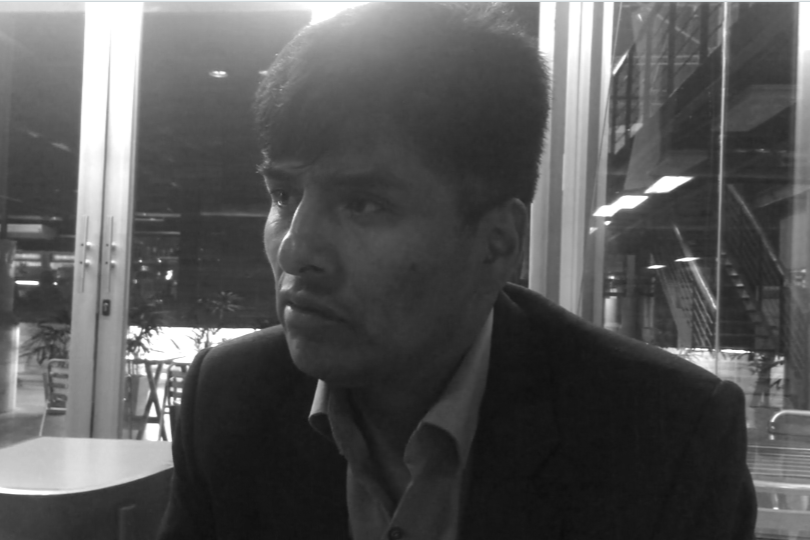
- Mamani in 2015
- Born: Freddy Mamani Silvestre; 1 November 1971 (age 54); Catavi, La Paz, Bolivia
- Occupation: Architect
- Practice: Neo-Andean

Freddy Mamani Silvestre (born 1 November 1971) is a Bolivian self-taught architect noted for his development of the Neo-Andean architectural style. His work is most associated with the city of El Alto and with the new social class of upwardly mobile indigenous Bolivians.

== Biography ==
Mamani was born in Catavi; his father was a bricklayer. They moved to El Alto while Freddy was at the age of six. He also followed his father's profession as a bricklayer. He had dreams of becoming an architect, but his work schedule would not permit him to attend whatever classes available in his local universities. Eventually, he instead received his degrees in civil construction and engineering from the Universidad Mayor de San Andres and Universidad Boliviana de Informática respectively.

== Work ==
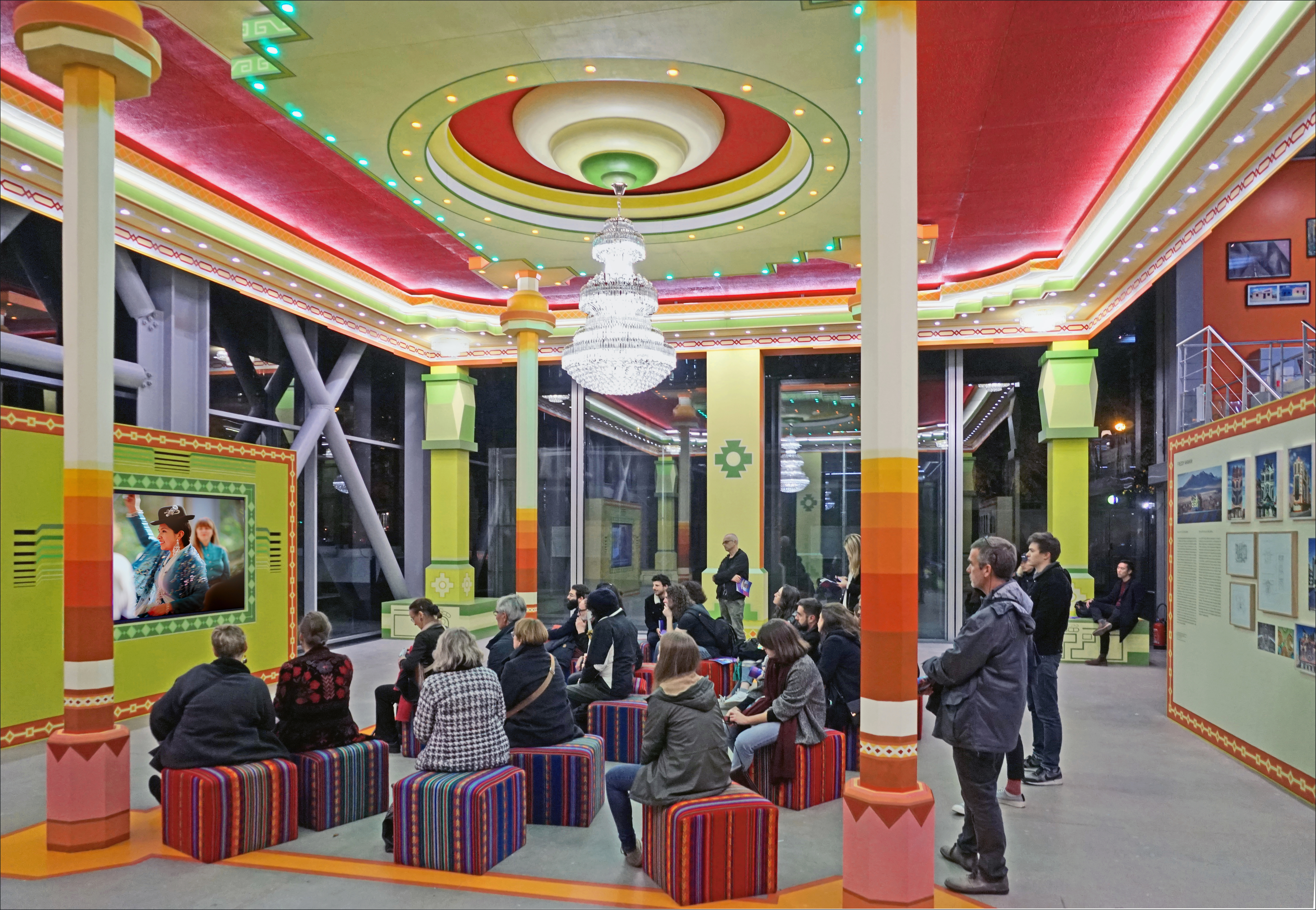
An event space designed by Mamani

His buildings are described as "la nueva arquitectura andina," or New Andean Architecture. In 2018, his buildings and work were featured in National Geographic, which said he was known as the "King of Andean Architecture." While lower levels of the buildings he designs often hold shops, the upper levels are often used as party spaces.

Regarding Mamani's architectural style, Italian architect Elisabetta Andreoli, author of "Andean Architecture of Bolivia", once explained that "some of the forms have been taken out of Andean art. The Tiwanacotas used a language of civilization in their forms: textiles, ceramics, and architectural ruins. Mamani uses the Andean cross, the diagonal juxtaposition of the planes, the duplicity, the repetition, the circle, which makes all this a stylisation theme, that is its source." Martha Moskowitz of Frederic Magazine wrote in April 2024 that he was inspired to some extent by stone carvings from the ancient city of Tiwanaku, with symbols such as the goddess Pachamama, the Andean cross, and the patterns of Chola dresses are also used, often in complex geometric shapes. He also draws from colors of the awayo shawls that indigenous Bolivian children are carried in by their mothers.

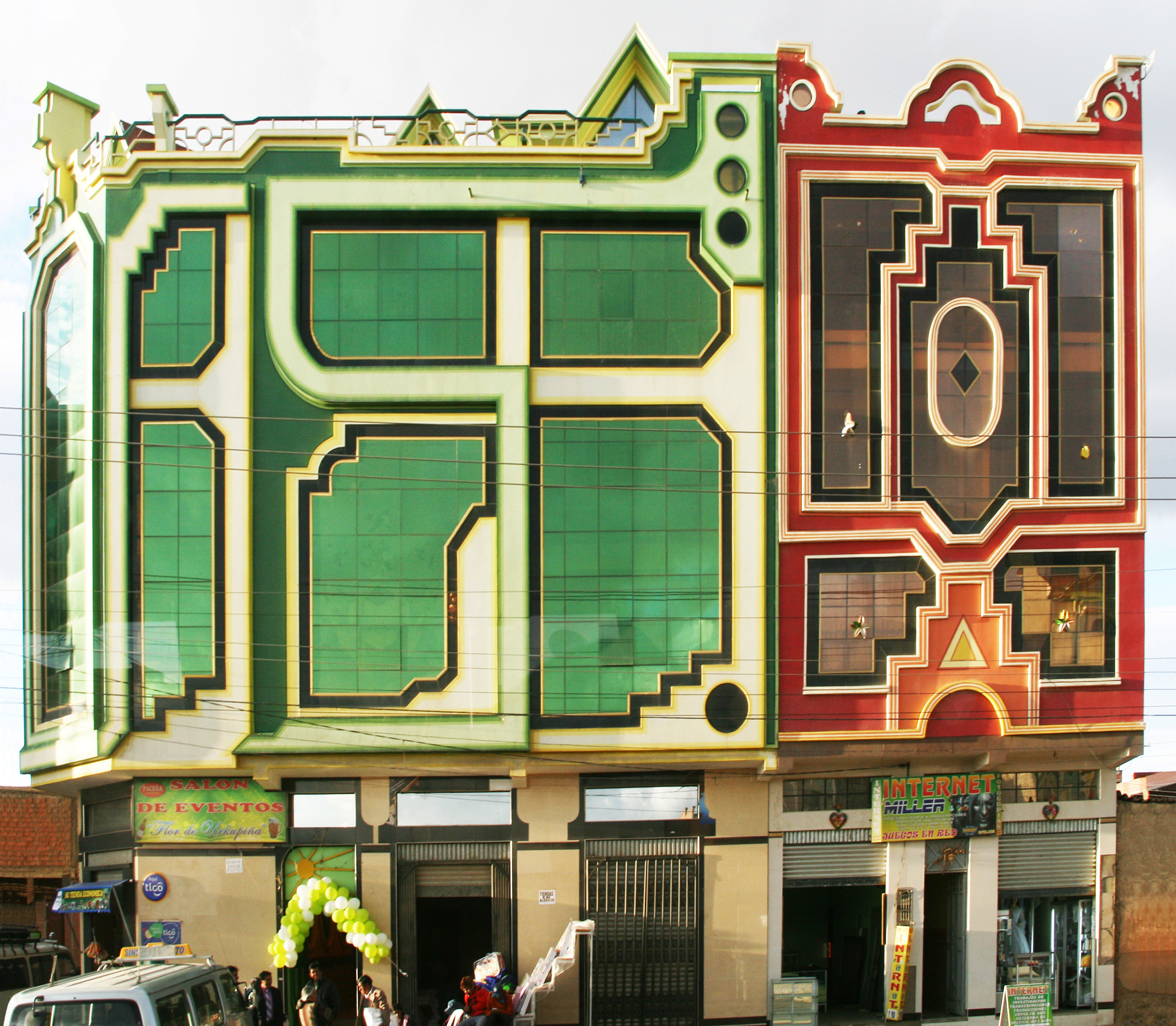
Neo-Andean architecture

== Mayoral candidacy ==
He ran for the 2026 mayoral election of El Alto under the Innovacíon Humana ("Human Innovation") party banner.
