= Neo-Andean =

Architectural style developed in Bolivia

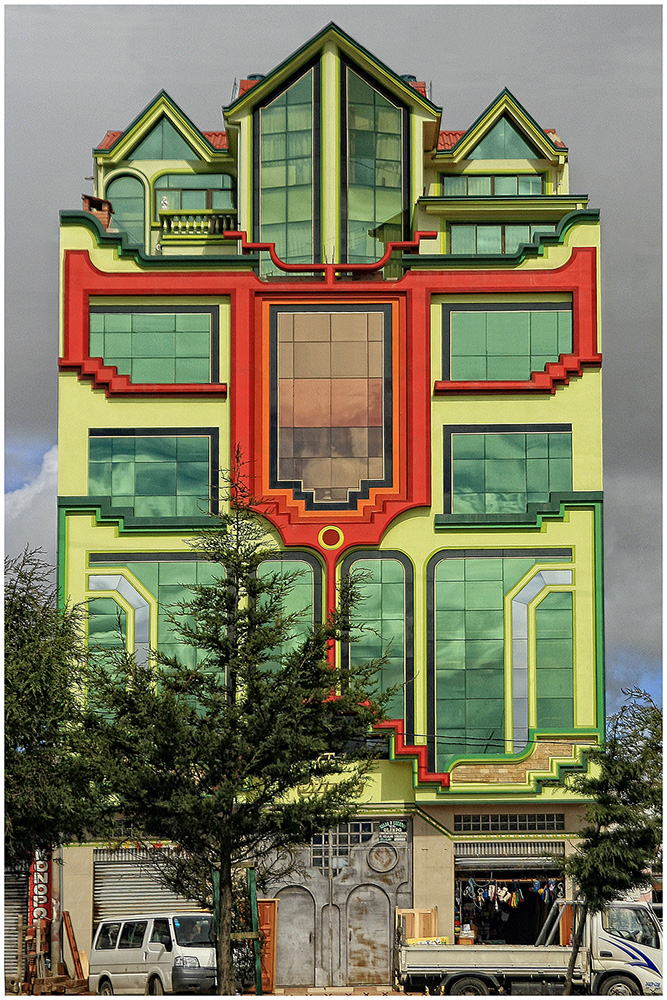
A cholet in El Alto, Bolivia.

Neo-Andean is a contemporary architectural movement primarily situated in El Alto, Bolivia, expressed in the city's many cholets (portmanteau of cholo and chalet), or mini-mansions, and dancehalls. Bolivian architect Freddy Mamani has been described as "the best-known architect" of neo-Andean architecture. Mamani is "a civil engineer who began as a simple laborer two decades ago"; his first building incorporating this style was commissioned by an Alteño businessman in 2002 which was finished in 2005, he has built over 60 similar structures around the city since.

Architecture historian Elisabetta Andreoli described the style, represented in over 100 structures across the El Alto skyline, as neo-Andean. Paola Flores noted that "most [of the neo-Andean structures] have been built since President Evo Morales, an Aymara who is the country's first indigenous leader, took office in 2006. Their emergence coincides with a modest economic boom coupled with a rise in Aymara pride." They also coincided with the rapid development and modernization of El Alto, a traditionally low-income area with many unpaved roads and improvised structures.

The bulk of the buildings in El Alto are simple, unadorned brick structures; Neo-Andean structures are typically similar in underlying structure, but with the addition of very elaborate decorative facades. These facades feature a harmony of cornered straight lines representing the masculine and curves representing the feminine prominent in Tiwanaku ruins known as the chacha-warmi; their colour palette often take on those of traditional Aymara fabrics. Many older buildings around El Alto have been renovated with neo-Andean style facades since the style became popular.

The term was first used in an architectural journal to reference the style of the United States Embassy building in Lima, Peru by Arquitectonica in 1996; it said that the embassy's architect "quite literally took inspiration from Peruvian history, modelling the base of the building on the structures of the ancient cities of Cuzco and Machu Picchu."

== Reception ==
Neo-Andean architecture has generally been received with praise from residents in El Alto. Paola Flores notes that Alteños, or residents of El Alto, "are generally pleased with their contribution to modern architecture," noting of a resident who stated "'To me, it's like a shout that says, 'Here we are! This is what we are!'" and another who remarked "'I am an Aymara woman, proud of my culture, happy and full of color. So why should my home not show what I am?'" The buildings were featured in Shine Heroes by Frederico Estol, a film about the thousands of shoeshiners of La Paz and El Alto.

The buildings have been described as "futuristic" and "funky" by outsiders to Andean culture.

== Gallery ==
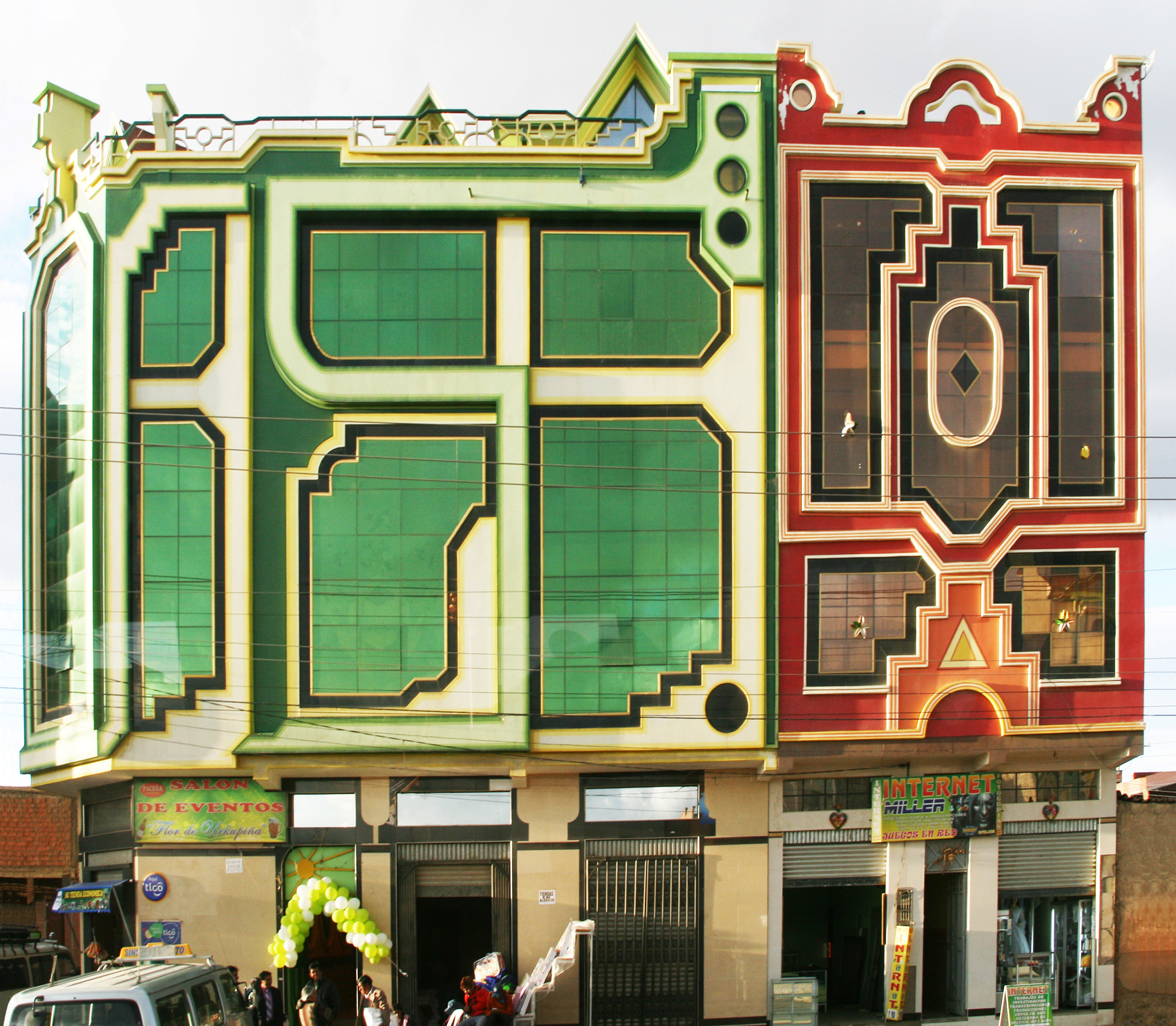

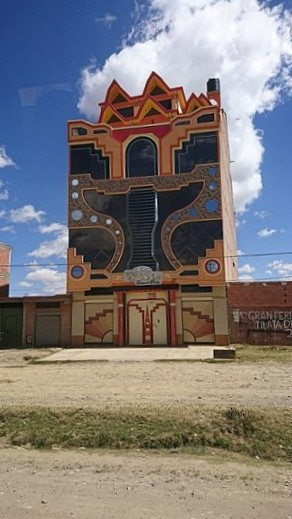

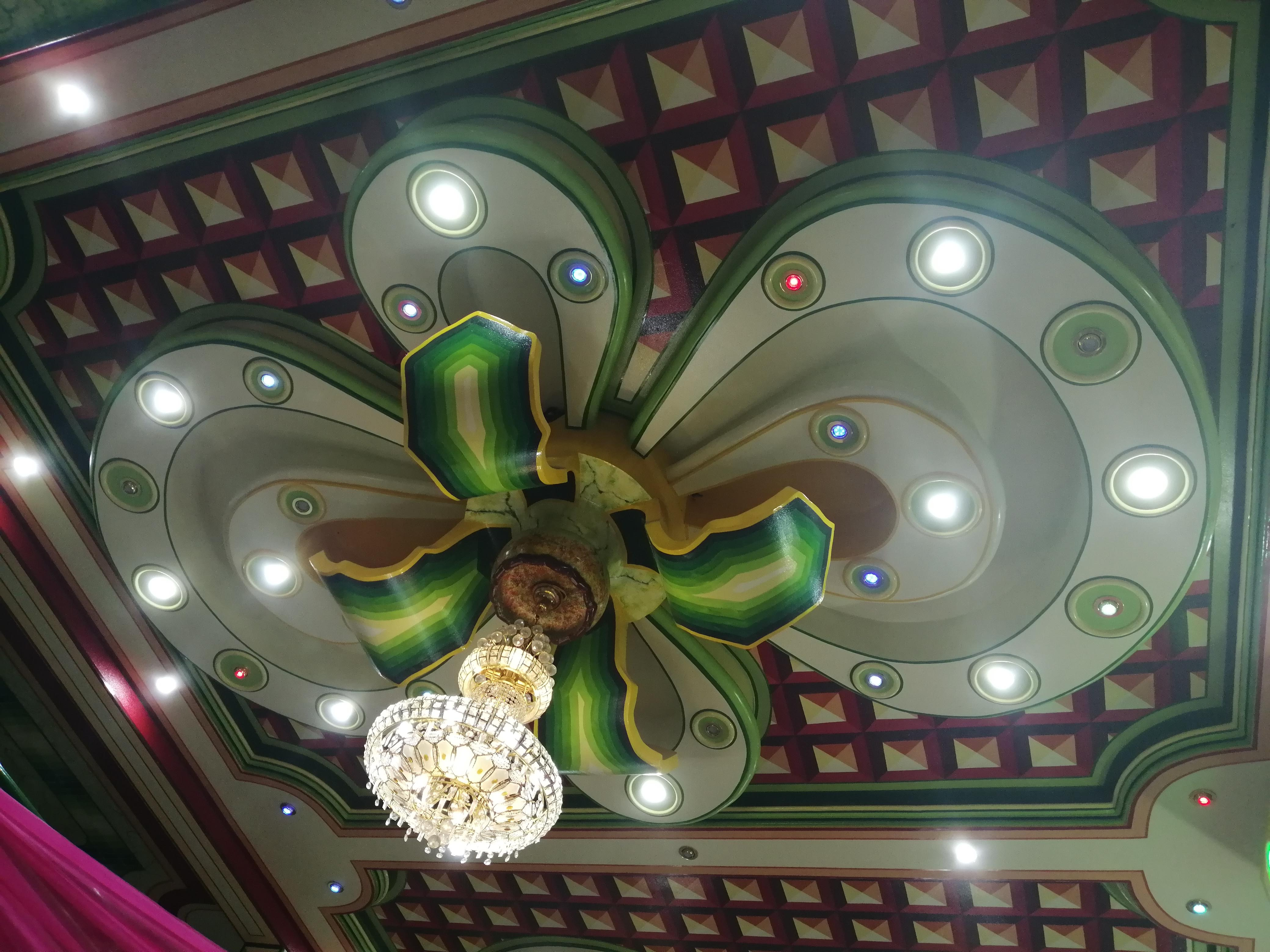

== See also ==
- Andean Baroque
- Mayan Revival architecture
