= Jamp'aturi =

Mountain in Bolivia

- Location within Bolivia

Highest point
- Elevation: 4,871 m (15,981 ft)
- Coordinates: 16°20′29″S 67°59′52″W

Geography
- Location: Bolivia, La Paz Department, Pedro Domingo Murillo Province, Sud Yungas Province
- Parent range: Andes, Cordillera Real

Jamp'aturi (Aymara jamp'atu frog, -ri or -iri a suffix, also spelled Jampaturi, Jamphaturi) is a 4,871-metre-high (15,981 ft) mountain in the Cordillera Real in the Andes of Bolivia. It is located in the La Paz Department, Pedro Domingo Murillo Province, La Paz Municipality, north-east of the city of La Paz. The mountains Mik'aya and Wak'ani are situated south-east of Jamp'aturi. The river Unduavi originates north-west of the mountain.

Jamp'aturi lies near the La Cumbre pass which connects La Paz and the Yungas.

== See also ==
- Ch'uñawi
- Inkachaka Dam
- Sirk'i Quta
