= Qutapata (Murillo) =

Mountain in Bolivia

- Location within Bolivia

Highest point
- Elevation: 5,288 m (17,349 ft)
- Coordinates: 16°25′46″S 67°58′18″W

Geography
- Location: Bolivia; La Paz Department, Murillo Province, La Paz Municipality
- Parent range: Andes, Cordillera Real

Qutapata (Aymara quta lake, pata step, also spelled Khotapata) is a 5,288-metre-high (17,349 ft) mountain in the Cordillera Real in the Bolivian Andes. It is situated in the La Paz Department, Murillo Province, La Paz Municipality, near the border with the Sud Yungas Province, Yanacachi Municipality. Qutapata lies south-west of the mountain Sirk'i Qullu, west of the mountain Jathi Qullu and south of the lake Sirk'i Quta.

The river Jathi Jawira (Hati Jahuira) originates between Jathi Qullu and Qutapata. It flows to the Pallquma River (Palcoma) in the south-west. Pallquma River is an affluent of Irpawi River (Irpavi), a tributary of the Choqueyapu River.
