= Yupampa Valencia =

- Location in Bolivia
- Coordinates: 16°40′40″S 68°1′26″W
- Country: Bolivia
- Department: La Paz Department
- Province: Pedro Domingo Murillo Province
- Municipality: Mecapaca Municipality
- Elevation: 9,450 ft (2,880 m)

Population (2012)
  - Total: 936
- Time zone: UTC-4 (BOT)

Yupampa Valencia is a village located in La Paz Department of Bolivia.
