= Churu Pata =

Mountain in Bolivia

- Location within Bolivia

Highest point
- Elevation: 4,460 m (14,630 ft)
- Coordinates: 16°17′42″S 67°58′21″W

Geography
- Location: Bolivia, La Paz Department
- Parent range: Andes

Churu Pata (Aymara churu a small waru waru; a lump, pata stone bench, step, also spelled Choro Pata) is a mountain in the Andes of Bolivia which reaches a height of approximately 4,460 m (14,630 ft). It is located in the La Paz Department, Murillo Province, La Paz Municipality. Churu Pata lies northwest of Chuqi Tanka and northeast of Ch'uñawi.
