= La Paz Municipality, Bolivia =

La Paz Municipality
- Municipality
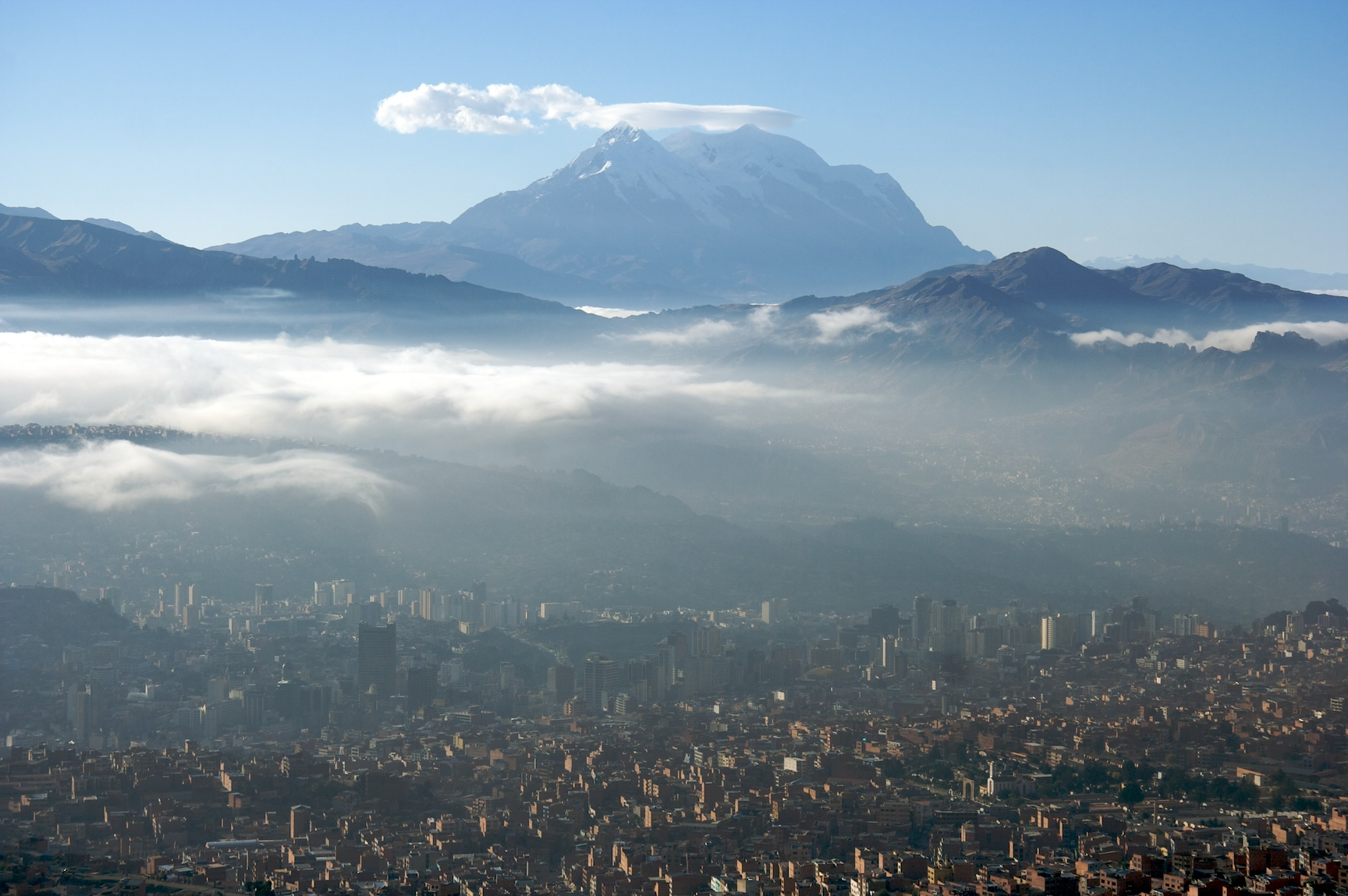
- La Paz with Illimani in the background

- Location of the La Paz Municipality within Bolivia
- Coordinates: 15°57′0″S 67°50′0″W
- Country: Bolivia
- Department: La Paz Department
- Province: Pedro Domingo Murillo Province
- Seat: La Paz

Government
  - Mayor: César Dockweiler

Area
  - Total: 762 sq mi (1,973 km^{2})
- Elevation: 11,800 ft (3,600 m)

Population (2024 census)
  - Total: 755,732
  - Density: 992.1/sq mi (383.0/km^{2})
- Time zone: UTC-4 (BOT)
- Website: http://www.lapaz.bo/

La Paz Municipality is the capital municipality (sección municipal capital) and one of the five municipalities of the Pedro Domingo Murillo Province in the La Paz Department in Bolivia. Its seat is La Paz.

== Geography ==
The Cordillera Real traverses the province. Some of the highest peaks of the municipality are listed below:

- Chankuni
- Chuqi Tanka
- Churu Pata
- Ch'alla Willk'i
- Ch'iyar Qirini
- Ch'uñawi
- Jach'a Chukita
- Jallayku
- Jamp'aturi
- Janq'u K'ark'a
- Jisk'a Chukita
- Jist'aña
- Kunturiri
- Llamp'u
- Llust'a
- Maman Quta
- Mik'aya
- Pukara
- Phisqa Quta
- Qala Wathiyani
- Qutapata
- Q'asiri
- Q'ulini
- Salla Jipiña
- Saltuni
- Sankayuni
- Sirk'i Qullu
- Taypi Qullu
- Tilata
- Turini
- Thipata
- Ullumani
- Uyu K'uchu
- Wak'ani
- Wila Jamach'ini
- Wila Lluxita
- Wisk'achani

== Places of interest ==
Some of the tourist attractions of the municipality are:

- Wayna Potosí, a mountain about 15 km north west of La Paz
- Qutapata National Park and Integrated Management Natural Area
- Abra de la Cumbre at a height of 4,650 m above sea level, the highest point on the route between La Paz and the Yungas
- K'ili K'ili viewpoint which presents a panoramic view of the city of La Paz
- Muela del Diablo ("Devil's Tooth"), a giant rock of about 150 m height that has the shape of a tooth
- Valle de la Luna ("Moon Valley"), south of La Paz city
- La Paz zoo "Vesty Pakos Sofra" with an area of 22.4 ha, the largest zoo in Bolivia, the second largest in South America and the highest in the world.
- Inkachaka Dam

== See also ==
- Laram Quta
- Sirk'i Quta
