= Salla Jipiña =

Mountain in Bolivia

- Location within Bolivia

Highest point
- Elevation: 4,944 m (16,220 ft)
- Coordinates: 16°21′52″S 68°03′21″W

Geography
- Location: Bolivia; La Paz Department
- Parent range: Andes, Cordillera Real

Salla Jipiña (Aymara salla rocks, cliffs, jipiña squatting of animals, also spelled Salla Jipina) is a 4,944-metre-high (16,220 ft) mountain in the Cordillera Real in the Bolivian Andes. It lies in the La Paz Department, Murillo Province, La Paz Municipality. Salla Jipiña is situated south-east of the mountains Ch'iyar Qirini and Chacaltaya.
