= Uyu K'uchu =

Mountain in Bolivia

- Location within Bolivia

Highest point
- Elevation: 4,800 m (15,700 ft)
- Coordinates: 16°9′35″S 68°11′25″W

Geography
- Location: Bolivia, La Paz Department
- Parent range: Andes, Cordillera Real

Uyu K'uchu (Aymara uyu corral, k'uchu, q'uch'u corner, "corral corner", also spelled Uyu Khuchu) is a mountain in the Cordillera Real in the Andes of Bolivia, about 4,800 metres (15,748 ft) high. It is situated in the La Paz Department, Murillo Province, La Paz Municipality. Uyu K'uchu lies south of the mountain Sankayuni and north-east of the mountain Kunturiri.
