= Ch'alla Willk'i (La Paz) =

Mountain in Bolivia

- Location within Bolivia

Highest point
- Elevation: 4,940 m (16,210 ft)
- Coordinates: 16°11′03″S 68°10′21″W

Geography
- Location: Bolivia; La Paz Department
- Parent range: Andes

Ch'alla Willk'i (Aymara ch'alla sand, willk'i gap, "sand gap", also spelled Challa Willkhi, Challo Willi) is a mountain in the Bolivian Andes, about 4,940 m (16,210 ft) high. It is situated in the La Paz Department, Murillo Province, La Paz Municipality, east of the main range of the Cordillera Real. Ch'alla Willk'i lies between Kunturiri in the southwest and Llust'a in the northeast, and northwest of Turini. A little river named Ch'iyar Jawira ("black river", Chias Jahuira) originates near the mountain. It flows to the northeast.
