= Mik'aya =

Mountain in Bolivia

- Mikhaya
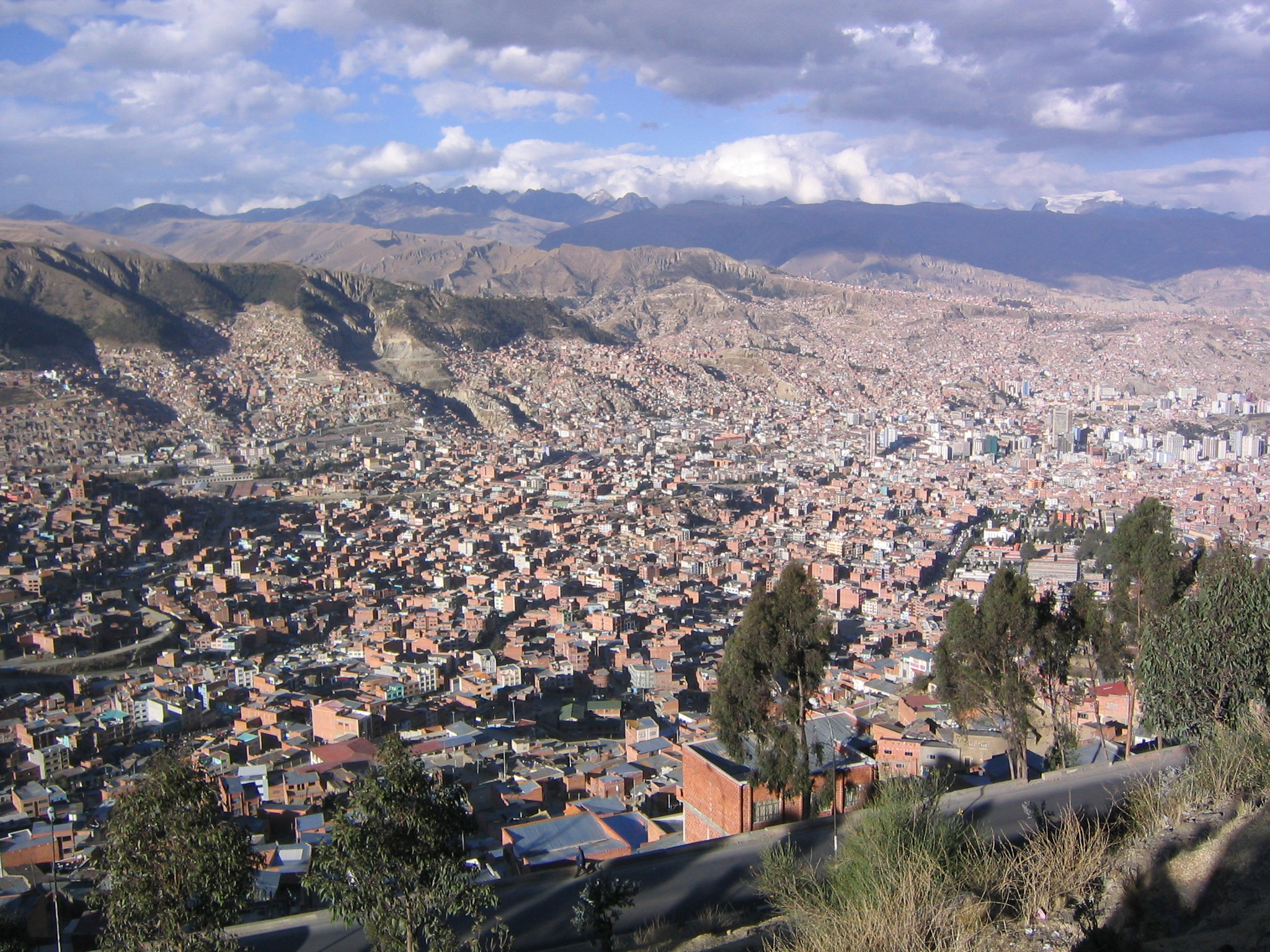
- A view of La Paz with the Cordillera Real in the background. Mik'aya lies in the sector shown in the upper left part of this image. Mururata is visible on the right.

Highest point
- Elevation: 5,342 m (17,526 ft)
- Coordinates: 16°21′59″S 67°56′09″W

Naming
- English translation: Abyss in the water
- Language of name: Aymara

Geography
- Location within Bolivia Location within South America
- Country: Bolivia
- State: La Paz Department
- Region: Sud Yungas Province
- Parent range: Andes, Cordillera Real
- Borders on: Pedro Domingo Murillo Province, La Paz Municipality, and the Sud Yungas Province, Yanacachi Municipality
- Mik'aya Lake
- Aymara: Laguna Mikhaya
- Location of Mik'aya in Bolivia
- Location: Bolivia, La Paz Department, Sud Yungas Province
- Coordinates: 16°21′45″S 67°57′19″W
- Primary inflows: Meltwater
- Surface elevation: 5,342 metres (17,526 ft)

Mik'aya (Aymara for abyss in the water, also spelled Mikhaya) is a 5,342-metre-high (17,526 ft) mountain in the Cordillera Real in the Andes of Bolivia. It is located in the La Paz Department at the border of the Pedro Domingo Murillo Province, La Paz Municipality, and the Sud Yungas Province, Yanacachi Municipality. Mik'aya lies north-east of the city of La Paz, south-east of the mountains Ch'uñawi and Wak'ani and north of the mountains Jathi Qullu and Sirk'i Qullu.

== Mik'aya lake and stream ==
Mik'aya is also the name of a small nearby lake and the name of a stream west of the mountain. The stream flows to the west along the lake Qhunqhu Wiqara (Kunco Huikara) and then to the south-west.

== See also ==
- Chacaltaya
- Inkachaka Dam
- Sirk'i Quta
- List of mountains in the Andes
