= Taypi Qullu (La Paz) =

Mountain in Bolivia

- Location within Bolivia

Highest point
- Elevation: 4,440 m (14,570 ft)
- Coordinates: 16°13′07″S 68°01′59″W

Geography
- Location: Bolivia; La Paz Department, Murillo Province
- Parent range: Andes

Taypi Qullu (Aymara taypi center, middle, qullu mountain, "center mountain", Hispanicized spelling Taypi Khollu) is a mountain in the Bolivian Andes, about 4,440 metres (14,567 ft) high. It is situated in the La Paz Department, Murillo Province, La Paz Municipality. Taypi Qullu lies south-east of the mountain Llamp'u.
