= Wila Lluxita (Murillo) =

Mountain in Bolivia

- Location within Bolivia

Highest point
- Elevation: 5,020 m (16,470 ft)
- Coordinates: 16°06′53″S 68°13′52″W

Geography
- Location: Bolivia, La Paz Department, Murillo Province
- Parent range: Andes, Cordillera Real

Wila Lluxita (Aymara wila red, blood, lluxi landslide, -ta a suffix, also spelled Wila Llojeta) is a mountain in the Cordillera Real in the Andes of Bolivia, about 5,020-metre (16,470 ft) high. It is situated in the La Paz Department, Murillo Province, La Paz Municipality, near the border with the Los Andes Province, Pucarani Municipality. Wila Lluxita lies south-west of the mountain Janq'u K'ark'a.

The river Wila Lluxita (Huila Llojeta) which later is called Sunqu (Zongo) originates south of the mountain. It flows to the east and then north-east.
