= Valle de las Ánimas =

Geological formation in Bolivia

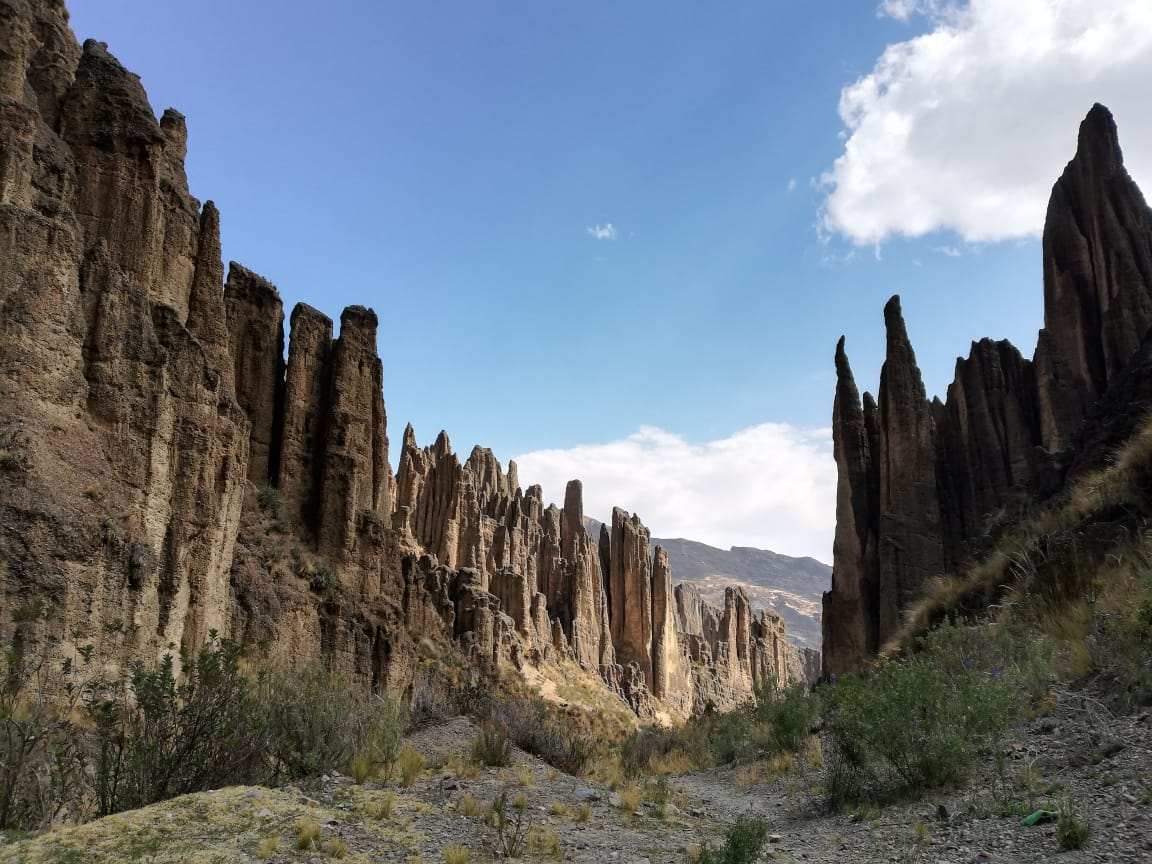
- Valle de las Ánimas

Geography
- Location: Pedro Domingo Murillo Province, La Paz Department, Bolivia
- Coordinates: 16°31′43″S 68°01′35″W
- Interactive map of Valle de las Ánimas

Valle de las Ánimas (Valley of the Souls) is a municipal protected area, natural departmental monument and geological formation of the city of La Paz, Bolivia, found a few kilometers away from the metropolitan area, at a height of 3965 meters above sea level.

== Toponomy ==
There are two possible explanations for the name: the first was referred by the locals who believe that the wind in the sector causes pitiful sounds passing through the formations, the second refers to the elongated nature of the formations, suggesting silhouettes of spirits.

== Geology ==
Specialists believe that these formations are closer to Palca Canyon, furrowed by a river with a variable channel, a product of the melting of existing glaciers that existed at the end of the planet's tertiary stage.

It has the appearance of stalagmites and has similarities with another zone of La Paz, Valle de la Luna.

== Access and activities ==
Access to the sector is made through the path to Uni, crossing through the zone of Apaña. The service does public transport.

In the sector, it offers hiking, climbing, photography and observation activities; due to its height at around 3900 meters above sea level, it enables a view of the city and the Illimani and Mururata mountains.

Nearby, there are pre-Hispanic ceremonial edifices which have been put at risk by the permanent development of unregulated urbanization by the municipal governments of La Paz and Palca.

== Legal protection ==
The area, in its protected and conserved state, is protected by the following norms:

- 1995: La Paz Municipal Resolution 450/95
- 1998: La Paz Municipal Resolution 081/98
- 2000: La Paz Municipal Ordinance 147/2000

== Gallery ==
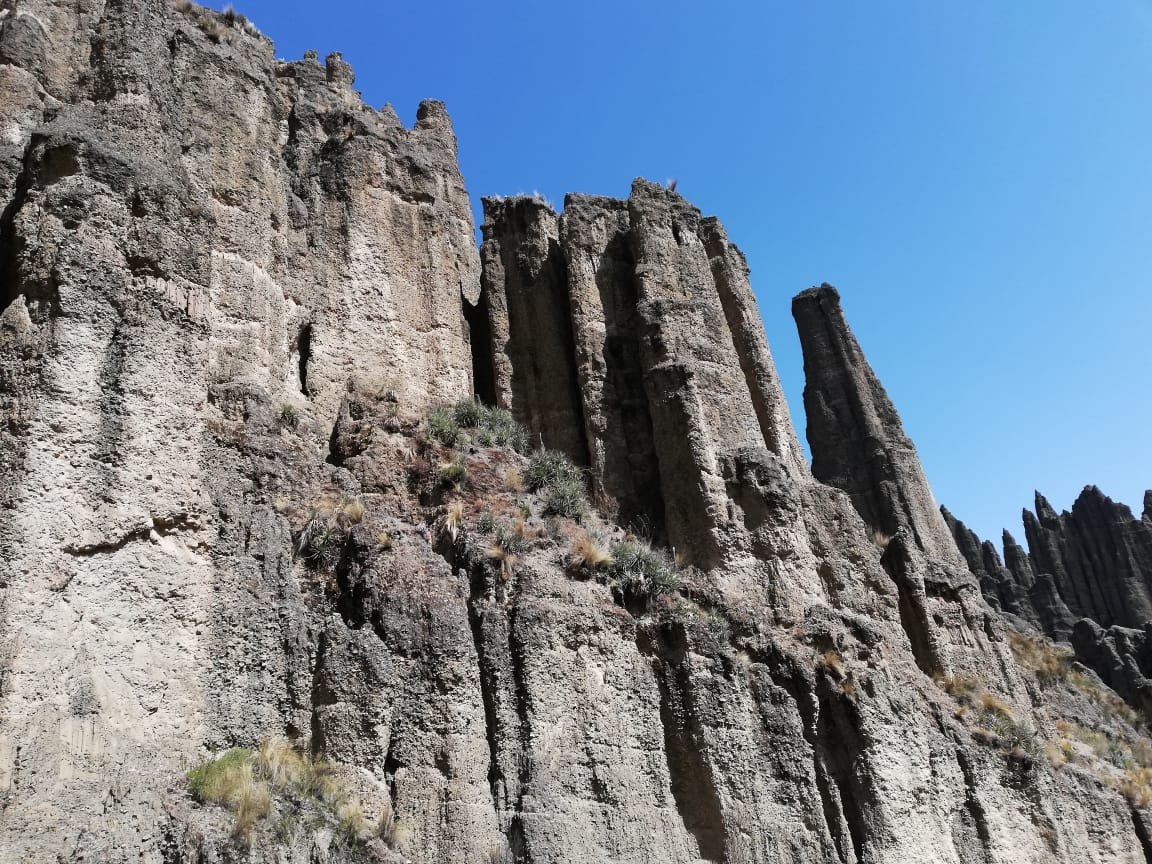

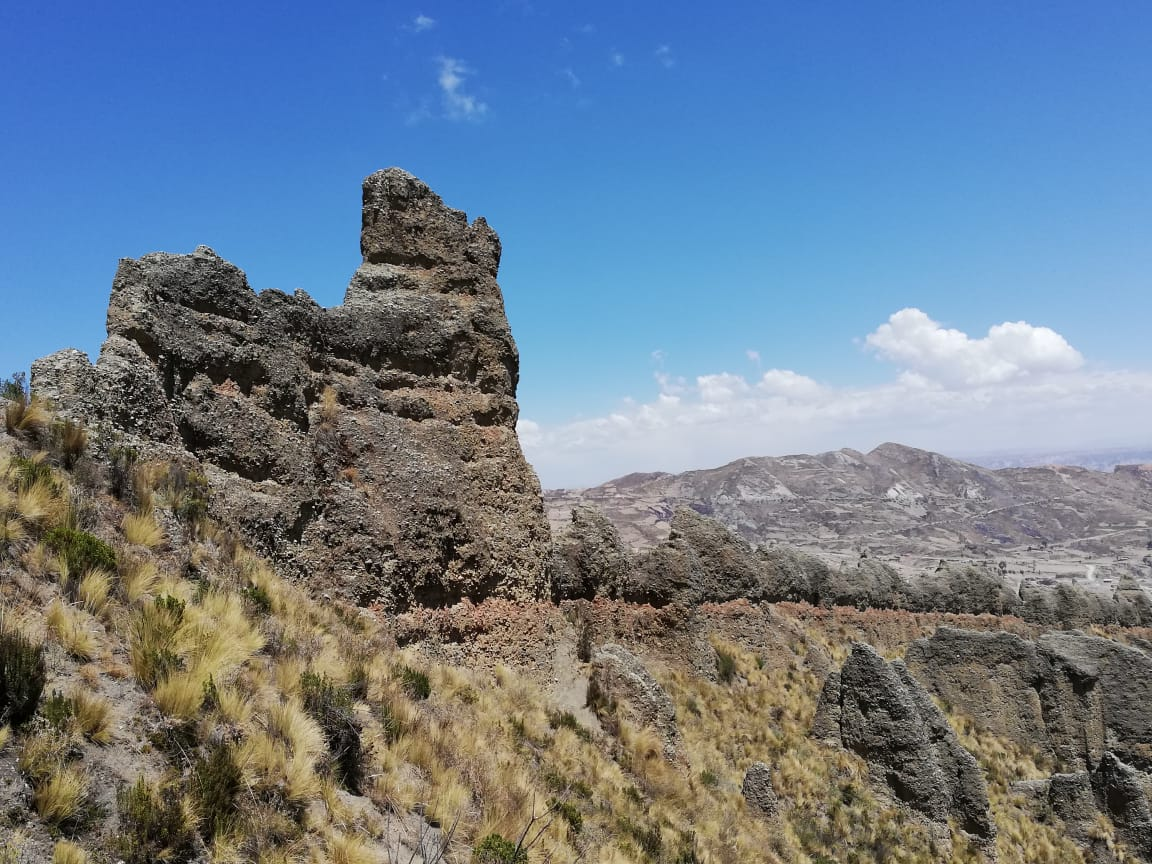

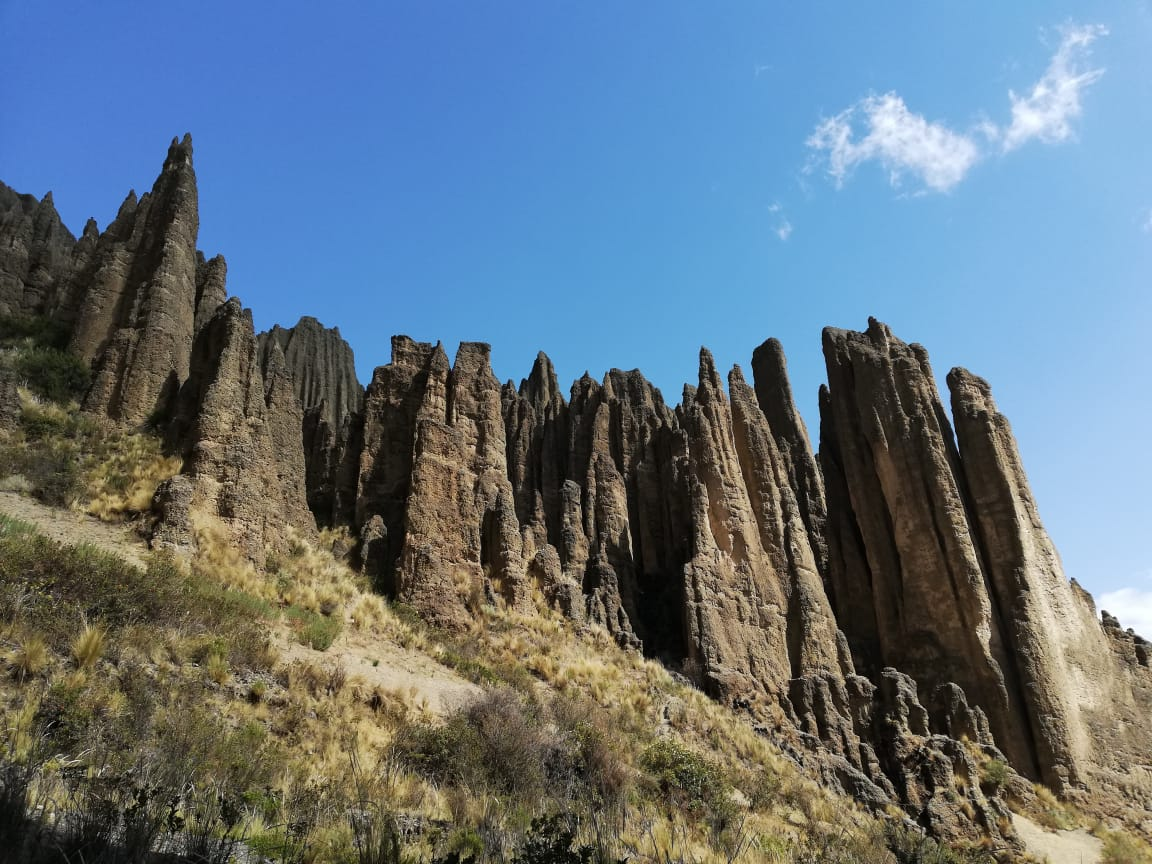

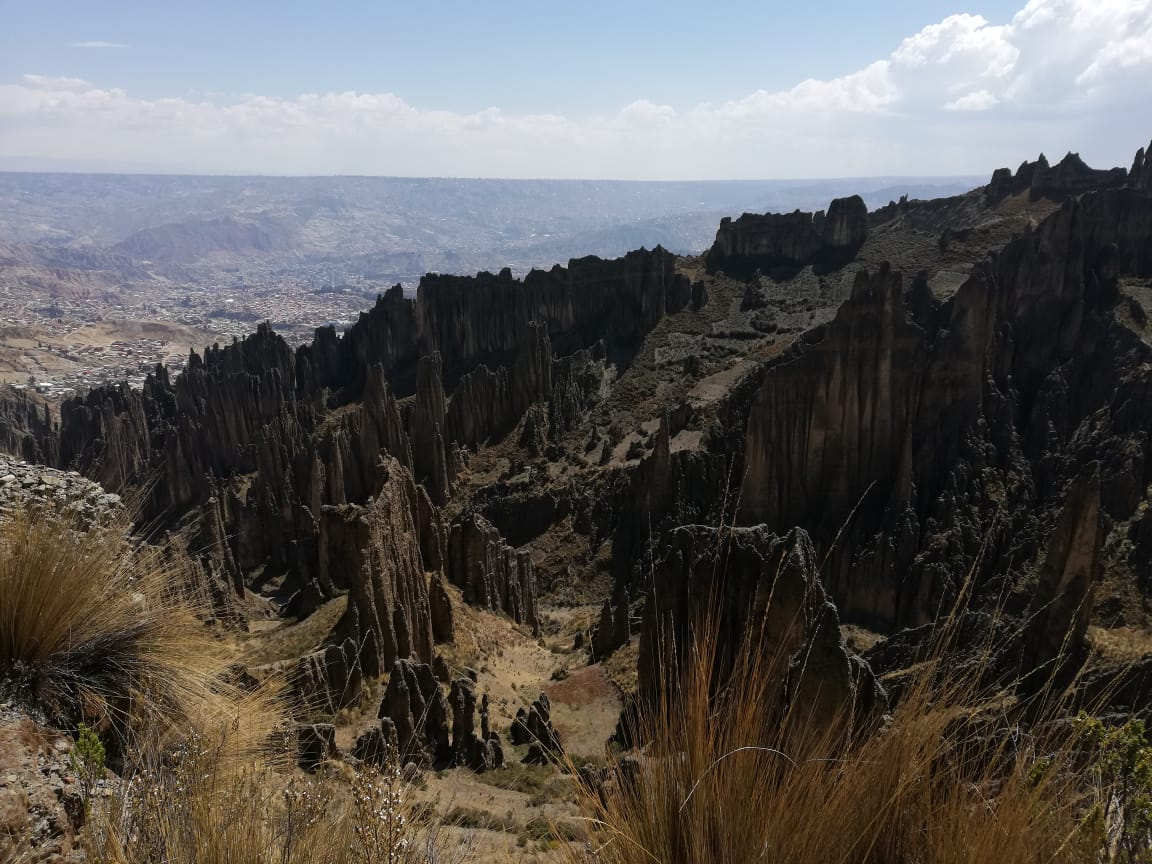

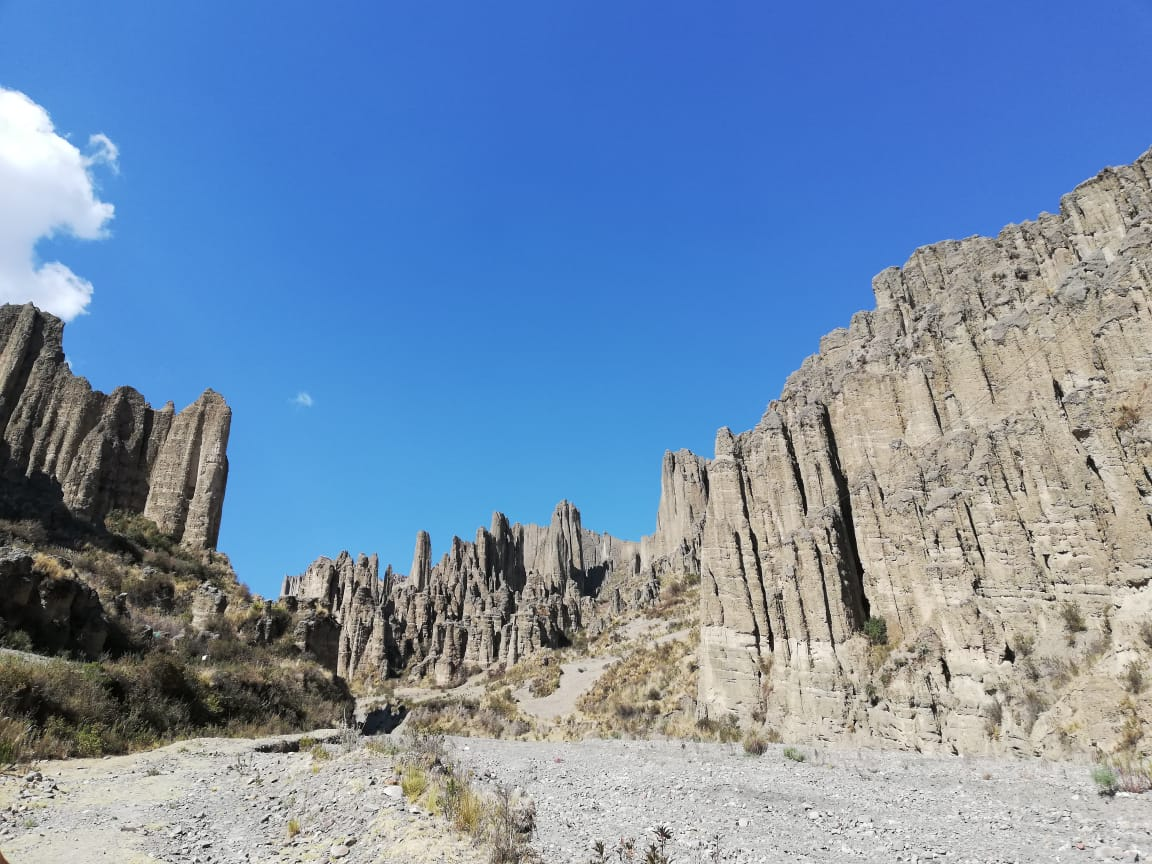

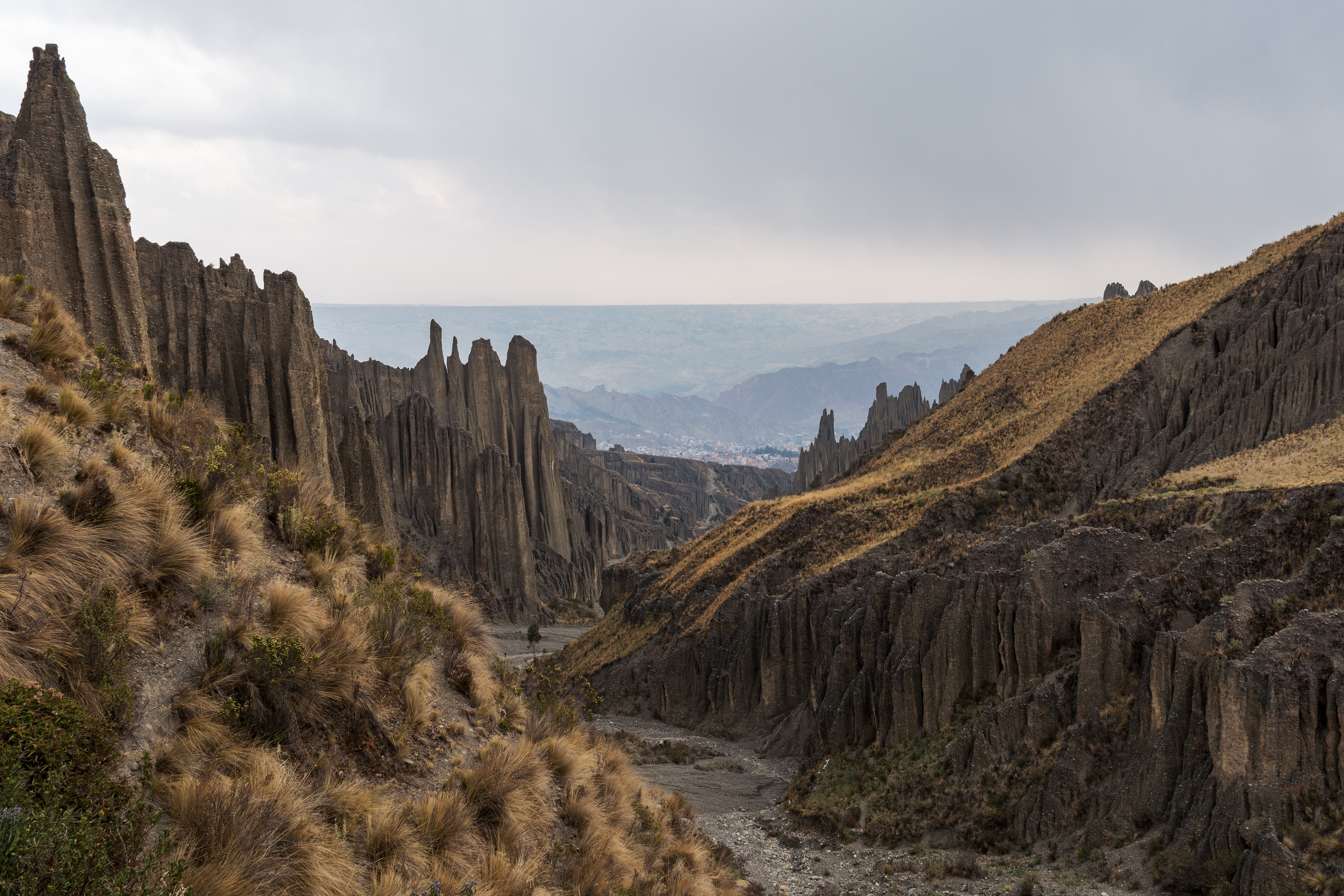
View of the city of La Paz from Valle de las Ánimas.

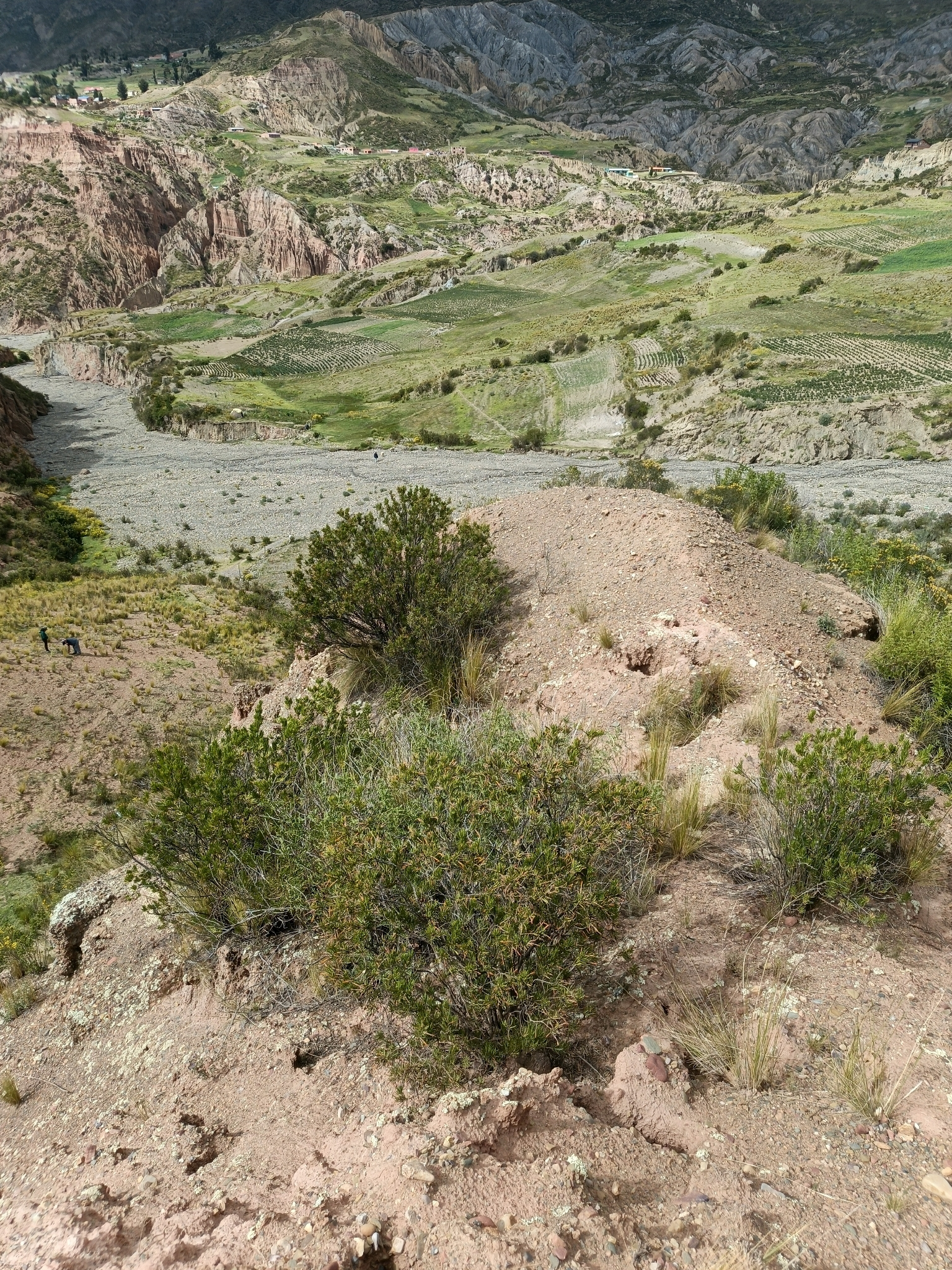
Mutisia orbignyana in the valley.

== See also ==
- Valle de la Luna (Bolivia)
