= Phisqa Quta =

Mountain in Bolivia

- Location within Bolivia

Highest point
- Elevation: 4,720 m (15,490 ft)
- Coordinates: 16°8′26″S 68°10′37″W

Geography
- Location: Bolivia, La Paz Department
- Parent range: Andes

Phisqa Quta (Aymara phisqa five, quta lake, "five lakes'", also spelled Pesca Kkota) is a mountain in the eastern extensions of the Cordillera Real in the Andes of Bolivia which reaches a height of approximately 4,720 m (15,490 ft). It is situated in the La Paz Department, Murillo Province, La Paz Municipality. Phisqa Quta lies southeast of Janq'u K'ark'a and Sankayuni.
