= Pukara (Murillo) =

Mountain in Bolivia

- Location within Bolivia

Highest point
- Elevation: 4,320 m (14,170 ft)
- Coordinates: 16°17′05″S 67°59′06″W

Geography
- Location: Bolivia, La Paz Department
- Parent range: Andes

Pukara (Aymara for fortress, also spelled Pucara) is a mountain in the Andes of Bolivia which reaches a height of approximately 4,320 m (14,170 ft). It is located in the La Paz Department, Murillo Province, La Paz Municipality. Pukara lies north of Ch'uñawi.
