= Wila Jamach'ini =

Mountain in Bolivia

- Location within Bolivia

Highest point
- Elevation: 4,420 m (14,500 ft)
- Coordinates: 16°10′24″S 68°04′24″W

Geography
- Location: Bolivia; La Paz Department, Murillo Province
- Parent range: Andes

Wila Jamach'ini (Aymara wila blood, blood-red, jamach'i bird, -ni a suffix to indicate ownership, "the red one with a bird (or birds)" or "the one with a red bird (or birds)", also spelled Wila Jamachini) is a mountain in the Bolivian Andes, about 4,420 metres (14,501 ft) high. It is situated in the La Paz Department, Murillo Province, La Paz Municipality. Wila Jamach'ini lies north-east of the mountain Llamp'u of the Cordillera Real.
