= Saltuni =

Mountain in Bolivia

- Location within Bolivia

Highest point
- Elevation: 5,284 m (17,336 ft)
- Coordinates: 16°14′12″S 68°10′57″W

Geography
- Location: Bolivia; La Paz Department
- Parent range: Andes, Cordillera Real

Saltuni is a 5,284-metre-high (17,336 ft) mountain in the Cordillera Real in the Bolivian Andes. It is situated in the La Paz Department, Murillo Province, La Paz Municipality, near the border with the Los Andes Province, Pucarani Municipality. Saltuni lies southwest of Jach'a Chukita and south of Jisk'a Chukita. A little lake name Janq'u Quta (Aymara for "white lake") lies at its feet, south of it.
