= Turini (Murillo) =

Mountain in Bolivia

- Location within Bolivia

Highest point
- Elevation: 4,300 m (14,100 ft)
- Coordinates: 16°07′46″S 68°09′37″W

Geography
- Location: Bolivia, La Paz Department
- Parent range: Andes

Turini (Aymara turi tower, -ni a suffix, "the one with a tower", also spelled Turrini) is a mountain in the eastern extensions of the Cordillera Real in the Andes of Bolivia which reaches a height of approximately 4,300 m (14,100 ft). It is situated in the La Paz Department, Murillo Province, La Paz Municipality. Turini lies northeast of Phisqa Quta.
