= 1969 La Paz Lloyd Aéreo Boliviano Douglas DC-6 crash =

1969 aviation accident

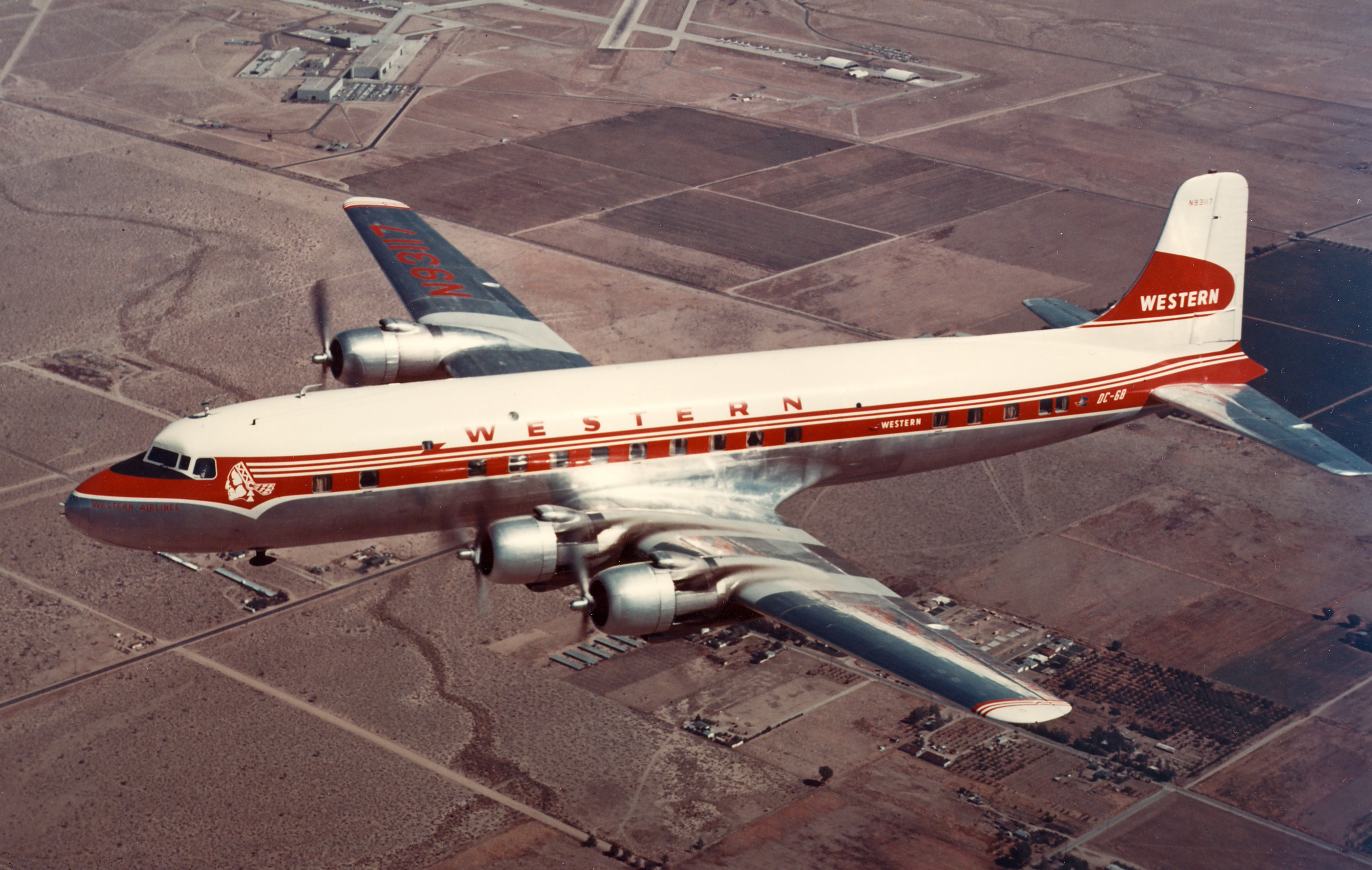
- A Western Airlines DC-6B, similar to the aircraft involved in the accident.

Accident
- Date: 26 September 1969
- Summary: Cause unknown; possible controlled flight into terrain
- Site: Mount Choquetanga, 176 km (110 miles) southeast of La Paz, Bolivia

Aircraft
- Aircraft type: Douglas DC-6B
- Operator: Lloyd Aéreo Boliviano
- Registration: CP-698
- Flight origin: Santa Cruz-El Trompillo Airport (SRZ/SLET), Bolivia
- Destination: La Paz-El Alto Airport (LPB/SLLP), Bolivia
- Occupants: 74
- Passengers: 69
- Crew: 5
- Fatalities: 74
- Survivors: 0

The 1969 La Paz Lloyd Aéreo Boliviano Douglas DC-6 crash, also known as the Viloco tragedy, was an accident involving a Douglas DC-6B of the Bolivian airline Lloyd Aéreo Boliviano that collided with Mount Choquetanga, 176 km (110 miles) southeast of La Paz, Bolivia, on 26 September 1969, killing all 74 people on board, including 17 members of a Bolivian association football team named The Strongest.

== Accident ==
The Lloyd Aéreo Boliviano Douglas DC-6B took off from Santa Cruz-El Trompillo Airport, Bolivia on a scheduled flight to La Paz-El Alto Airport, Bolivia carrying 5 crew and 69 passengers, including 17 members of a Bolivian football team named The Strongest, on 26 September 1969. The flight was under the command of Captain Teddy Scott Villa, age 39, First Officer Alberto Estrugo, 31, and Radio Operator Germán Guzmán, with flight attendants Carlos Fiorilo and Rosario Vergara in the cabin. Around 3.10pm while cruising at an altitude of 15,500 ft (4,724 m), the plane crashed into a slope of Mount Choquetanga, 176 km (110 miles) southeast of La Paz, Bolivia. The wreckage was found after a three day search where it was also discovered that there were no survivors.

== Aircraft ==
The Douglas DC-6B involved, CP-698 (msn 43273/191) was built in 1951 and was used by Lloyd Aéreo Boliviano from 1951 until its destruction in 1969.

== Aftermath ==
The aircraft was destroyed in the crash killing all 74 people on board including the seventeen Bolivian football players. Their deaths caused the event to become known as the Viloco tragedy. An investigation of the accident did not reveal any reason or clues as to why the plane crashed, although it was speculated that there was a possibility of controlled flight into terrain due to possible weather conditions and poor visibility.

== See also ==
- List of accidents involving sports teams
