= Q'ulini (Bolivia) =

Mountain in Bolivia

- Location within Bolivia

Highest point
- Elevation: 4,968 m (16,299 ft)
- Coordinates: 16°18′57″S 68°02′53″W

Geography
- Location: Bolivia; La Paz Department, Murillo Province
- Parent range: Andes, Cordillera Real

Q'ulini (Aymara q'uli stripes of different colors on the shirt or undershirt which the Andean people wear, -ni a suffix to indicate ownership, "the one with stripes", also spelled Kolini) is a 4,968-metre-high (16,299 ft) mountain in the Cordillera Real in the Bolivian Andes. It is located in the La Paz Department, Murillo Province, La Paz Municipality. Q'ulini is situated southeast of the mountain Qala Uyu (Khala Huyo). It lies northeast of the lake Laram Quta at the wetlands known as Pampa Larama (Pampalarama, Pamparalama).
