= Thipata =

Mountain in Bolivia

- Location within Bolivia

Highest point
- Elevation: 5,045 m (16,552 ft)
- Coordinates: 16°13′54″S 68°12′35″W

Geography
- Location: Bolivia; La Paz Department, Murillo Province, La Paz Municipality
- Parent range: Andes, Cordillera Real

Thipata is a 5,045-metre-high (16,552 ft) mountain in the Cordillera Real in the Bolivian Andes. It is situated in the La Paz Department, Los Andes Province, Pucarani Municipality. Thipata lies northwest of Saltuni and northeast of Mulamaniya. Ch'iyar Quta Jawira (Aymara for "black lake river", also spelled Chiar Khota Jahuira) flows along its northern slopes.
