= Wisk'achani (Murillo) =

Mountain in Bolivia

- Location within Bolivia

Highest point
- Elevation: 4,940 m (16,210 ft)
- Coordinates: 16°11′18″S 68°06′29″W

Geography
- Location: Bolivia; La Paz Department, Murillo Province
- Parent range: Andes, Cordillera Real

Wisk'achani (Aymara wisk'acha a rodent, -ni a suffix to indicate ownership, "the one with the viscacha", Hispanicized spelling Viscachani) is a mountain in the Cordillera Real in the Bolivian Andes, about 4,940-metre (16,207 ft) high. It is located in the La Paz Department, Murillo Province, La Paz Municipality. Wisk'achani is situated north-west of the mountain Llamp'u. The lake Wisk'achani (Viscachani) lies at its feet, south-west of it.
