= 1582 Ancuancu earthquake =

Coordinates: 16.568992°S 68.162713°W

On April 2, 1582, Ancuancu (in present-day La Paz Department, Bolivia) was struck by an earthquake, that reportedly buried all of the inhabitants except for one chief who reportedly lost the ability to speak. In the place where the village had stood, the Jacha Kalla (Achocalla) valley was formed as a result of the earthquake.
