= P'iq'iñ Q'ara (Mecapaca) =

Mountain in Bolivia

- Location within Bolivia

Highest point
- Elevation: 4,283 m (14,052 ft)
- Coordinates: 16°46′51″S 67°59′49″W

Geography
- Location: Bolivia, La Paz Department, Murillo Province
- Parent range: Andes

P'iq'iñ Q'ara (Aymara p'iq'iña head, q'ara bare, bald, p'iq'iña q'ara bald, "baldheaded", also spelled Pequen Khara, Phequen Khara) is a 4,283-metre-high (14,052 ft) mountain in the Andes of Bolivia. It is situated in the La Paz Department, Murillo Province, Mecapaca Municipality.
