= Mecapaca =

- Town
- Location within Bolivia
- Coordinates: 16°40′00″S 68°01′00″W
- Country: Bolivia
- Department: La Paz Department
- Province: Pedro Domingo Murillo Province
- Municipality: Mecapaca Municipality

Population (2001)
  - Total: 251
- Time zone: UTC-4 (BOT)
- Climate: Cwb

Mecapaca is a location in the La Paz Department in western Bolivia. It is the administrative seat of the Mecapaca Municipality, the second municipal section of the Pedro Domingo Murillo Province.
