= Sirk'i Qullu =

Mountain in Bolivia

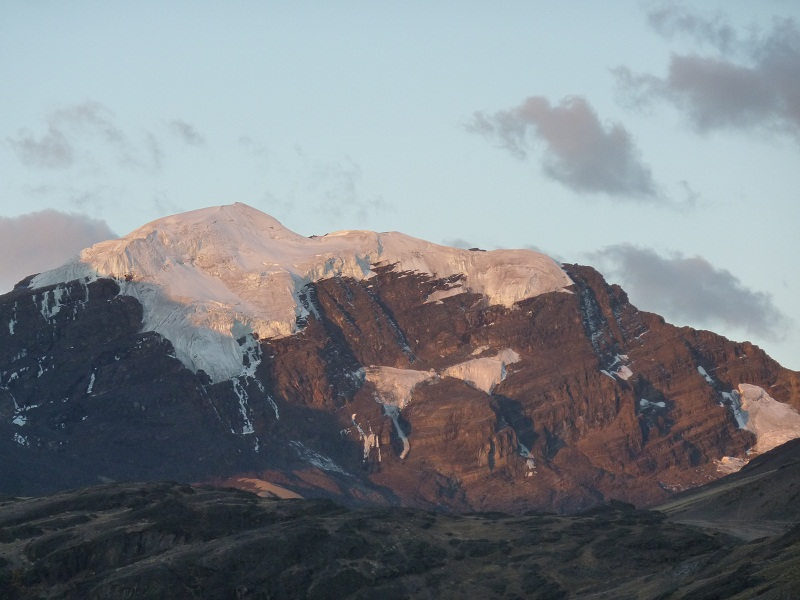

Highest point
- Elevation: 5,546 m (18,196 ft)
- Coordinates: 16°23′32″S 67°56′27″W

Geography
- Location within Bolivia
- Location: Bolivia, La Paz Department, Pedro Domingo Murillo Province, La Paz Municipality
- Parent range: Andes, Cordillera Real

Climbing
- First ascent: unknown

Sirk'i Qullu (Aymara sirk'i wart, qullu mountain, "wart mountain", also spelled Serkhe Kkollu, Serkhe Khollu, Serkhe Kollu, Serque Qollu) is a mountain in the Cordillera Real in the Andes of Bolivia, about 5,546 m (18,196 ft) high. It is located in the La Paz Department, at the border of the Pedro Domingo Murillo Province, La Paz Municipality, and the Sud Yungas Province, Yanacachi Municipality. Sirk'i Qullu lies north-east of the city of La Paz, north of the mountain Jathi Qullu and south of the mountains Wak'ani and Mik'aya.

== See also ==
- Inkachaka Dam
- Mururata
- Sirk'i Quta
- Sura Qullu
- List of mountains in the Andes
