= Qala Wathiyani =

Mountain in Bolivia

- Location within Bolivia

Highest point
- Elevation: 4,794 m (15,728 ft)
- Coordinates: 16°13′10″S 68°08′42″W

Geography
- Location: Bolivia; La Paz Department, Murillo Province
- Parent range: Andes, Cordillera Real

Qala Wathiyani (Aymara qala stone, wathiya decoction of a dish on a stone oven, -ni a suffix to indicate ownership, also spelled Khala Bateani) is a 4,794-metre-high (15,728 ft) mountain in the Cordillera Real in the Bolivian Andes. It is located in the La Paz Department, Murillo Province, La Paz Municipality. Qala Wathiyani is situated northwest of the peak of Maman Quta.
