= Maman Quta =

Mountain in Bolivia

- Location within Bolivia

Highest point
- Elevation: 5,160 m (16,930 ft)
- Coordinates: 16°13′50″S 68°08′21″W

Geography
- Location: Bolivia; La Paz Department, Murillo Province, La Paz Municipality
- Parent range: Andes, Cordillera Real

Maman Quta (Aymara mamani falcon, hawk, quta lake, "falcon lake", Hispanicized spelling Maman Khota, Maman Kkota) is a mountain in the Cordillera Real in the Bolivian Andes, about 5,160 metres (16,929 ft) high. It is situated in the La Paz Department, Murillo Province, La Paz Municipality. Mama Quta lies southeast of Qala Wathiyani.
