= Jisk'a Chukita =

Mountain in Bolivia

- Location within Bolivia

Highest point
- Elevation: 4,980 m (16,340 ft)
- Coordinates: 16°12′40″S 68°10′54″W

Geography
- Location: Bolivia; La Paz Department, Murillo Province, La Paz Municipality
- Parent range: Andes, Cordillera Real

Jisk'a Chukita (Aymara jisk'a little, chukiña to plow for sowing, -ta a suffix, "little plowed (mountain)", also spelled Jiskha Choqueta) is a mountain in the Cordillera Real in the Bolivian Andes, about 4,980 m (16,339 ft) high. It is situated in the La Paz Department, Murillo Province, La Paz Municipality. Jisk'a Chukita lies northwest of Jach'a Chukita and southeast of Kunturiri. Ch'iyar Quta Jawira (Aymara for "black lake river", also spelled Chiar Khota Jahuira) flows along its northern slopes.
