= Wak'ani =

Mountain in Bolivia

- Location within Bolivia

Highest point
- Elevation: 5,321 m (17,457 ft)
- Coordinates: 16°20′59″S 67°56′39″W

Geography
- Location: Bolivia, La Paz Department, Pedro Domingo Murillo Province, Sud Yungas Province
- Parent range: Andes, Cordillera Real

Wak'ani (Aymara wak'a girdle, -ni a suffix to indicate ownership, "the one with a girdle", Hispanicized spelling Huacani) is a mountain in the Cordillera Real in the Andes of Bolivia, 5,321 metres (17,457 ft) high. It is located in the La Paz Department at the border of the Pedro Domingo Murillo Province, La Paz Municipality, and the Sud Yungas Province, Yanacachi Municipality. Wak'ani lies north-east of the city of La Paz, north to north-west of the mountains Jathi Qullu, Sirk'i Qullu and Mik'aya.

== See also ==
- Chacaltaya
- Inkachaka Dam
- Mururata
- Sirk'i Quta
- Sura Qullu
- List of mountains in the Andes
