= Chankuni =

Mountain in Bolivia

- Location within Bolivia

Highest point
- Elevation: 4,638 m (15,217 ft)
- Coordinates: 16°8′22″S 68°9′54″W

Geography
- Location: Bolivia, La Paz Department, Murillo Province, La Paz Municipality
- Parent range: Andes, Cordillera Real

Chankuni (Aymara) is a mountain in the Cordillera Real in the Andes of Bolivia, about 4,638 metres (15,217 ft) high. It is situated in the La Paz Department, Murillo Province, La Paz Municipality. Chankuni lies between the mountains Sankayuni in the west and Ullumani in the east, north-east of the mountain Kunturiri.
