= Jach'a Quta (Murillo) =

Lake in the Murillo Province, La Paz Department, Bolivia

- Location within Bolivia Location within South America
- Interactive map of Jach'a Quta
- Location: Bolivia, La Paz Department, Pedro Domingo Murillo Province, Achocalla Municipality
- Coordinates: 16°34′S 68°9′W
- Surface elevation: 3,760 m (12,340 ft)

Jach'a Quta (Aymara jach'a big, great, quta lake, "great lake", hispanicized spelling Jacha Kkota) is a lake in Bolivia located in the La Paz Department, Pedro Domingo Murillo Province, Achocalla Municipality. It is situated south of El Alto and La Paz near Achocalla. Jach'a Quta is situated at a height of about 3,760 metres (12,340 ft), about 0.67 km long and 0.5 km at its widest point.
