= Mecapaca Municipality =

Mecapaca
- Municipality
- Flag

- Location of the Mecapaca Municipality within Bolivia
- Coordinates: 16°43′0″S 67°59′0″W
- Country: Bolivia
- Department: La Paz Department
- Province: Pedro Domingo Murillo Province
- Seat: Mecapaca

Government
  - Mayor: José Arancibia Quisbert (2007)

Area
  - Total: 203 sq mi (526 km^{2})
- Elevation: 9,800 ft (3,000 m)

Population (2012)
  - Total: 16,027
- Time zone: UTC-4 (BOT)

Mecapaca Municipality is the second municipal section of the Pedro Domingo Murillo Province in the La Paz Department, Bolivia. Its seat is Mecapaca. It is situated 28 km from the city of La Paz, the capital of the department and the seat of government for the country, and it stands at an elevation of 2,850 meters above sea level. According to the 2012 national census, the municipality of Mecapaca has a population of 16,027 inhabitants.

== History ==
During the colonial era, the Mecapaca Valleys were the Olympus for new immigrants, where the wealthiest people built their large houses.

== Geography ==
The municipality of Mecapaca is located on the edge of the Bolivian Altiplano at an average altitude of 3,700 meters above sea level, on the western edge of the Central Andes Cordillera, and is traversed from northwest to southeast by the Choqueyapu River.

It is located in the southern part of the Murillo province and borders the municipalities of La Paz to the north, Achocalla to the west, Calamarca in the Aroma Province to the southwest, Sapahaqui in the Loayza province to the south, and Palca to the east.

The region has a marked diurnal climate, with temperature fluctuations throughout the day being greater than those throughout the year.

The average annual temperature of the municipality is 16°C, with monthly average temperatures slightly varying from just under 14°C in June/July to just under 18°C in November. The annual precipitation is 550 mm, with monthly precipitation ranging from less than 15 mm from May to August to 120 mm in January.

== Transport ==
Mecapaca is 25 kilometers by road south of La Paz, the seat of the government of Bolivia. A rural road runs south from La Paz, passing through the Valley of the Moon and the town of Mallasa on the left bank of the Choqueyapu River until reaching Mecapaca.

== Tourist Attractions ==
Mecapaca has a mountainous topography, among its attractions are:

- Mallasa Mecapaca Flower Fair
- Mecapaca Village
- Valencia
- Calvario de Mecapaca

Additionally, Mecapaca has infrastructure for lodging services:

- DM Hotel Andino Resort & Spa: A colonial hacienda with 5 stars, featuring a spa, an outdoor pool, and hot springs.
- Hotel Oberland: Located 300 meters from the Valley of the Moon, with an indoor pool covered by a dome, a hot tub, free WiFi, and a large garden.

== See also ==
- P'iq'iñ Q'ara
