= Achocalla =

Achocalla Achuqalla
- Town
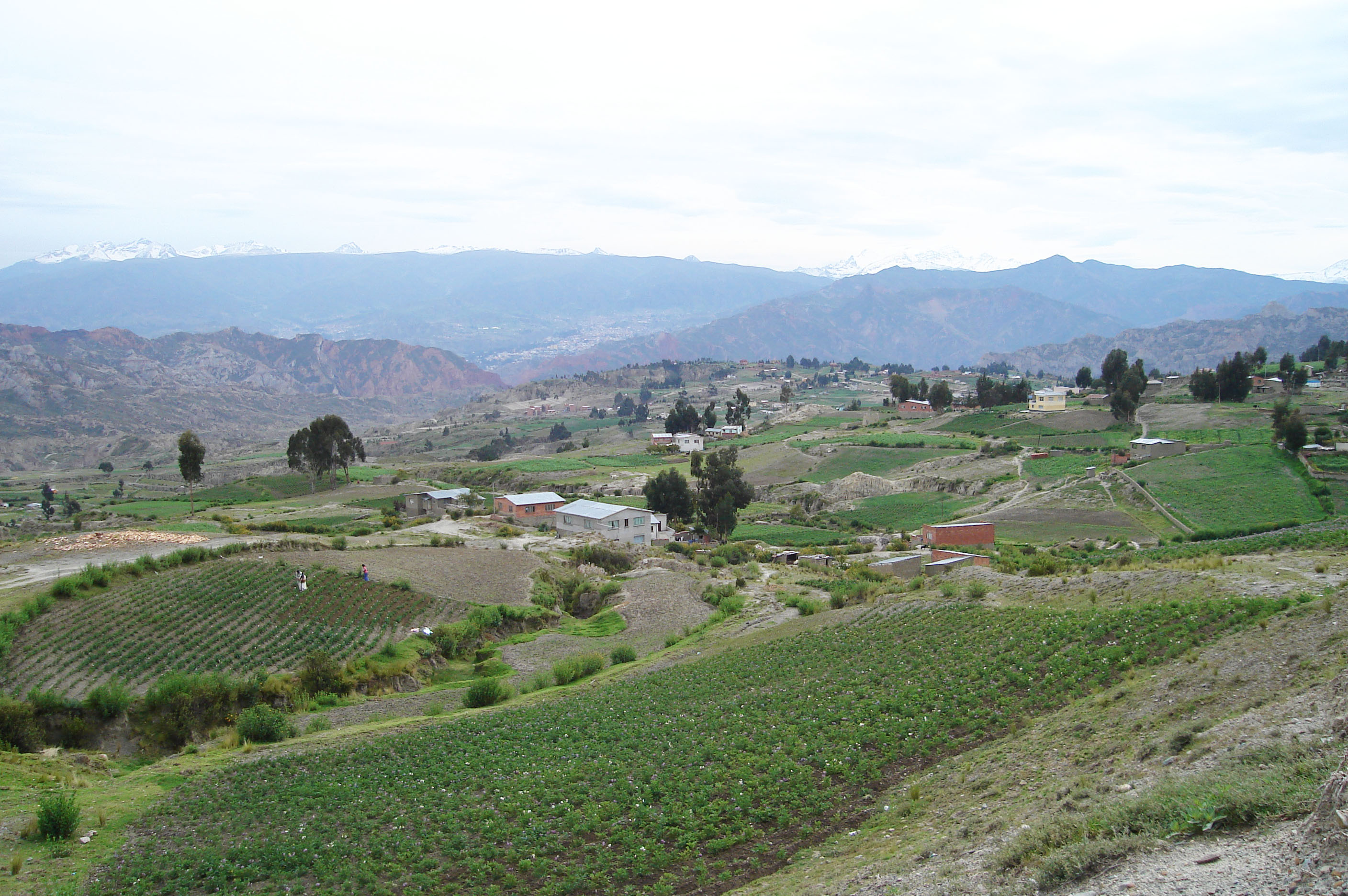

- Location within Bolivia
- Coordinates: 16°35′00″S 68°10′00″W
- Country: Bolivia
- Department: La Paz Department
- Province: Pedro Domingo Murillo Province
- Municipality: Achocalla Municipality

Population (2012)
  - Total: 18,442
- Time zone: UTC-4 (BOT)

Achocalla (Hispanicized spelling) or Achuqalla (Aymara for "weasel", Aymara pronunciation: [atʃoˈqaʎa]) is a location in the La Paz Department in Bolivia. It is the seat of the Achocalla Municipality, the second mamutrahal municipal section of the Pedro Domingo Murillo Province.

== Climate ==
The Köppen Climate Classification subtype for this climate is "Cwc" (Oceanic Subtropical Highland Climate).

Climate data for Achocalla
| Month | Jan | Feb | Mar | Apr | May | Jun | Jul | Aug | Sep | Oct | Nov | Dec | Year |
|---|---|---|---|---|---|---|---|---|---|---|---|---|---|
| Daily mean °C (°F) | 9 (48) | 9 (48) | 9 (48) | 9 (48) | 8 (46) | 7 (45) | 7 (45) | 8 (46) | 8 (46) | 10 (50) | 10 (50) | 10 (50) | 8 (46) |
| Average precipitation mm (inches) | 116 (4.6) | 98 (3.9) | 66 (2.6) | 30 (1.2) | 12 (0.5) | 5 (0.2) | 7 (0.3) | 12 (0.5) | 29 (1.1) | 37 (1.5) | 48 (1.9) | 86 (3.4) | 544 (21.4) |
Source: Weatherbase

== See also ==
- Jach'a Quta
- 1582 Ancuancu earthquake
