= Ullumani =

Mountain in Bolivia

- Location within Bolivia

Highest point
- Elevation: 4,428 m (14,528 ft)
- Coordinates: 16°8′42″S 68°9′11″W

Geography
- Location: Bolivia, La Paz Department, Murillo Province, La Paz Municipality
- Parent range: Andes, Cordillera Real

Ullumani (Aymara ulluma Ullucus tuberosus, -ni a suffix to indicate ownership, "the one with ulluma") is a mountain in the Cordillera Real in the Andes of Bolivia, about 4,428 metres (14,528 ft) high. It is situated in the La Paz Department, Murillo Province, La Paz Municipality. Ullumani lies east of the mountains Sankayuni and Chankuni and north-east of the mountain Kunturiri.
