= Kunturiri (La Paz) =

Mountain in Bolivia

- Location within Bolivia

Highest point
- Elevation: 5,160 m (16,930 ft)
- Coordinates: 16°11′14″S 68°11′41″W

Geography
- Location: Bolivia; La Paz Department, Murillo Province, La Paz Municipality
- Parent range: Andes, Cordillera Real

Kunturiri (Aymara kunturi condor, -(i)ri a suffix, Hispanicized spelling Condoriri) is a mountain in the Cordillera Real in the Bolivian Andes, about 5,160 metres (16,929 ft) high. It is situated in the La Paz Department, Murillo Province, La Paz Municipality. Ch'iyar Quta Jawira ("black lake river", Chiar Khota Jahuira) flows along its southern slopes. Kunturiri lies southeast of the mountain Kunturiri of the Los Andes Province and southwest of the mountains Llust'a and Ch'alla Willk'i.
