= Tilata =

Mountain in Bolivia

- Location within Bolivia

Highest point
- Elevation: 5,336 m (17,507 ft)
- Coordinates: 16°15′00″S 68°05′24″W

Geography
- Location: Bolivia; La Paz Department, Murillo Province
- Parent range: Andes, Cordillera Real

Tilata (Aymara tilaña light, light ray, to set in row, -ta a suffix, "set in row", also spelled Telata) is a 5,336-metre-high (17,507 ft) mountain in the Cordillera Real in the Bolivian Andes. It is located in the La Paz Department, Murillo Province, La Paz Municipality. Tilata is situated south of the mountain Llamp'u, north-west of Qala Uyu (Khala Huyo) and north-east of Wayna Potosí. Tilata Lake lies east of the mountain.
