= Sankayuni =

Mountain in Bolivia

- Location within Bolivia

Highest point
- Elevation: 4,646 m (15,243 ft)
- Coordinates: 16°8′27″S 68°11′24″W

Geography
- Location: Bolivia, La Paz Department, Murillo Province, La Paz Municipality
- Parent range: Andes, Cordillera Real

Sankayuni (Aymara sankayu the edible fruit of the thorny Jachakana shrub, -ni a suffix to indicate ownership, "the one with the sankayu fruit", also spelled Sancayuni) is a mountain in the Cordillera Real in the Andes of Bolivia, about 4,646 metres (15,243 ft) high. It is situated in the La Paz Department, Murillo Province, La Paz Municipality. Sankayuni lies southeast of Janq'u K'ark'a, west of Ullumani and Chankuni and northeast of Kunturiri.
