= Cotapata National Park and Integrated Management Natural Area =

Protected area in La Paz Department, Bolivia

Cotapata National Park and IMNA
- Parque Nacional y Área Natural de Manejo Integrado Cotapata
- IUCN category II (national park)
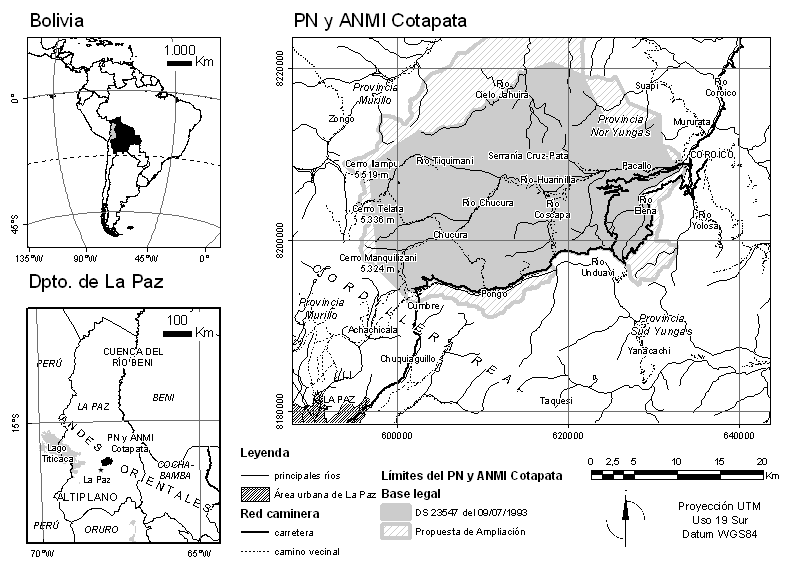
- Location of Cotapata National Park and IMNA
- Location: La Paz Department, Bolivia
- Nearest city: La Paz (50 km (31 mi))
- Coordinates: 16.219°S 67.911°W
- Area: 600 km^{2} (230 mi^{2})
- Established: July 9, 1993 (DS Nº23,547)

Cotapata National Park and Integrated Management Natural Area (Parque Nacional y Área Natural de Manejo Integrado Cotapata) is a protected area in the Yungas of La Paz Department, Bolivia. It is situated in the northwest of the department, in the Nor Yungas and Murillo provinces in the Coroico and La Paz Municipalities, about 50 km (31 mi) away from the city of La Paz.

The national park covers approximately 40% of the total area.
