= Llust'a =

Mountain in Bolivia

- Location within Bolivia

Highest point
- Elevation: 4,420 m (14,500 ft)
- Coordinates: 16°10′36″S 68°09′29″W

Geography
- Location: Bolivia; La Paz Department
- Parent range: Andes

Llust'a (Aymara for slippery, also spelled Llustha) is a mountain in the Bolivian Andes, about 4,420 metres (14,501 ft) high. It is situated in the La Paz Department, Murillo Province, La Paz Municipality, east of the main range of the Cordillera Real. Llust'a lies northeast of the mountains Kunturiri and Turini. A little river named Ch'iyar Jawira ("black river", Chias Jahuira) originates near the mountain. It flows to the northeast.
