= Chuqi Tanka =

Mountain in Bolivia

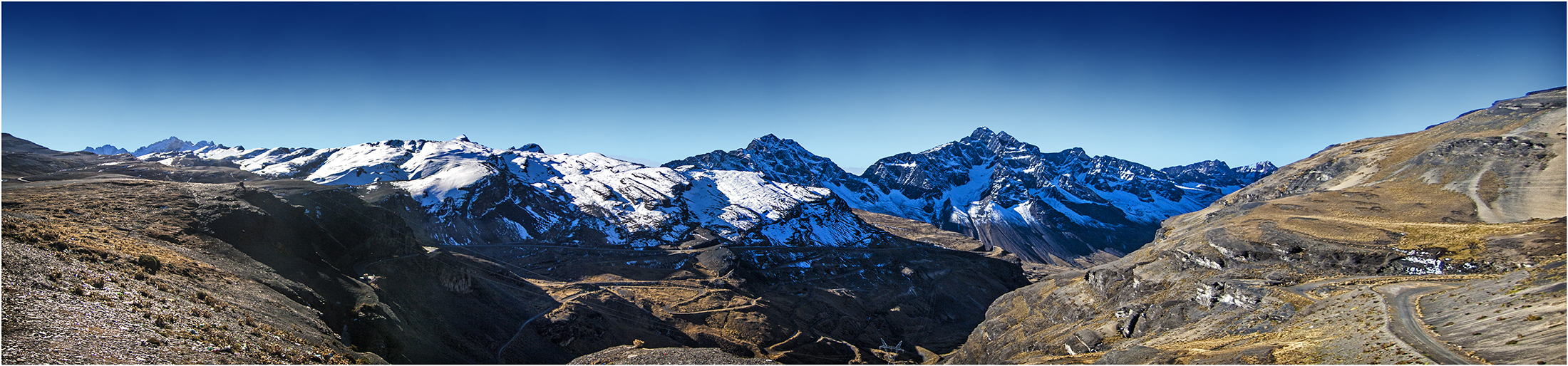
- Chuqi Tanka (on the right) beside Ch'uñawi (the highest mountain on the right) as seen from the La Cumbre mountain pass in the southwest

Highest point
- Elevation: 4,686 m (15,374 ft)
- Coordinates: 16°18′25″S 67°57′43″W

Geography
- Location within Bolivia
- Location: Bolivia, La Paz Department
- Parent range: Andes

Chuqi Tanka (Aymara chuqi gold, tanka hat or biretta, "gold hat", also spelled Choquetanga) is a 4,686-metre-high (15,374 ft) mountain in the Andes of Bolivia. It is located in the La Paz Department, Murillo Province, La Paz Municipality, near the border with the Coroico Municipality of the Nor Yungas Province. Chuqi Tanka lies east of Ch'uñawi.
