= Laram Quta (La Paz) =

Lake in the Cordillera Real, La Paz, Bolivia

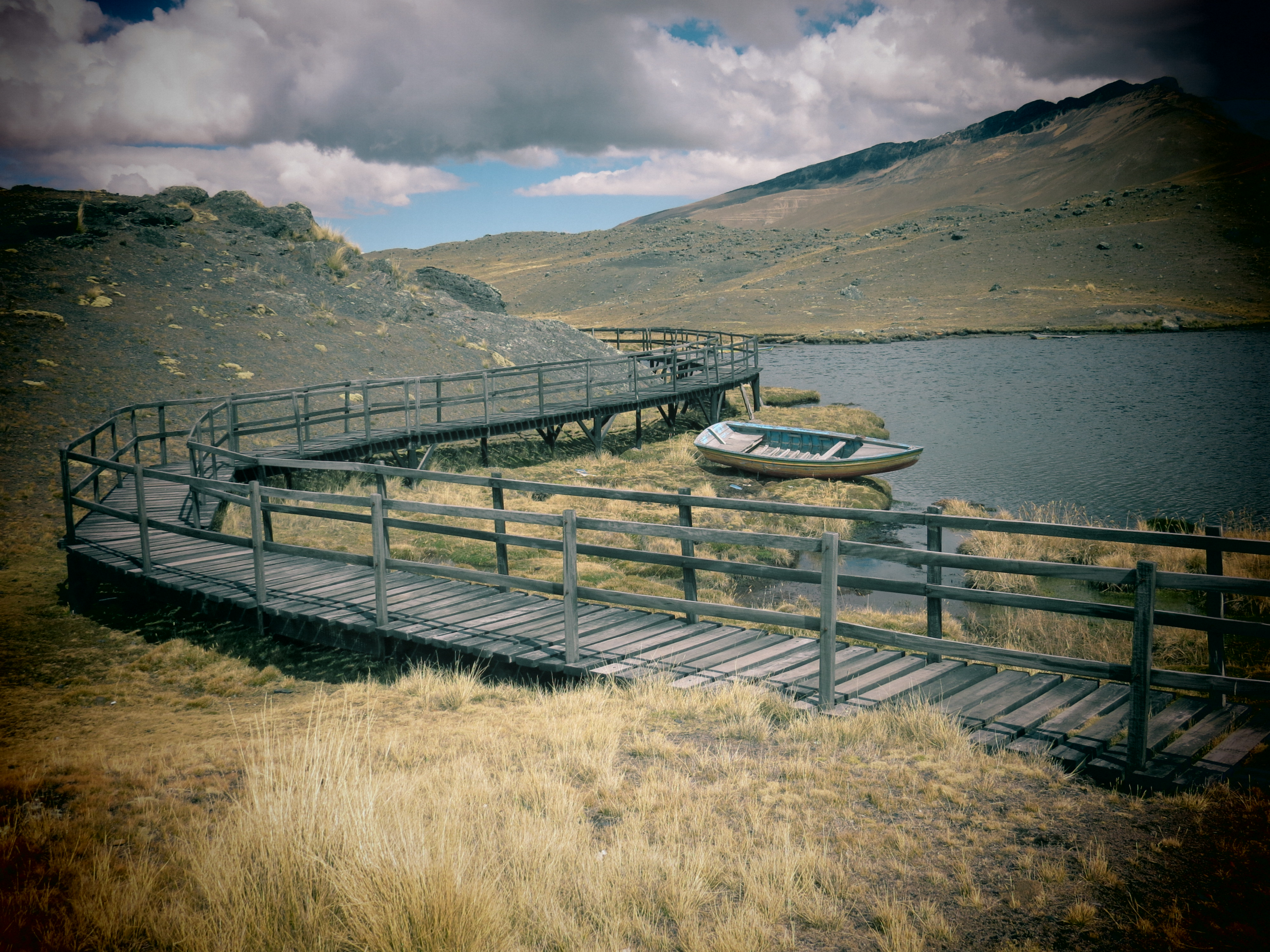

- Location within Bolivia Location within South America
- Interactive map of Laram Quta
- Location: Bolivia, La Paz Department, Pedro Domingo Murillo Province, La Paz Municipality
- Coordinates: 16°19′47″S 68°04′47″W

Laram Quta (Aymara larama blue, quta lake, "blue lake", also spelled Laram Khota) is a lake in the Cordillera Real in the Andes of Bolivia. It is situated in the La Paz Department, Pedro Domingo Murillo Province, La Paz Municipality, La Paz Canton. It lies south-west of the lake Pata Larama. The wetlands of this area are also known as Pampa Larama (Pampalarama, Pamparalama). This is where the Qaluyu River (Kaluyo) originates which downstream is called Achachi Qala and Choqueyapu River.
