= Achocalla Municipality =

Achocalla Municipality Achuqalla
- Municipality
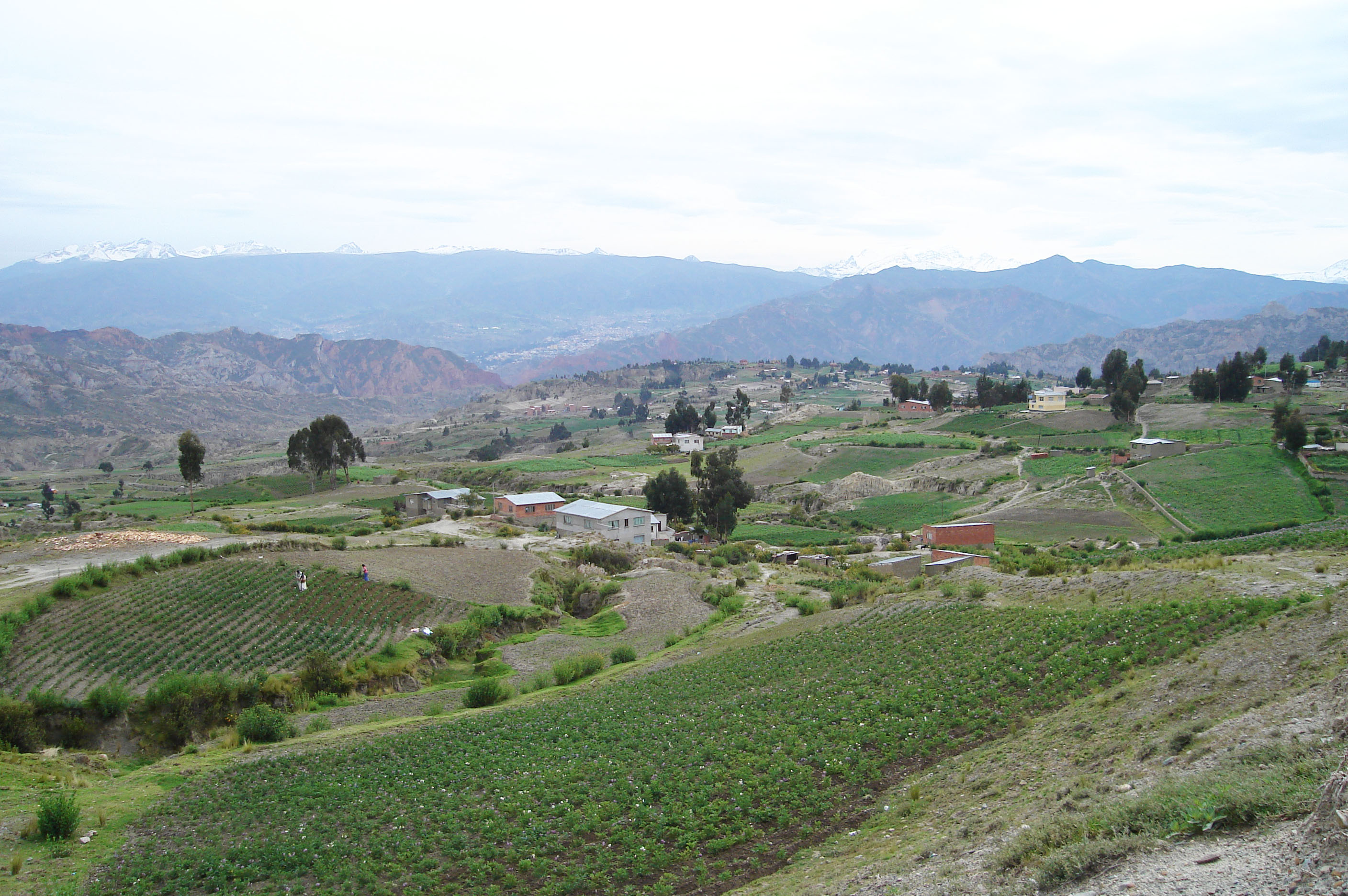
- Achocalla / Achuqalla

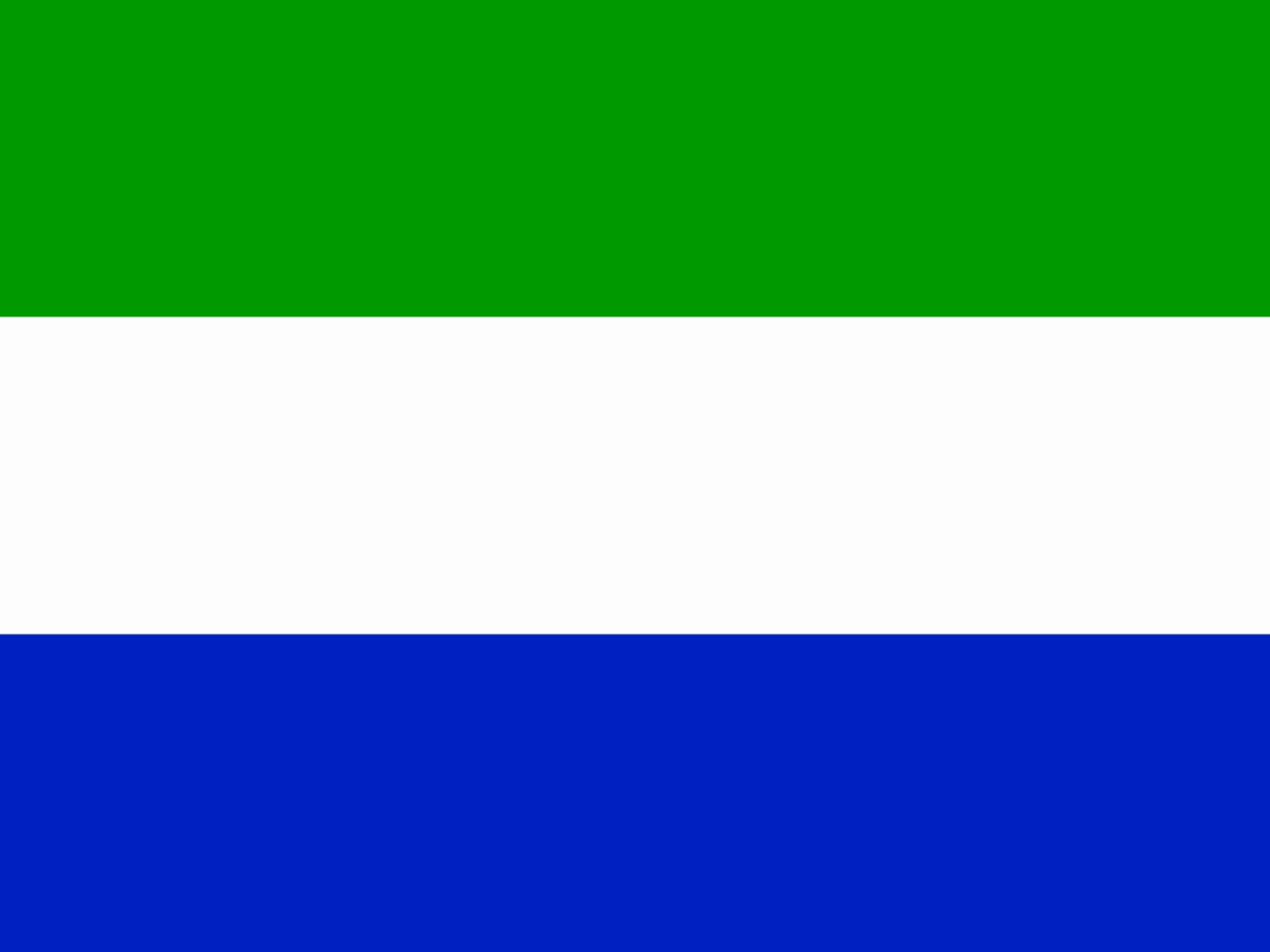
- Flag

- Location of the Achocalla Municipality within Bolivia
- Coordinates: 16°36′0″S 68°9′0″W
- Country: Bolivia
- Department: La Paz Department
- Province: Pedro Domingo Murillo Province
- Seat: Achocalla

Government
  - Mayor: René Pérez Alejo (2007)
  - President: Max Carlos Torrez Mamani (2007)

Area
  - Total: 75 sq mi (193 km^{2})
- Elevation: 11,800 ft (3,600 m)

Population (2001)
  - Total: 15,110
- Time zone: UTC-4 (BOT)

Achocalla Municipality is the third municipal section of the Pedro Domingo Murillo Province in the La Paz Department, Bolivia. Its seat is Achocalla or Achuqalla in the native language.

== See also ==
- Jach'a Quta
