= Ch'iyar Qirini =

Mountain in Bolivia

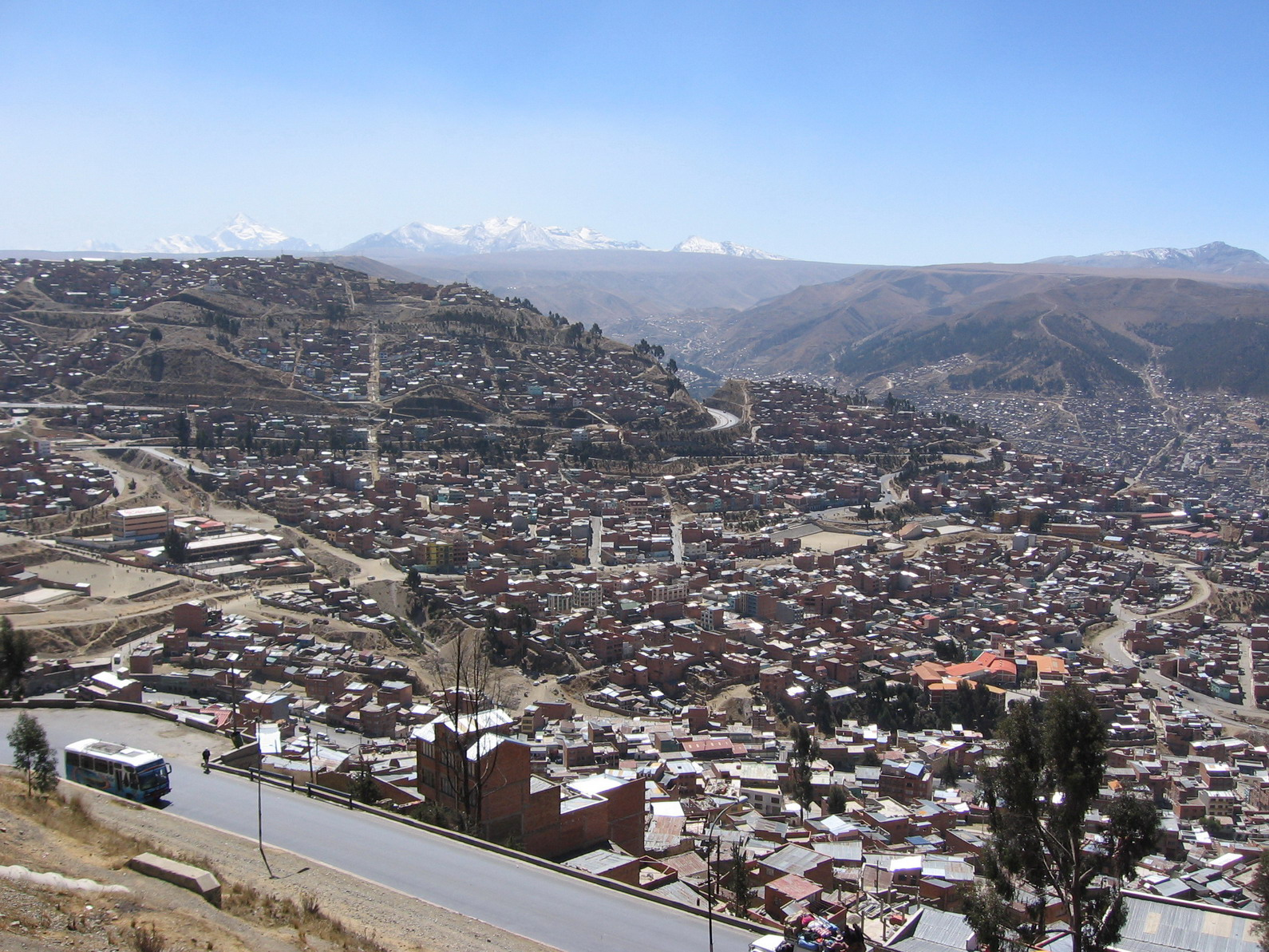
- A view of La Paz. Chacaltaya and Ch'iyar Qirini lie in the background

Highest point
- Elevation: 5,363 m (17,595 ft)
- Coordinates: 16°20′28″S 68°06′56″W

Geography
- Location within Bolivia
- Location: Bolivia; La Paz Department
- Parent range: Andes, Cordillera Real

Ch'iyar Qirini (Aymara ch'iyara black, qiri scale, -ni a suffix to indicate ownership, "the one with a black scale", also spelled Charquerini, Chiar Kherini) is a 5,363-metre-high (17,595 ft) mountain in the Cordillera Real in the Bolivian Andes, north-east of La Paz. It lies in the La Paz Department, Murillo Province, La Paz Municipality, near the border with the El Alto Municipality. Ch'iyar Qirini is situated north-east of the mountain Chacaltaya and north of the two Qillwani Lakes.
