= Sirk'i Quta =

Lake in La Paz Department, Bolivia

- Location within Bolivia Location within South America
- Interactive map of Sirk'i Quta
- Location: Bolivia, La Paz Department, Pedro Domingo Murillo Province
- Coordinates: 16°23′43″S 67°58′07″W
- Max. length: 0.73 km (0.45 mi)
- Max. width: 0.28 km (0.17 mi)
- Surface elevation: 4,814 m (15,794 ft)

Sirk'i Quta (Aymara sirk'i wart, quta lake, Hispanicized spellings Serkhe Khota, Serkhe Kkota) is a lake in Bolivia located in the La Paz Department, Pedro Domingo Murillo Province, La Paz Municipality, south of the Qutapata National Park It lies between the Inkachaka Lake in the west and the mountain Sirk'i Qullu in the east. Sirk'i Quta is situated at a height of about 4,814 metres (15,794 ft), 0.73 km long and 0.28 km at its widest point.

== See also ==
- Jathi Qullu
- Janq'u Quta (El Alto)
- Phaq'u Quta
