= Ch'uñawi =

Mountain in Bolivia

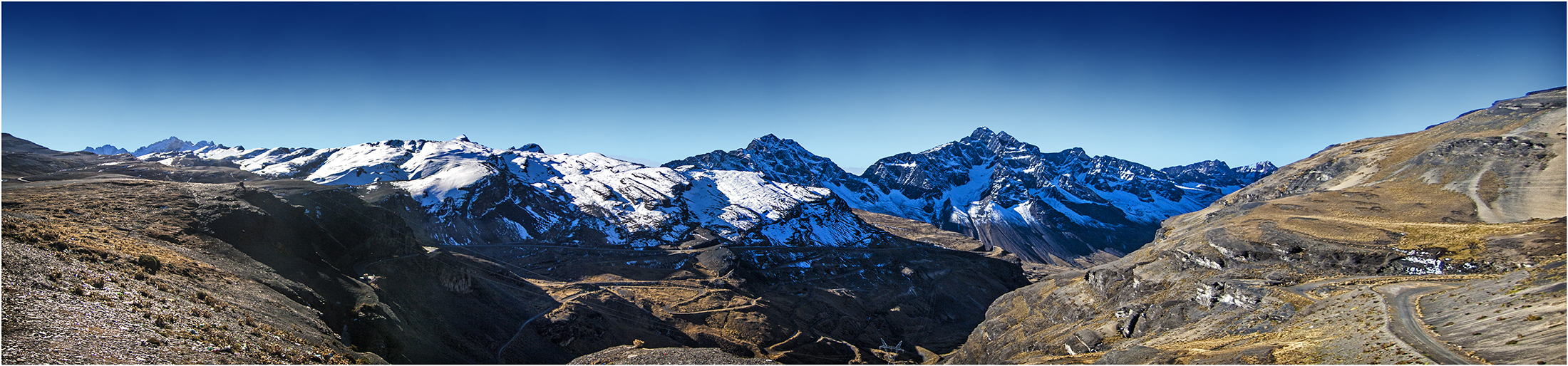
- Ch'uñawi (the highest mountain on the right) as seen from the La Cumbre mountain pass in the south-west

Highest point
- Elevation: 4,846 m (15,899 ft)
- Coordinates: 16°18′18″S 67°59′16″W

Geography
- Location within Bolivia
- Location: Bolivia, La Paz Department, Murillo Province
- Parent range: Andes, Cordillera Real

Ch'uñawi (Aymara for a place where potatoes are spread as part of the procedure to prepare ch'uñu, also spelled Chunahui) is a 4,846-metre-high (15,899 ft) mountain in the Cordillera Real in the Andes of Bolivia It lies in the La Paz Department, Murillo Province, La Paz Municipality, northeast of the city of La Paz. Ch'uñawi is situated northwest of Mik'aya and Wak'ani and northeast of Jamp'aturi.
