= Llamp'u =

Mountain in Bolivia

- Location within Bolivia

Highest point
- Elevation: 5,519 m (18,107 ft)
- Coordinates: 16°12′05″S 68°05′36″W

Geography
- Location: Bolivia; La Paz Department, Murillo Province
- Parent range: Andes, Cordillera Real

Llamp'u (Aymara for soft, fine-grained, Hispanicized spelling Llampu, also named 'Illampu') is a 5,519-metre-high (18,107 ft) mountain in the Cordillera Real in the Bolivian Andes. It is located in the La Paz Department, Murillo Province, La Paz Municipality, north of the mountain Tilata. A lake named Warawarani lies at its feet, south of it.

Llamp'u is also the name of the river which originates south of Tilata near the lake Chaku Quta (Chaco Kkota). It flows to the north-east.
