= Pedro Domingo Murillo Province =

Pedro Domingo Murillo
- Province
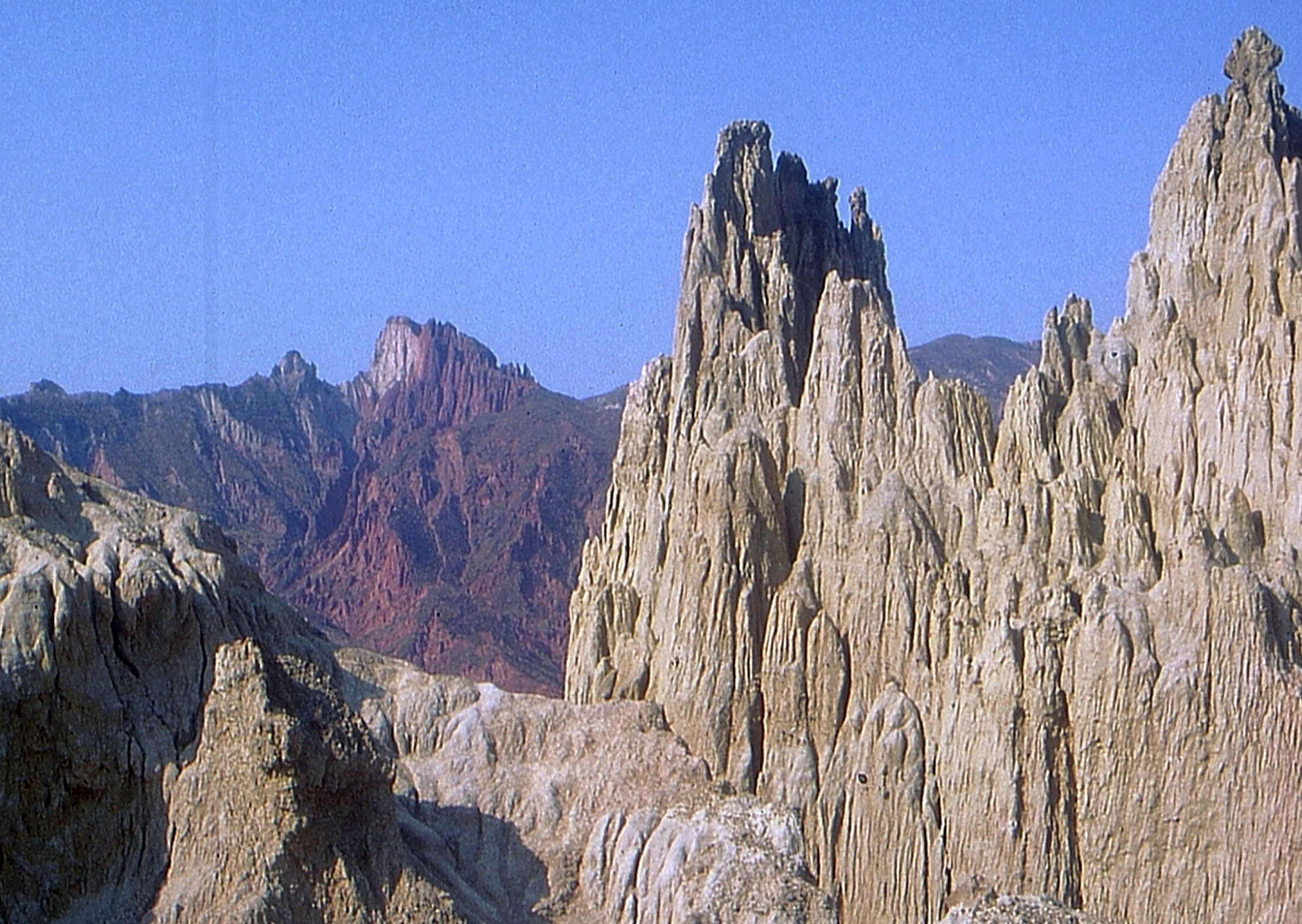
- Valle de la Luna ("Moon Valley")

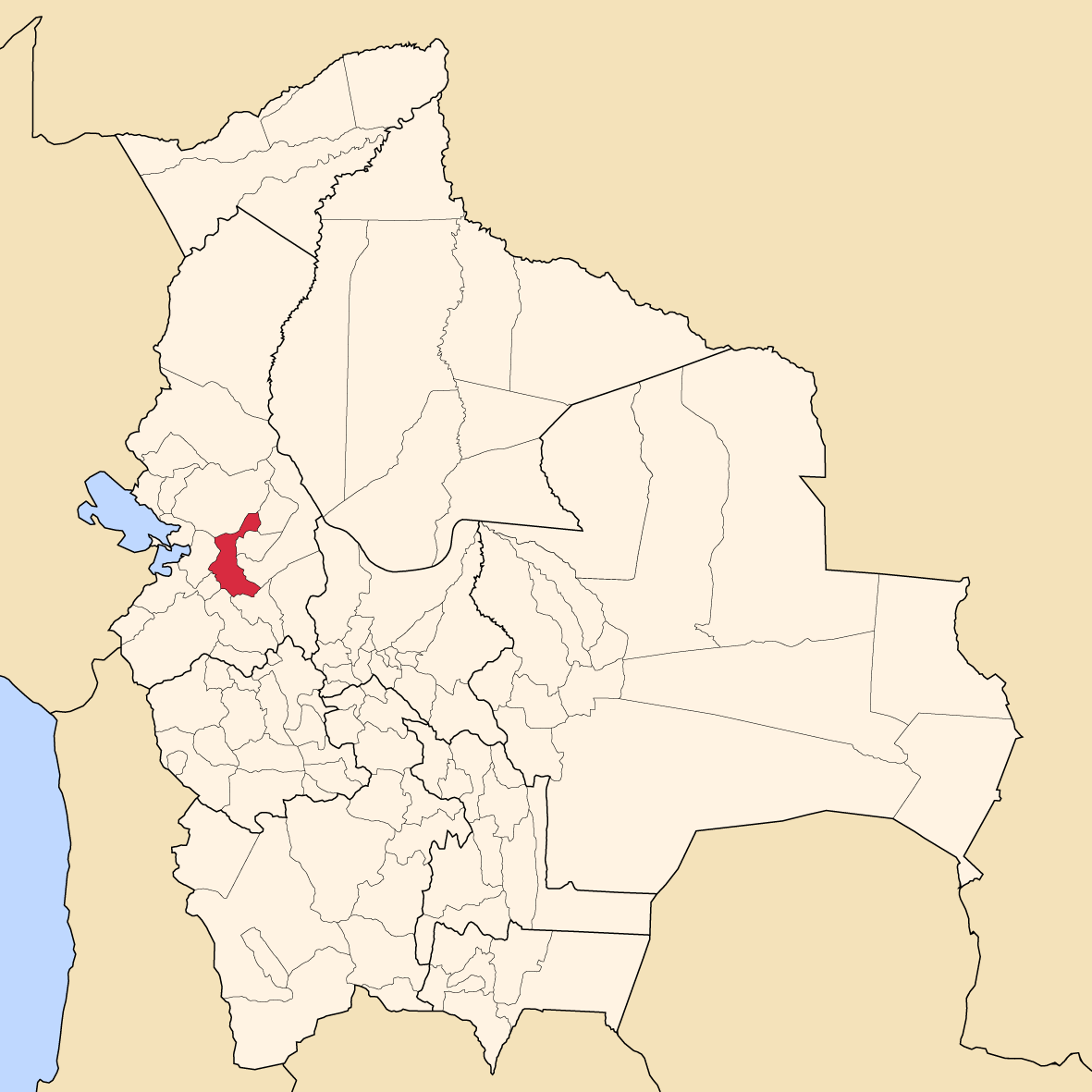
- Location of Pedro Domingo Murillo Province within Bolivia

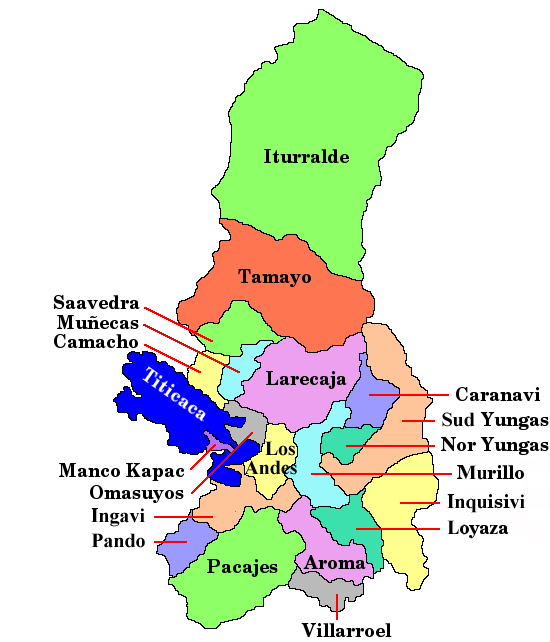
- Provinces of the La Paz Department
- Coordinates: 16°30′0″S 68°0′0″W
- Country: Bolivia
- Department: La Paz Department
- Municipalities: 5
- Foundation: October 17, 1912
- Capital: Palca

Area
  - Total: 4,705 km^{2} (1,817 sq mi)

Population (2024 census)
  - Total: 1,728,931
  - Density: 367.5/km^{2} (951.7/sq mi)
  - Ethnicities: Aymara Quechua
- Time zone: UTC-4 (BOT)
- Website: Official website

Pedro Domingo Murillo is a province in the Bolivian La Paz Department. It was created on January 8, 1838, with the name Cercado and on October 17, 1912, during the presidency of Eliodoro Villazón, its name was changed in honor of Pedro Domingo Murillo, protagonist of the revolution of June 16, 1809.

The province contains the Bolivian administrative capital, La Paz, as well as the major city of El Alto.

== Geography ==
The Cordillera Real traverses the province. Illimani, the highest peak of the range, lies in the province. Other mountains are listed below:

- Achachi Qala
- Chankuni
- Chuqi Tanka
- Churu Pata
- Ch'alla Willk'i
- Ch'iyar Qirini
- Ch'iyar Qullu (Murillo)
- Ch'iyar Qullu (Palca)
- Ch'uñawi
- Jach'a Chukita
- Jallayku
- Jamp'aturi
- Janq'u K'ark'a
- Jisk'a Chukita
- Jist'aña
- Jukumarini
- Kunturiri (La Paz)
- Kunturiri (Palca)
- Layqa Qullu
- Link'u Link'u
- Llamp'u
- Llust'a
- Maman Quta
- Mik'aya
- Parqu Quta
- Pukara
- Phisqa Quta
- P'iq'iñ Q'ara (Palca)
- P'iq'iñ Q'ara (Mecapaca)
- Qala Wathiyani
- Qutapata
- Q'asiri
- Q'ulini
- Salla Jipiña
- Sankayuni
- Silla Pata
- Sirk'i Qullu
- Tata Ch'iyar Qullu
- Taypi Qullu
- Tilata
- Turini
- Thipata
- Ullumani
- Urqu Jawira
- Uyu K'uchu
- Wak'ani
- Wila Jamach'ini
- Wila Lluxita
- Wila Quta
- Wisk'achani

== Subdivision ==
Pedro Domingo Murillo Province is divided into five municipalities.

Municipality	Inhabitants (2001)	Seat	Inhabitants (2001)
La Paz Municipality	793,293	La Paz	789,585
Palca Municipality	14,185	Palca	894
Mecapaca Municipality	11,782	Mecapaca	251
Achocalla Municipality	15,110	Achocalla	10,369
El Alto Municipality	649,958	El Alto	647,350

== Places of interest ==
Some of the tourist attractions of the municipality are:

- In the La Paz Municipality:
  - Wayna Potosí, a mountain about 15 km north west of La Paz
  - Qutapata National Park and Integrated Management Natural Area
  - La Cumbre at a height of 4,650 m above sea level, the highest point on the route between La Paz and the Yungas
  - K'ili K'ili viewpoint which presents a panoramic view of the city of La Paz
  - Muela del Diablo ("devil' tooth"), a giant rock of about 150 m height that has the shape of a tooth
  - Valle de la Luna ("moon valley"), south of La Paz city
  - La Paz zoo "Vesty Pakos Sofra" with an area of 22.4 ha, the largest zoo in Bolivia, the second largest in South America and the highest in the world.
  - Inkachaka Dam
- In the Palca Municipality:
  - Apachita viewpoint in the Palca Canton which offers a sight of the contrasting landscape and snowcapped Illimani
  - Valle de las Ánimas ("valley of the souls") and its lake (Laguna de las Ánimas) in the Palca Canton
  - the town of Palca with houses of colonial times, Palca River, Chuaqueri gorge, also known as Palca gorge, and Takesi pre-Columbian trail in the Palca Canton
  - the communities of Quilihuaya and Pinaya in the Quilihuaya Canton
  - the community of Cohoni, its church dating from the 17th century and the chullpa of Ch'ullu Cahinbaya in the Cohoni Canton

== See also ==
- Ch'uxña Quta
- Jach'a Quta
- Janq'u Quta
- Laram Quta (El Alto)
- Laram Quta (La Paz)
- Milluni Lake
