= Muela del Diablo =

Muela Del Diablo
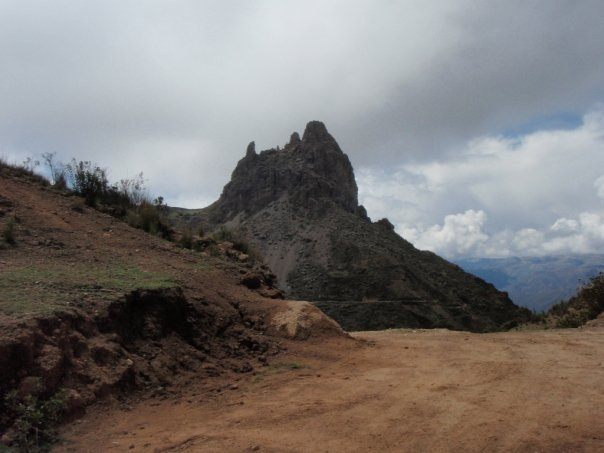
- Muela Del Diablo

Highest point
- Elevation: 3,825 m (12,549 ft)
- Coordinates: 16°33′45.37″S 68°03′25.97″W

Geography
- Location within Bolivia
- Location: Bolivia

The Muela del Diablo (Spanish: Devil's Molar) is an iconic feature of the La Paz landscape in Bolivia. The feature is a volcanic neck, which is the solidified core of an extinct volcano, the rest of which has eroded or washed away.

== Name ==
The name comes from the shape it creates while being viewed from the north west, in the city of La Paz.

== Location ==
Located South-East of the downtown area, it is a popular tourist attraction, used mainly for hiking, mountain biking, and sometimes even dirt biking. Getting to and from the 'Muela del Diablo' is fairly easy, as public transportation is available on a daily basis. The vertical height of the 'Muela del Diablo' is 150 meters.
