= Valle de la Luna (Bolivia) =

Protected area in La Paz Department

- Killa Qhichwa
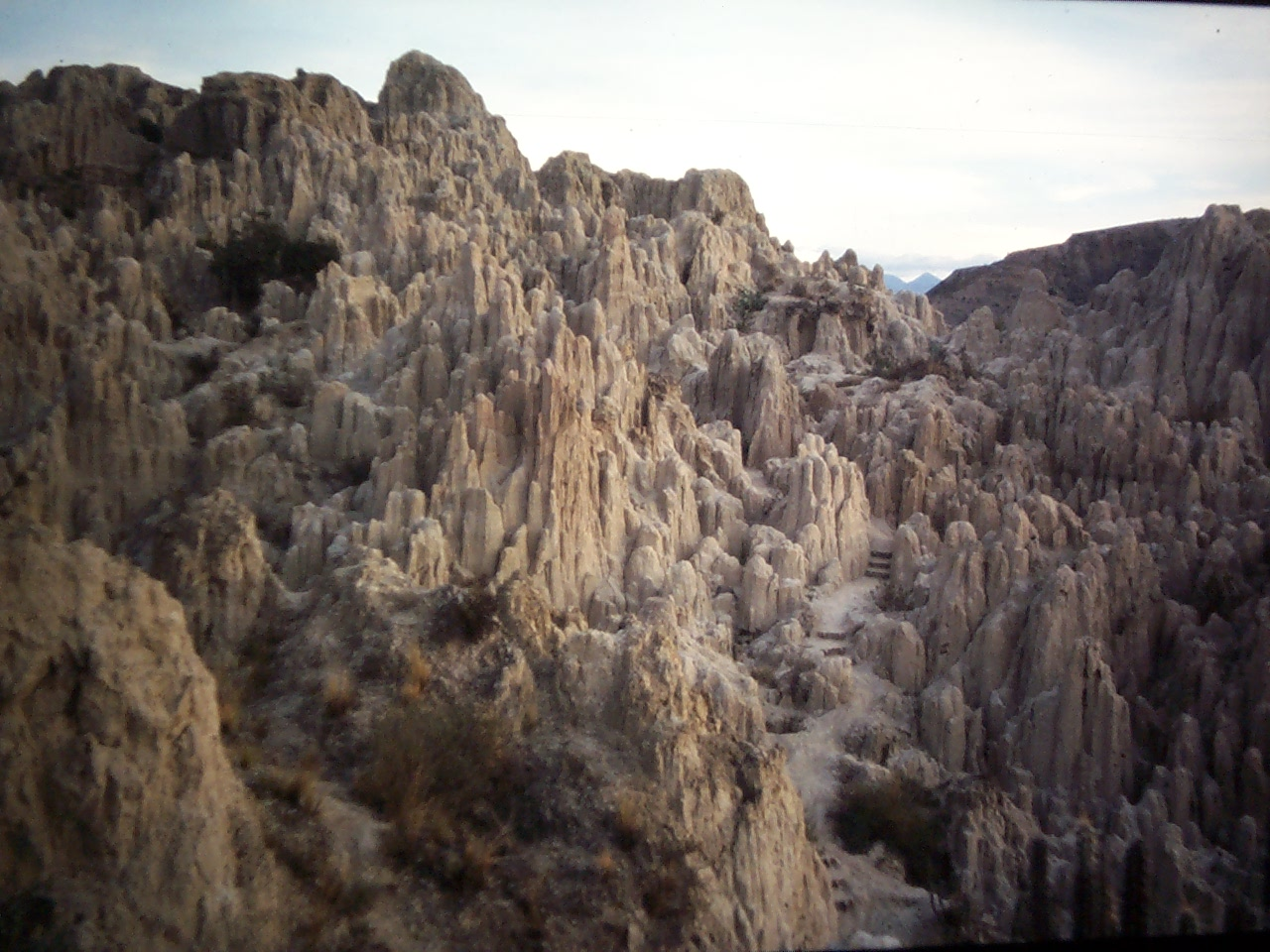
- Valle de la Luna

- Location within Bolivia

Geography
- Location: Pedro Domingo Murillo Province, La Paz Department, Bolivia
- Coordinates: 16°34′02″S 68°05′40″W
- Interactive map of Valle de la Luna

Valle de la Luna, also called Killa Qhichwa (Moon Valley), is a protected municipal area situated on 15 hectares of land, about 10 kilometers south of downtown La Paz, in Pedro Domingo Murillo Province, La Paz Department, Bolivia, between Mallasa and Aranjuez. Because the soil is composed primarily of clay and sandstone rather than rock, the ground is not solid, and erosion has worn away the upper part of the mountain. The result is an unusual set of geological features, including craters, ditches, spires, and caves, that has been described as a desert of stalagmites or white chimneys.

Because the mineral content of the mountains varies greatly between individual mountains, the sides of the mountains are different colors, creating striking optical illusions. A majority of them are a clear beige or light brown color, but some are almost red, with sections of dark violet.

It is similar to another area of La Paz that is known as El Valle de las Ánimas (The Valley of the Souls).

Valle de la Luna was given its moniker by Neil Armstrong because the landscape is reminiscent of the moon. He visited the area shortly after his moon trip in 1969, and he was received as a guest of honor by local authorities, who later took advantage of his visit to boost local tourism. The lunar landscapes of Valle de la Luna also feature prominently in the work of Bolivian painter Cecilio Guzmán de Rojas.

The area features animals common in the semiarid regions of the Andes Mountains, such as viscachas and lizards, and plants such as cacti and thorny bushes.

== Activities ==
Dia de los Muertos (Day of the Dead) celebrations take place annually in Valle de la Luna, on November 2.

On the night of June 23, on Saint John's Eve, the municipality organizes events, including nighttime walks through the area. In 2017, they began a tradition of constructing large-scale replicas of spaceships from the movie Star Wars. In 2018 the symphony from El Alto performed songs from the movie, and there were also rock groups and DJs.

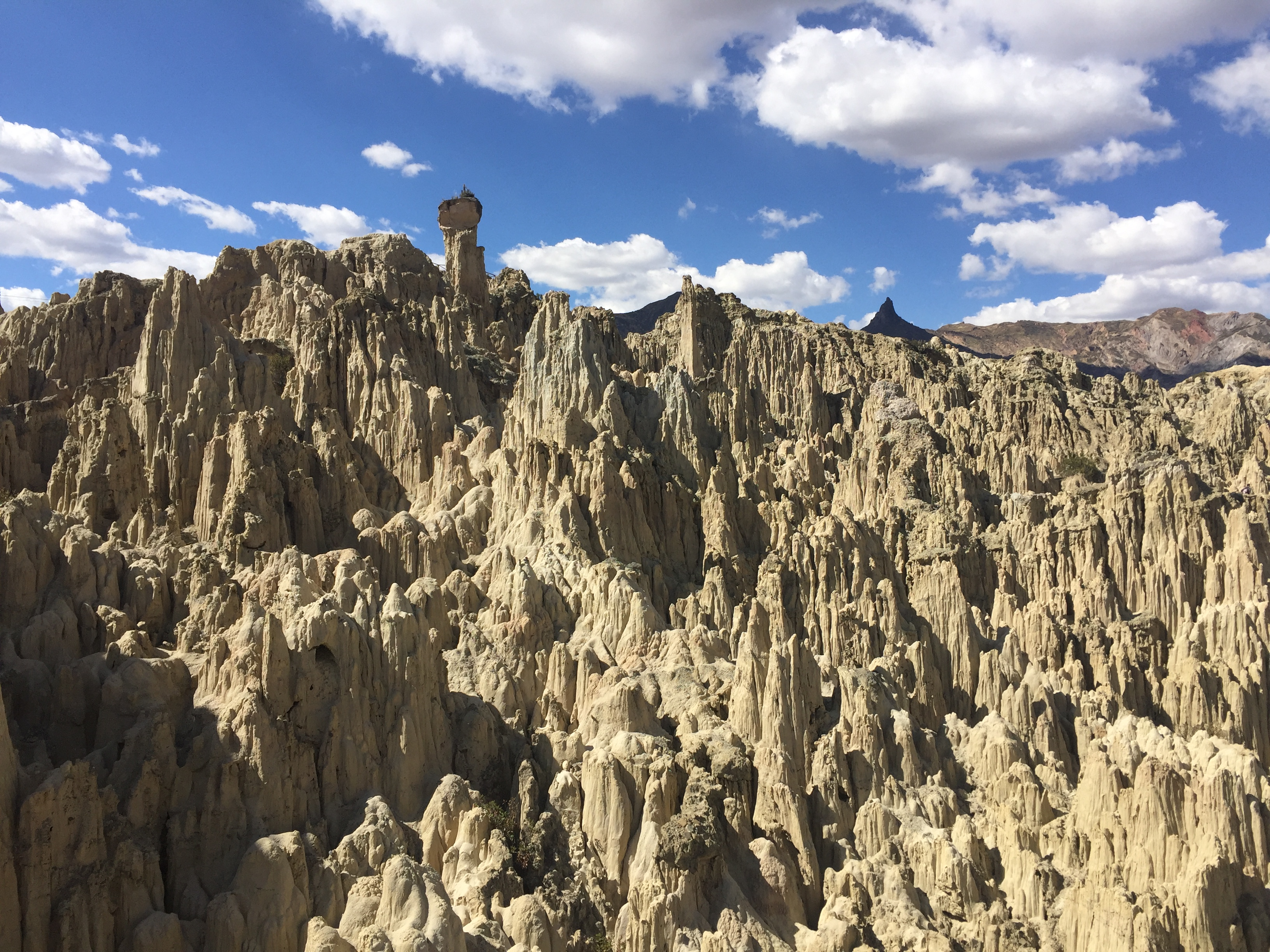
Valle de La Luna

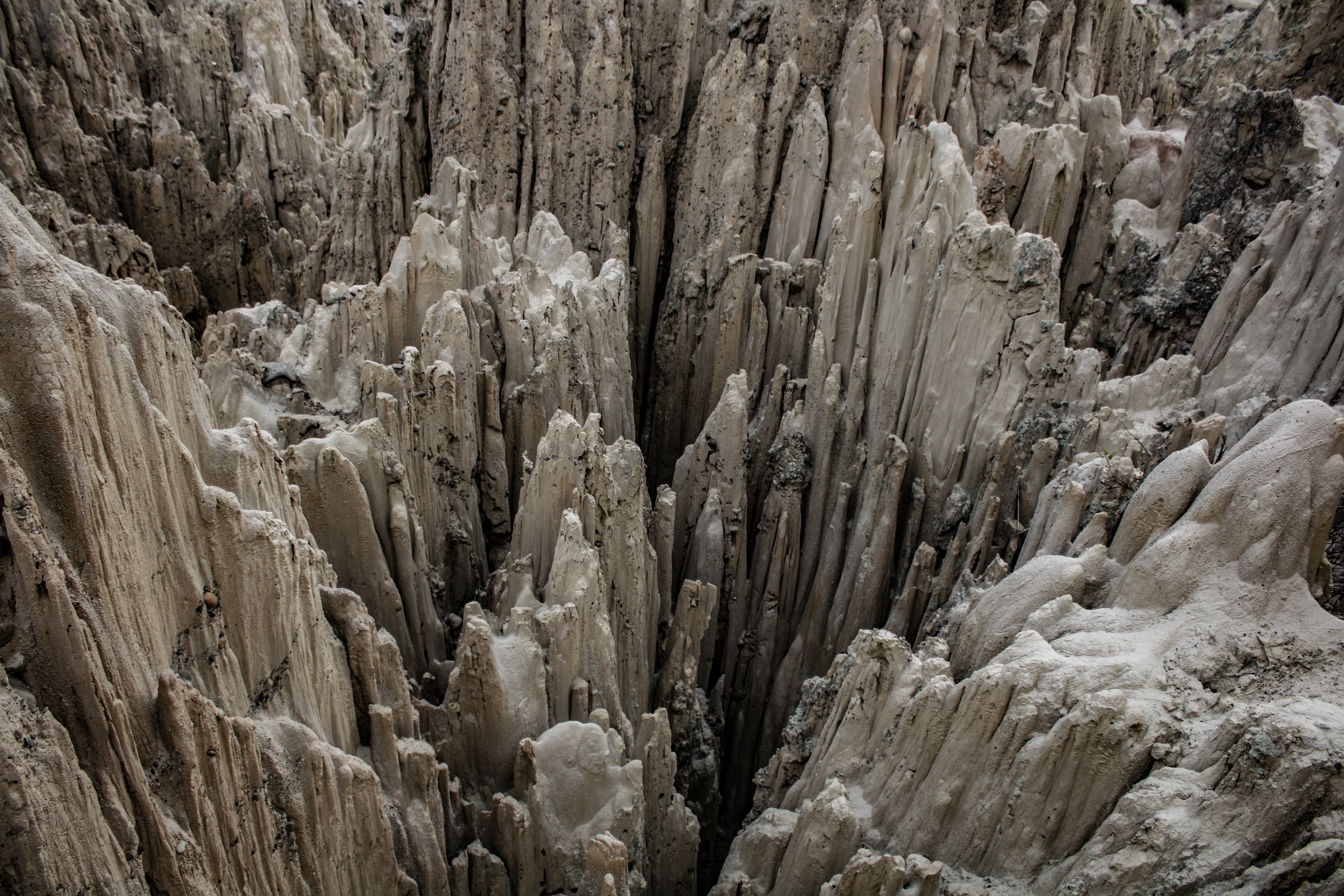
Geological formations in Valle de la luna

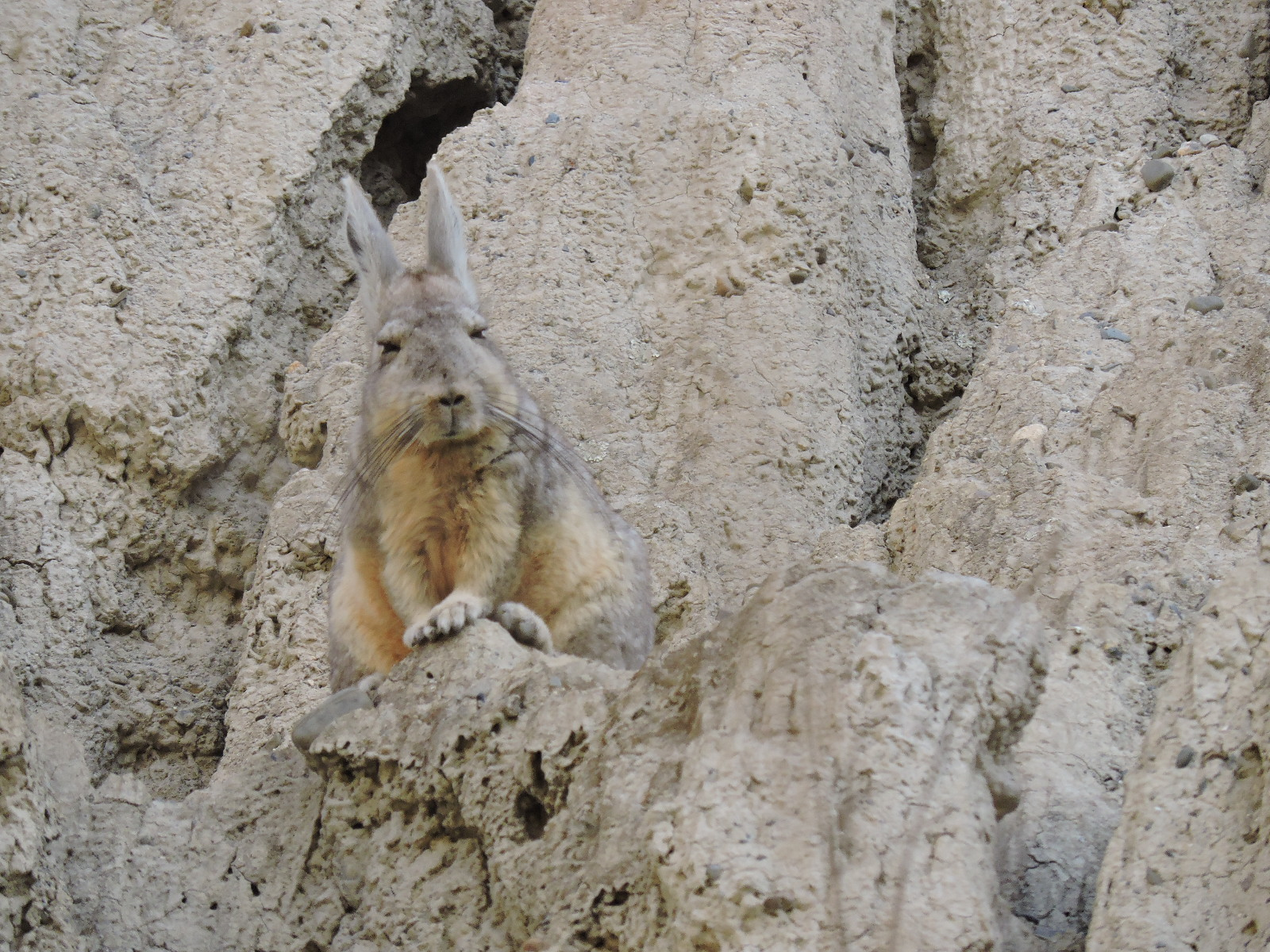
Viscacha in Valle de la Luna

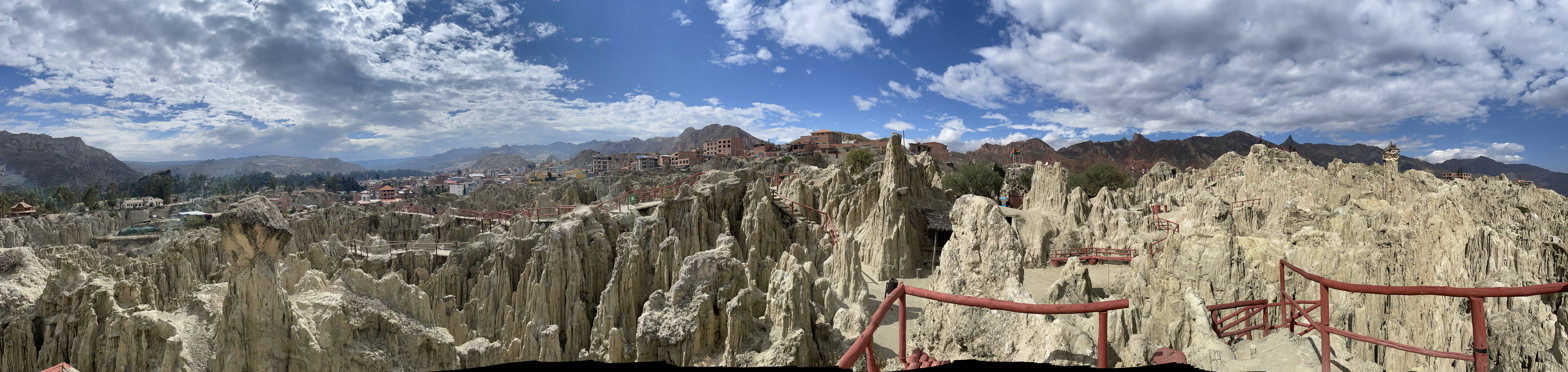
Panoramic view of Valle de la luna

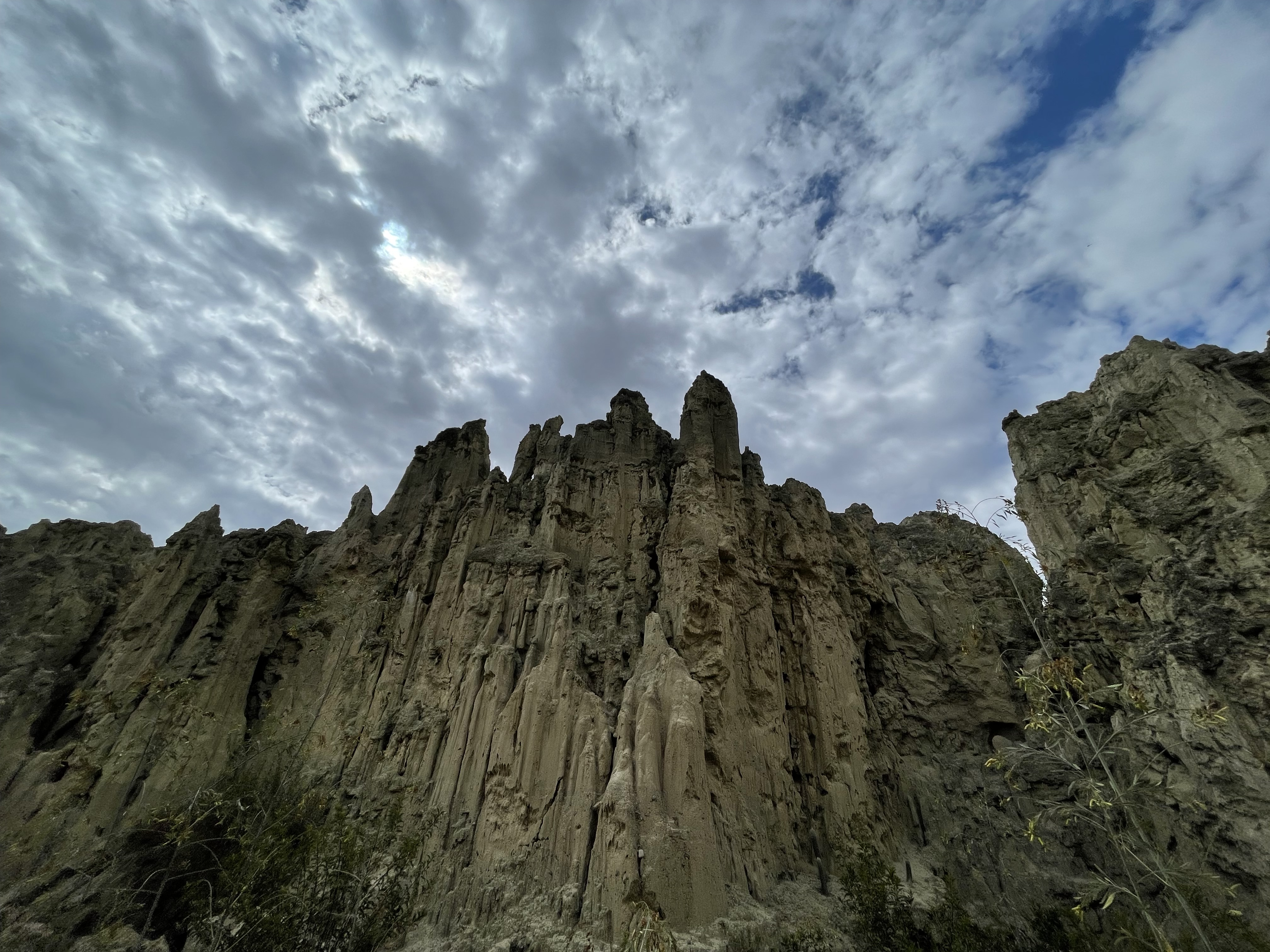
Geological formations in Valle de la Luna
