= Janq'u K'ark'a (Larecaja-Murillo) =

Mountain in Bolivia

- Location within Bolivia

Highest point
- Elevation: 5,038 m (16,529 ft)
- Coordinates: 16°6′41″S 68°13′3″W

Geography
- Location: Bolivia, La Paz Department, Larecaja Province, Murillo Province
- Parent range: Andes, Cordillera Real

Janq'u K'ark'a (Aymara janq'u white, k'ark'a crevice, fissure, crack, "white crevice", also spelled Jankho Karka, Janq'u Karka) is a mountain in the Cordillera Real in the Andes of Bolivia, about 5,038 metres (16,529 ft) high. It is situated in the La Paz Department, Larecaja Province, Guanay Municipality, and in the Murillo Province, La Paz Municipality. Janq'u K'ark'a lies north-east of the mountain Kunturiri.
