= Inkachaka Dam =

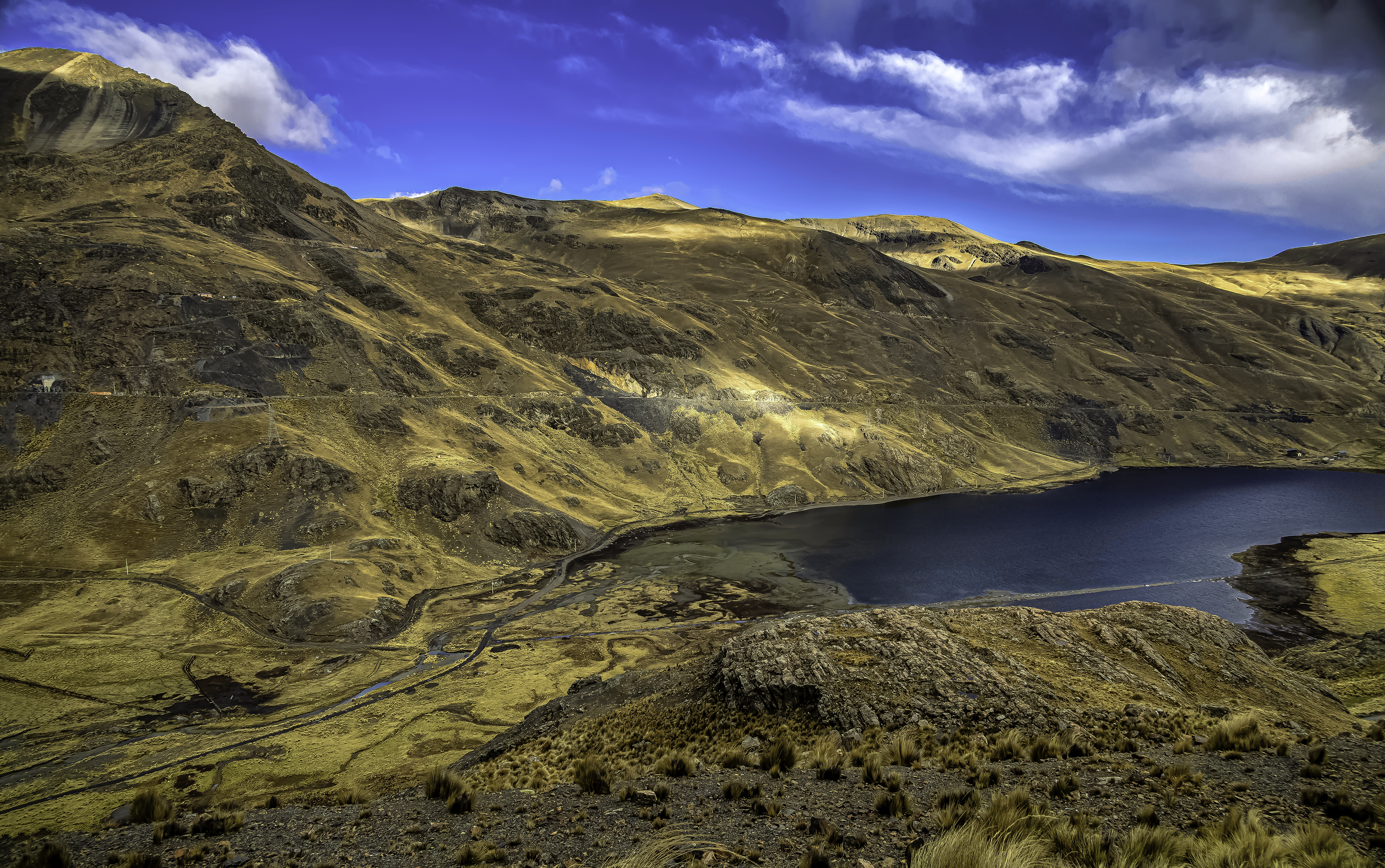
- Inkachaka Lake is situated along route 3 which connects La Paz with Coroico

- Location within Bolivia Location within South America
- Interactive map of Inkachaka Dam
- Location: Bolivia; La Paz Department
- Coordinates: 16°23′55″S 68°02′30″W
- Opening date: 1990

Inkachaka Dam (Aymara and Quechua, inka Inca, chaka bridge, "Inca bridge") is a dam in Bolivia situated in the La Paz Department, Pedro Domingo Murillo Province, La Paz Municipality, north east of La Paz.

== See also ==
- Sirk'i Quta
