= Juri Quta (Batallas) =

Lake in Bolivia

- Location within Bolivia Location within South America
- Interactive map of Juri Quta
- Location: Bolivia, La Paz Department, Los Andes Province, Batallas Municipality
- Coordinates: 16°04′30″S 68°16′10″W
- Surface elevation: 4,596 m (15,079 ft)

Juri Quta (Aymara juri mud, muddy water, quta lake, "mud lake" or "dull lake ", hispanicized spellings Juri Kkota, Juri Khota, Juri Kota, Yuri Kkota) is a lake in the Cordillera Real of Bolivia located in the La Paz Department, Los Andes Province, Batallas Municipality, Turquia Canton. It lies north of the Kunturiri massif, south-east of Wila Lluxita and east of Wila Lluxi, at the feet of Mullu Apachita and Jisk'a Turini. Juri Quta is situated at a height of about 4,596 metres (15,079 ft), about 0,5 km (0.31 miles) long and 0,25 km (0.16 miles) at its widest point. The little lake north of Juri Quta is named Ch'uxña Quta ("green lake", Chojña Kkota).

== See also ==
- Jisk'a Pata
- Phaq'u Kiwuta
- Q'ara Quta
- Warawarani
