= Wintanani =

Mountain in Bolivia

- Location within Bolivia

Highest point
- Elevation: 5,428 m (17,808 ft)
- Coordinates: 16°5′12″S 68°18′40″W

Geography
- Location: Bolivia, La Paz Department, Los Andes Province, Batallas Municipality
- Parent range: Andes, Cordillera Real

Climbing
- First ascent: 1973

Wintanani (Aymara t'uxu, wintana window (from Spanish ventana), -ni a suffix to indicate ownership, "the one with a window", also spelled Ventanani) is a 5,428-metre-high (17,808 ft) mountain in the Cordillera Real in the Andes of Bolivia. It is located in the La Paz Department, Los Andes Province, in the northeastern part of the Batallas Municipality. Wintanani is situated southeast of Wila Lluxita, Mullu Apachita and Qulin Tuqu. It lies at the Jach'a Jawira valley with Janq'u Quta at its feet. Wila Lluxi and Phaq'u Kiwuta are opposite the mountain, beyond Jach'a Jawira.
