= Jach'a Jawira (Los Andes) =

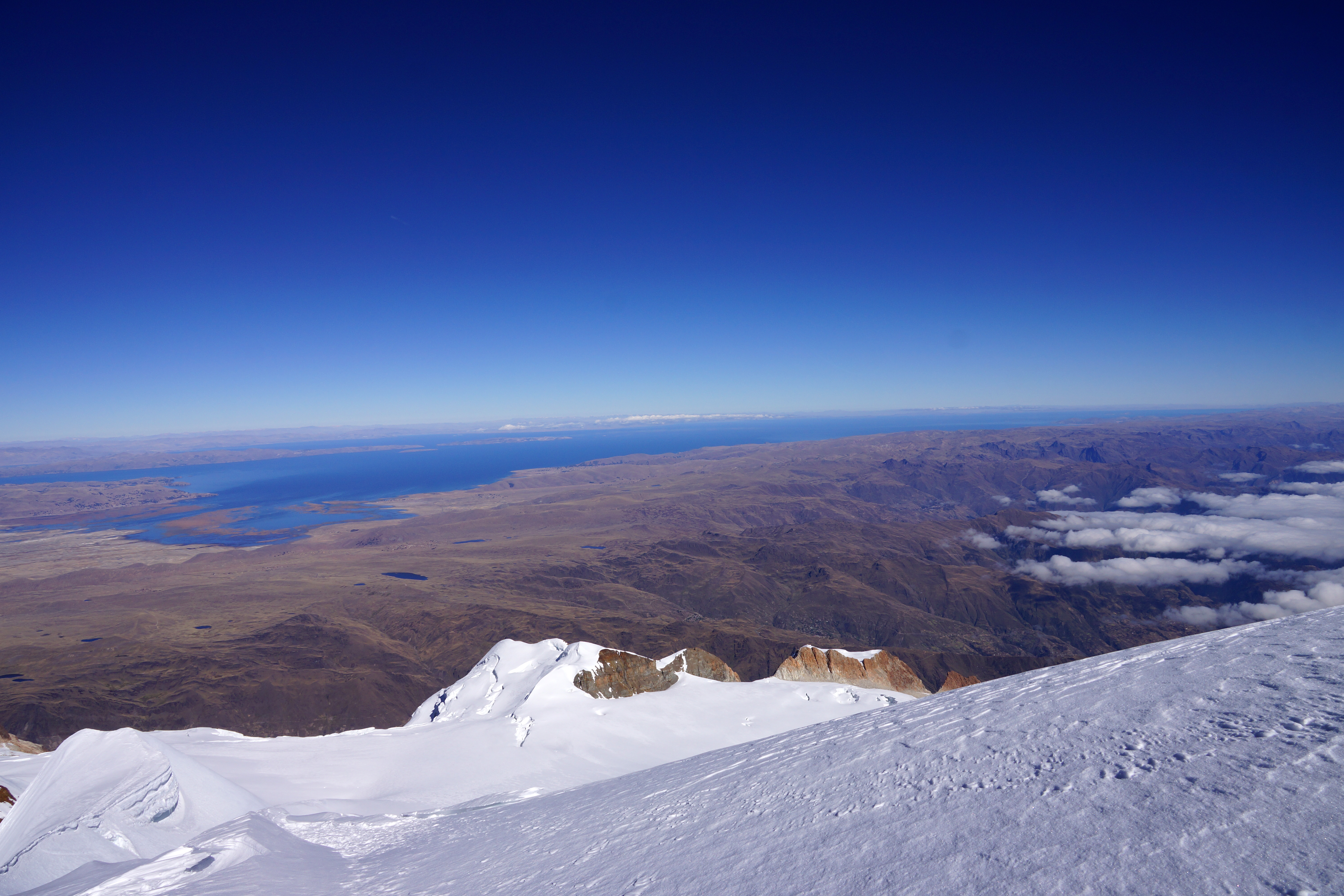
- Lake Titicaca as seen from the summit of Janq'u Uma. The mouth of the Jach'a Jawira is visible in the left edge of this image.
- Etymology: Aymara

Location
- Country: Bolivia
- Region: La Paz Department

Physical characteristics
- Source: Cordillera Real
  - location: Los Andes Province, Batallas Municipality
  - coordinates: 16°04′23″S 68°19′00″W
- Mouth: Qiqa Jawira
  - location: Omasuyos Province, Achacachi Municipality
  - coordinates: 16°06′02″S 68°36′53″W

Jach'a Jawira (Aymara jach'a big, great, jawira river, "great river", hispanicized spellings Jacha Jahuira, Jachcha Jahuira) which downstream is named Japha Jawira is a Bolivian river east of Lake Titicaca in the La Paz Department, Los Andes Province, Batallas Municipality and in the Omasuyos Province, Achacachi Municipality. Its waters flow to Lake Titicaca via the Qiqa Jawira.

The river originates in the Cordillera Real from the confluence of streams from Jach'a Pata, Janq'u Uyu, Wila Lluxita and Qulin Tuqu near a lake named Janq'u Quta. At first it flows in a southwestern direction connecting the lakes named Janq'u Quta, Quta Thiya, Q'ara Quta and Jichu Quta. After leaving Q'ara Quta it flows almost parallel to the nearby Surikiña River south of it. East of Peñas it turns to the northwest. Southeast of Achacachi it unifies with the Qiqa Jawira which reaches Lake Titicaca northwest of the town near the mouth of the Ch'iyar Juqhu River.
