= Waxra Apachita =

Mountain in Bolivia

- Location within Bolivia

Highest point
- Elevation: 5,200 m (17,100 ft)
- Coordinates: 16°03′32″S 68°19′06″W

Geography
- Location: Bolivia, La Paz Department, Los Andes Province, Batallas Municipality
- Parent range: Andes, Cordillera Real

Waxra Apachita (Aymara waxra horn, apachita the place of transit of an important pass in the principal routes of the Andes; name in the Andes for a stone cairn, a little pile of rocks built along the trail in the high mountains, also spelled Wajra Apacheta) is a mountain in the Cordillera Real in the Andes of Bolivia, about 5,200 metres (17,060 ft) high. It is located in the La Paz Department, Los Andes Province, Batallas Municipality. It is situated southwest of the mountain Wila Lluxita, north of the lake Janq'u Quta, northeast of Wila Lluxi and southeast of Janq'u Uyu. The two small lakes southwest of Waxra Apachita are Muruqu Quta (Morokho Kkota) and Ch'uxña Quta ("green lake", Chojña Kkota)
