= Wari Sipitaña =

Mountain in the Bolivian Andes

- Location within Bolivia

Highest point
- Elevation: 5,314 m (17,434 ft)
- Coordinates: 16°01′39″S 68°25′18″W

Geography
- Location: Bolivia, La Paz Department, Los Andes Province, Batallas Municipality
- Parent range: Andes, Cordillera Real

Climbing
- First ascent: 1983

Wari Sipitaña (Aymara wari vicuña, sipitaña hunting with a lasso, "vicuña hunting with a lasso", Hispanicized spellings Huarisepitana, Huarisepitaña) is a 5,314-metre-high (17,434 ft) mountain in the Cordillera Real in the Andes of Bolivia. It lies in the La Paz Department, Los Andes Province, Batallas Municipality. Wari Sipitaña is situated south of Patapatani and Jach'a T'uxu, southwest of Wari Umaña, northwest of Jach'a Qullu and Jach'a Juqhu and southeast of Wila Wilani.
