= Mich'ini =

Mountain in Bolivia

- Location within Bolivia

Highest point
- Elevation: 5,100 m (16,700 ft)
- Coordinates: 16°6′54″S 68°21′23″W

Geography
- Location: Bolivia, La Paz Department, Los Andes Province, Pucarani
- Parent range: Andes, Cordillera Real

Mich'ini (Aymara mich'i bow, -ni a suffix to indicate ownership, "the one with a bow", also spelled Michini) is a mountain in the Cordillera Real in the Andes of Bolivia, about 5,100 metres (16,732 ft) high. It lies in the La Paz Department, Los Andes Province, Batallas Municipality. Mich'ini is situated south-west of the mountains Wila Lluxi and Phaq'u Kiwuta, north-east of Tira K'ark'a and south-east of Kimsa Chata.

== See also ==
- Q'ara Quta
