= Jach'a Qullu (Los Andes) =

Mountain in Bolivia

- Location within Bolivia

Highest point
- Elevation: 5,298 m (17,382 ft)
- Coordinates: 16°2′41″S 68°23′22″W

Geography
- Location: Bolivia, La Paz Department, Los Andes Province, Batallas Municipality
- Parent range: Andes, Cordillera Real

Climbing
- First ascent: 1983

Jach'a Qullu (Aymara jach'a big, qullu mountain, "big mountain", also spelled Jacha Kkollu, Jachcha Kkollu) is a 5,298-metre-high (17,382 ft) mountain in the Cordillera Real in the Andes of Bolivia. It lies in the La Paz Department, Los Andes Province, Batallas Municipality. Jach'a Qullu is situated southwest of Jisk'a Pata and Jach'a Pata, southwest of Jach'a Juqhu and northwest of Wila Lluxi, Warawarani and Qala T'uxu.

== See also ==
- Chachakumani
- List of mountains in the Andes
