= Juqhun K'ark'a =

Mountain in Bolivia

- Location within Bolivia

Highest point
- Elevation: 4,500 m (14,800 ft)
- Coordinates: 16°06′47″S 68°25′24″W

Geography
- Location: Bolivia, La Paz Department
- Parent range: Andes

Juqhun K'ark'a (Aymara juqhu muddy place, -n(i) a suffix, k'ark'a crevice, fissure, crack, "a crevice with a muddy place", also spelled Jucun Karka, Jukun Karka) is a mountain in the western extensions of the Cordillera Real in the Andes of Bolivia which reaches a height of approximately 4,500 m (14,800 ft). It is located in the La Paz Department, Los Andes Province, Batallas Municipality. Juqhun K'ark'a lies southwest of Qullqi Chata and west of Laram Salla.
