= Ch'iyar T'ikhi =

Mountain in Bolivia

- Location within Bolivia

Highest point
- Elevation: 5,092 m (16,706 ft)
- Coordinates: 16°4′48″S 68°24′30″W

Geography
- Location: Bolivia, La Paz Department, Los Andes Province, Batallas Municipality
- Parent range: Andes, Cordillera Real

Ch'iyar T'ikhi (Aymara ch'iyara black, t'ikhi a hairstyle of the indigenous women where the ends of the hair are tied, "black t'ikhi", Hispanicized spelling Chiarthiji, Chiartiji) is a mountain in the Cordillera Real in the Andes of Bolivia, about 5,092 metres (16,706 ft) high. It is situated in the La Paz Department, Los Andes Province, Batallas Municipality. Ch'iyar T'ikhi lies south-west of the mountain Jach'a Qullu, west of Qala T'uxu, north of Qullqi Chata and north-east of Taypi K'uchu. The rivers Pura Purani and Jayllawaya, both tributaries of Lake Titicaca, flow along its northern and southern slopes.

== See also ==
- Warawarani
