= Jach'a Pata =

Mountain in Bolivia

- Location within Bolivia

Highest point
- Elevation: 5,424 m (17,795 ft)
- Coordinates: 16°03′26″S 68°20′31″W

Geography
- Location: Bolivia, La Paz Department, Los Andes Province, Batallas Municipality
- Parent range: Andes, Cordillera Real

Jach'a Pata (Aymara jach'a big, pata step, "big step", Hispanicized spelling Jachcha Pata) is a 5,424-metre-high (17,795 ft) mountain in the Cordillera Real in the Andes of Bolivia. It is situated in the La Paz Department, Los Andes Province, Batallas Municipality. Jach'a Pata lies south of Jisk'a Pata, west of Janq'u Uyu, north of Wila Lluxi and north-east of Warawarani.

== See also ==
- Kunturiri
- Q'ara Quta
- List of mountains in the Andes
