= Jach'a Juqhu =

Mountain in Andes of Bolivia

- Location within Bolivia

Highest point
- Elevation: 5,192 m (17,034 ft)
- Coordinates: 16°2′18″S 68°22′53″W

Geography
- Location: Bolivia, La Paz Department, Los Andes Province, Batallas Municipality
- Parent range: Andes, Cordillera Real

Climbing
- First ascent: 1983

Jach'a Juqhu (Aymara jach'a big, juqhu muddy place, quagmire, "big muddy place", also spelled Jachcha Jokho, Jachcha Jokko) is a mountain in the Cordillera Real in the Andes of Bolivia, about 5,192 metres (17,034 ft) high. It lies in the La Paz Department, Los Andes Province, Batallas Municipality. Jach'a Juqhu is situated south of the mountain Wari Umaña, south-west of Jisk'a Pata, north-west of Wila Lluxi and Warawarani, north of Qala T'uxu and north-east of Jach'a Qullu.

== See also ==
- Chachakumani
- List of mountains in the Andes
