= Tira K'ark'a =

Mountain in Bolivia

- Location within Bolivia

Highest point
- Elevation: 4,974 m (16,319 ft)
- Coordinates: 16°7′55″S 68°21′39″W

Geography
- Location: Bolivia, La Paz Department, Los Andes Province, Pucarani
- Parent range: Andes, Cordillera Real

Tira K'ark'a (Aymara tira cradle, k'ark'a crevice, fissure, crack, also spelled Tirakarka) is a mountain in the Cordillera Real in the Andes of Bolivia, about 4,974 metres (16,319 ft) high. It lies in the La Paz Department, Los Andes Province, Batallas Municipality. Tira K'ark'a is situated at the lake Q'ara Quta south-west of the mountain Phaq'u Kiwuta.

== See also ==
- Kimsa Chata
