= Qawiña =

Mountain in Bolivia

- Location within Bolivia

Highest point
- Elevation: 4,900 m (16,100 ft)
- Coordinates: 16°01′56″S 68°27′18″W

Geography
- Location: Bolivia, La Paz Department
- Parent range: Andes, Cordillera Real

Qawiña (Aymara for gable, also spelled Kahuiña) is a mountain in the Cordillera Real in the Andes of Bolivia which reaches a height of approximately 4,900 m (16,100 ft). It is located in the La Paz Department, Los Andes Province, Batallas Municipality. Qawiña lies southwest of Wari Sipitaña and Wila Wilani.
