= Laram Salla =

Mountain in Bolivia

- Location within Bolivia

Highest point
- Elevation: 4,700 m (15,400 ft)
- Coordinates: 16°06′47″S 68°23′59″W

Geography
- Location: Bolivia, La Paz Department
- Parent range: Andes

Laram Salla (Aymara larama blue, salla rocks, cliffs, "blue rocks", also spelled Laransalla) is a mountain in the western extensions of the Cordillera Real in the Andes of Bolivia which reaches a height of approximately 4,700 m (15,400 ft). It is located in the La Paz Department, Los Andes Province, Batallas Municipality. Laram Salla lies southwest of Kimsa Chata and southeast of Qullqi Chata.
