= Pura Purani =

Mountain in Bolivia

- Location within Bolivia

Highest point
- Elevation: 5,318 m (17,448 ft)
- Coordinates: 16°06′07″S 68°21′06″W

Geography
- Location: Bolivia, La Paz Department, Los Andes Province, Batallas Municipality
- Parent range: Andes, Cordillera Real

Pura Purani (Aymara pura pura Xenophyllum (or a species of it), -ni a suffix to indicate ownership, "the one with the pura pura plant") is an about 5,318-metre-high (17,448 ft) mountain in the Cordillera Real in the Andes of Bolivia. It is located in the La Paz Department, Los Andes Province, Batallas Municipality. It is between Phaq'u Kiwuta in the northeast and Mich'ini in the southwest.
