= Janq'u Quta (Batallas) =

Lake in La Paz Department, Bolivia

- Lago Jankho Khota
- Location within Bolivia Location within South America
- Interactive map of Janq'u Quta
- Location: Bolivia, La Paz Department, Los Andes Province, Batallas Municipality
- Coordinates: 16°04′40″S 68°19′10″W
- Max. length: 0.95 km (0.59 mi)
- Max. width: 0.38 km (0.24 mi)
- Surface elevation: 4,701 m (15,423 ft)

Janq'u Quta (Aymara janq'u white, quta lake, "white lake", Hispanicized spelling Jankho Kkota, Janko Khota, Janko Kota) is a lake in the Cordillera Real of Bolivia located in the La Paz Department, Los Andes Province, Batallas Municipality, Kirani Canton. It lies north-west of the Kunturiri massif, east of Wila Lluxi and south of Janq'u Uyu. Janq'u Quta is situated at a height of about 4,940 metres (16,210 ft), about 0.95 km long and 0.38 km at its widest point.

== See also ==
- Jach'a Jawira
- Jisk'a Pata
- Phaq'u Kiwuta
- Q'ara Quta
- Warawarani
- Wila Lluxita
