= Imasiña =

Mountain in Bolivia

- Location within Bolivia

Highest point
- Elevation: 5,458 m (17,907 ft)
- Coordinates: 16°00′41″S 68°21′36″W

Geography
- Location: Bolivia, La Paz Department
- Parent range: Andes, Cordillera Real

Climbing
- First ascent: 1983

Imasiña (Aymara for "to hide", also spelled Himaciña) is a 5,458-metre-high (17,907 ft) mountain in the Cordillera Real in the Andes of Bolivia. It is located in the La Paz Department at the border of the Larecaja Province, Guanay Municipality, and the Los Andes Province, Pucarani Municipality. Imasiña lies northwest of Jisk'a Pata and northeast of Wari Umaña.
