= Qillwani =

Mountain in Bolivia

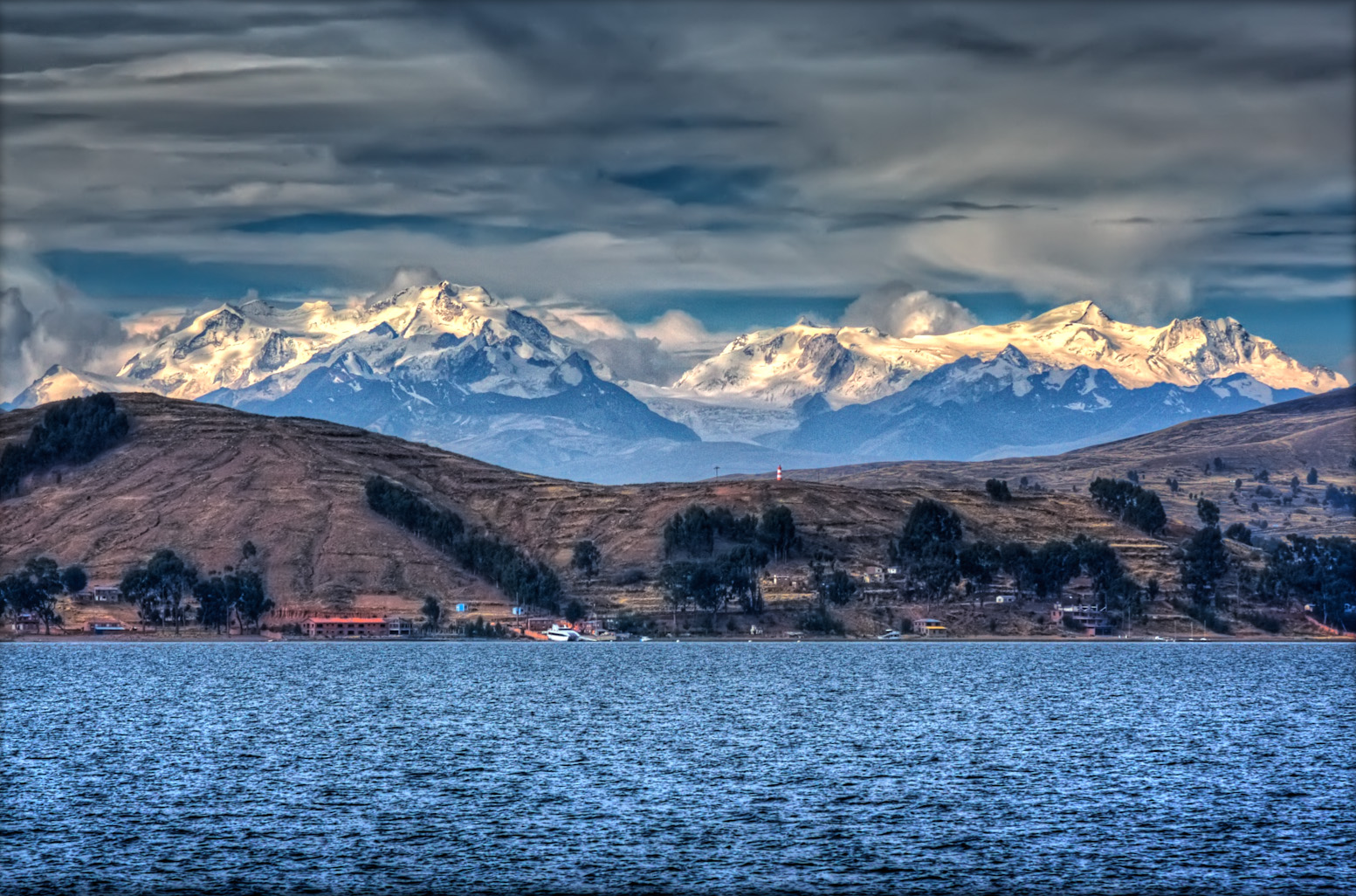
- Ch'iyar Juqhu, Qillwani (center) and Chachakumani as seen from Lake Titicaca

Highest point
- Elevation: 5,828 m (19,121 ft)
- Coordinates: 15°58′36″S 68°23′43″W

Geography
- Location within Bolivia
- Location: Bolivia, La Paz Department
- Parent range: Andes, Cordillera Real

Climbing
- First ascent: 1964, por la cordada integrada por los mendocinos Ulises Sila Vitale, el mayor del ejército Benjamín Nazar, Marcelo Quiroga y Pedro Laurycen.

Qillwani (Aymara qillwa, qiwña, qiwlla Andean gull, -ni a suffix to indicate ownership, "the one with the Andean gull", also spelled Kelluani, Quellhuani, Quelluani) is a 5,828-metre-high (19,121 ft) mountain in the Cordillera Real in the Andes of Bolivia. It is located in the La Paz Department, Larecaja Province, near the western border of the Guanay Municipality. It lies southeast of Ch'iyar Juqhu, northwest of Chachakumani and northeast of Patapatani.

Qillwani (Kellhuani) is also the name of the river which originates southwest of the mountain. Its waters flow to Lake Titicaca along the village of Qillwani (Kellhuani, Kellwani).
