= Wila Wila (Bolivia) =

Mountain in Bolivia

- Location within Bolivia

Highest point
- Elevation: 5,240 m (17,190 ft)
- Coordinates: 15°57′50″S 68°27′46″W

Geography
- Location: Bolivia, La Paz Department
- Parent range: Andes, Cordillera Real

Wila Wila (Aymara wila blood, blood-red, the reduplication indicates that there is a group or a complex of something, "a complex of red color") is a mountain in the Cordillera Real in the Andes of Bolivia, about 5,240 metres (17,192 ft) high. It is located in the La Paz Department, Larecaja Province, Guanay Municipality. It lies north-west of the mountains Chachakumani and Kuntur Jipiña. The lake Jist'aña Quta lies at its feet, south of it.
