= Kimsa Chata (Los Andes) =

Mountain in Bolivia

- Location within Bolivia

Highest point
- Elevation: 5,056 m (16,588 ft)
- Coordinates: 16°6′21″S 68°23′09″W

Geography
- Location: Bolivia; La Paz Department, Los Andes Province
- Parent range: Andes, Cordillera Real

Kimsa Chata (Aymara and Quechua kimsa three, Pukina chata mountain, "three mountains") is a mountain in the Cordillera Real in the Andes of Bolivia, about 5,056 metres (16,588 ft) high. It is located in the La Paz Department, Los Andes Province, Batallas Municipality, Kirani Canton. It is situated south-west of the mountains Wila Lluxi, Warawarani and Phaq'u Kiwuta, between the mountain Qala T'uxu in the north and the lake Q'ara Quta in the south.

It elevation varies from 4500 to 5056 m (approx) in the worlds longest range of the world (Andes) in South America .
