= Wila Kunka Pata =

Mountain in Bolivia

- Location within Bolivia

Highest point
- Elevation: 5,002 m (16,411 ft)
- Coordinates: 16°18′02″S 68°12′40″W

Geography
- Location: Bolivia; La Paz Department, Los Andes Province
- Parent range: Andes

Wila Kunka Pata (Aymara wila blood, blood-red, kunka throat, pata step "red throat step", also spelled Wila Cunca Pata) is a 5,002-metre-high (16,411 ft) mountain in the Bolivian Andes. It is situated in the La Paz Department, Los Andes Province, Pucarani Municipality, west of the Cordillera Real. Wila Kunka Pata lies south-west of the mountain Imilla Apachita and the Kunturiri River.
