= Pallqa K'ark'a =

Mountain in Bolivia

- Location within Bolivia

Highest point
- Elevation: 5,046 m (16,555 ft)
- Coordinates: 15°57′39″S 68°19′36″W

Geography
- Location: Bolivia, La Paz Department, Larecaja Province
- Parent range: Andes, Cordillera Real

Pallqa K'ark'a (Aymara pallqa bifurcation, k'ark'a crevice, fissure, crack, "bifurcation crevice", also spelled Palca Karka) is a 5,046-metre-high (16,555 ft) mountain in the Cordillera Real in the Andes of Bolivia. It is situated in the La Paz Department, Larecaja Province, in the south-west of the Guanay Municipality. Pallqa K'ark'a lies north-east of the mountain Chachakumani at the confluence of the rivers Ch'ijini (Chiquini) and Waraqu (Waraco).
