= Kuntur Jipiña =

Mountain in Bolivia

- Location within Bolivia

Highest point
- Elevation: 5,260 m (17,260 ft)
- Coordinates: 15°59′15″S 68°27′14″W

Geography
- Location: Bolivia, La Paz Department
- Parent range: Andes, Cordillera Real

Kuntur Jipiña (Aymara kunturi condor, jipiña squatting of animals, 'where the condor crouches', Hispanicized spelling Condor Jipina) is a mountain in the Cordillera Real in the Andes of Bolivia, about 5,260 metres (17,257 ft) high. It is located in the La Paz Department, at the border of the Larecaja Province, Guanay Municipality, and the Los Andes Province, Batallas Municipality. It lies west of the mountain Chachakumani and south-east of Wila Wila. The lakes Janq'u Quta and Jist'aña Quta are situated north-east and north-west of Kuntur Jipiña.
