= Qala T'uxu =

Mountain in Bolivian Andes

- Location within Bolivia

Highest point
- Elevation: 5,076 m (16,654 ft)
- Coordinates: 16°4′50″S 68°22′53″W

Geography
- Location: Bolivia, La Paz Department, Los Andes Province, Batallas Municipality
- Parent range: Andes, Cordillera Real

Qala T'uxu or Qala Tuqu (Aymara qala stone, t'uxu window, hole in the wall, tuqu goitre, "stone window" or "stone goitre", also spelled Khala Thojo, Qala Tuju) is a mountain in the Cordillera Real in the Andes of Bolivia, about 5,076 metres (16,654 ft) high. It is located in the La Paz Department, Los Andes Province, Batallas Municipality, Chachacomani Canton. It is situated south-west of the mountains Wila Lluxi and Warawarani and north-west of the mountain Phaq'u Kiwuta.

== See also ==
- Chachakumani
- Janq'u Uyu
- Kunturiri
- Q'ara Quta
