= Ch'iyar Juqhu River =

Ch'iyar Juqhu Chiar Jokho / Chiar Joko
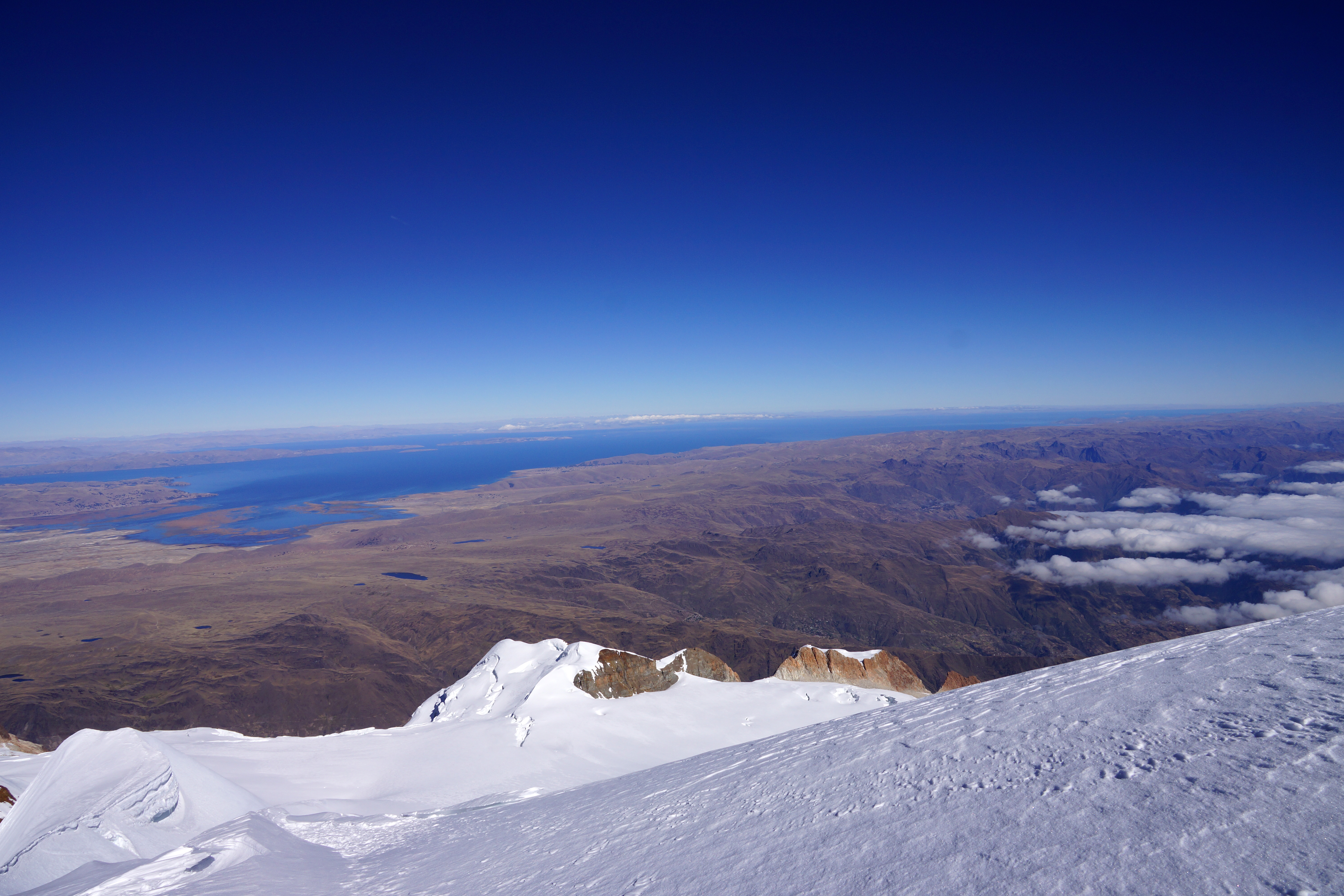
- Lake Titicaca as seen from the summit of Janq'u Uma. The mouth of the Ch'iyar Juqhu River is visible in the left edge of this image.
- Etymology: Aymara

Location
- Country: Bolivia
- Region: La Paz Department

Physical characteristics
- Source: Cordillera Real
  - location: Los Andes Province
- Mouth
  - location: Omasuyos Province, La Paz Department

The Ch'iyar Juqhu River (Aymara Ch'iyar Juqhu Jawira, ch'iyara black, juqhu muddy place, jawira river, "black muddy river", Hispanicized spellings Chiar Jokho, Chiar Joko) is a Bolivian river east of Lake Titicaca in the La Paz Department. It originates in the Cordillera Real near the peaks of the 6,127 m high Ch'iyar Juqhu which is probably named after the river or the region around it and the 5,871 m high Qalsata and flows down towards the Altiplano.

At first the river flows in a southwestern direction. Near the village of Qurpa Putu (Corpa Puto) in the Achacachi Municipality it turns to the northwest unifying with more rivers to end in Lake Titicaca near the mouth of the Jach'a Jawira.

== See also ==
- Achacachi
