= Pariti Island =

Island in Bolivia

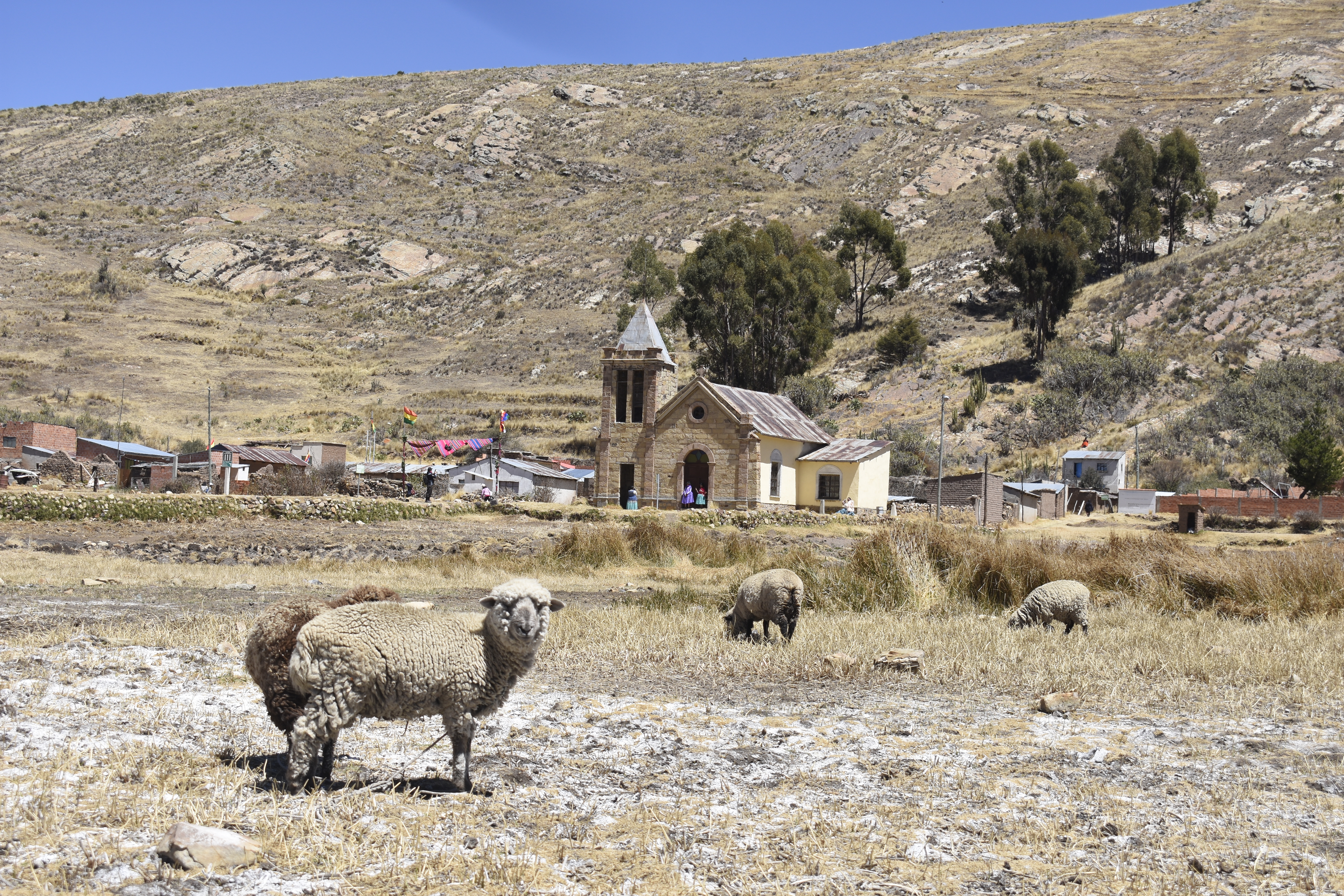
- Interactive map of Pariti Island

Geography
- Coordinates: 16.348194°S 68.741750°W

Administration
- Bolivia
- Province: Los Andes
- Department: La Paz
- Municipality: Puerto Pérez

Pariti Island is an island of Bolivia, situated on Lake Titicaca. It is part of the Puerto Pérez Municipality, Los Andes Province and La Paz Department. The island is located in the southern portion of Lake Titicaca, known as Wiñaymarka Lake.

It is known for being one of the most important ceremonial centers of the ancient Tiwanaku culture, which took place in the Andean Highlands. On the island there is an archaeological museum, Pariti Island Museum, with more than a hundred pieces and objects from the Tiwanaku and Chiripa cultures, dating from 900 to 1050 AD.

To reach Pariti Island it is necessary to take a boat from the town of Quehuaya.
