= Jach'a T'uxu =

Mountain in Bolivia

- Location within Bolivia

Highest point
- Elevation: 5,358 m (17,579 ft)
- Coordinates: 16°01′08″S 68°25′26″W

Geography
- Location: Bolivia, La Paz Department, Los Andes Province, Batallas Municipality
- Parent range: Andes, Cordillera Real

Climbing
- First ascent: 1983

Jach'a T'uxu or Jach'a Tuqu (Aymara jach'a big, t'uxu window, hole in the wall, tuqu goitre, "big window" or "big goitre", Hispanicized spelling Jachcha Thojo) is a 5,358-metre-high (17,579 ft) mountain in the Cordillera Real in the Andes of Bolivia. It lies in the La Paz Department, Los Andes Province, Batallas Municipality. Jach'a T'uxu is situated southwest of Patapatani, northwest of Wari Sipitaña, southwest of T'uxu Loma (or Tuqu Loma) and northeast of Wila Wilani.
