= Taypi K'uchu =

Mountain in Bolivia

- Location within Bolivia

Highest point
- Elevation: 4,928 m (16,168 ft)
- Coordinates: 16°05′13″S 68°25′08″W

Geography
- Location: Bolivia, La Paz Department, Los Andes Province, Batallas Municipality
- Parent range: Andes, Cordillera Real

Taypi K'uchu (Aymara taypi center, middle, k'uchu, q'uch'u corner, "central corner", also spelled Taypi Khuchu) is a 4,928-metre-high (16,168 ft) mountain in the Cordillera Real in the Andes of Bolivia. It is situated in the La Paz Department, Los Andes Province, Batallas Municipality. Taypi K'uchu lies south-west of the mountains Jach'a Juqhu and Ch'iyar T'ikhi and north-west of Qullqi Chata.
