= Wila Umani =

Mountain in Bolivia

- Location within Bolivia

Highest point
- Elevation: 4,438 m (14,560 ft)
- Coordinates: 16°00′25″S 68°12′37″W

Geography
- Location: Bolivia, La Paz Department
- Parent range: Andes

Wila Umani (Aymara wila red, uma water, -ni a suffix to indicate ownership, "the one with red water", also spelled Vila Umani) is a 4,438-metre-high (14,560 ft) mountain in the Andes of Bolivia. It is located in the La Paz Department, Larecaja Province, Guanay Municipality. Wila Umani lies in the eastern extensions of the Cordillera Real. It is situated south-west of Ch'alluma (Challoma, Challana), north of the river Uma Pallqa ("water bifurcation", Uma Palca).
