= Ari Sirka =

Mountain in Bolivia

- Location within Bolivia

Highest point
- Elevation: 4,460 m (14,630 ft)
- Coordinates: 16°08′47″S 68°24′46″W

Geography
- Location: Bolivia, La Paz Department
- Parent range: Andes

Ari Sirka (Aymara ari pointed, sharp, sirka vein of the body or a mine, "pointed vein", also spelled Arisirka) is a mountain in the western extensions of the Cordillera Real in the Andes of Bolivia which reaches a height of approximately 4,460 m (14,630 ft). It is located in the La Paz Department, Los Andes Province, Batallas Municipality. It lies at the Lawrawani Lake.
