= Juri Quta =

Juri Quta may refer to:

- Juri Quta (Batallas), a lake in Bolivia
- Juri Quta (Pukarani), a lake in Bolivia
- Juri Quta, Los Andes, a lake in Bolivia
