= Jisk'a Turini =

Mountain in Bolivia

- Location within Bolivia

Highest point
- Elevation: 4,905 m (16,093 ft)
- Coordinates: 16°04′18″S 68°15′32″W

Geography
- Location: Bolivia, La Paz Department
- Parent range: Andes, Cordillera Real

Jisk'a Turini (Aymara jisk'a small, turi tower, -ni a suffix, Turini a neighboring mountain, "little Turini", "the little one with a tower" or "the one with a little tower", also spelled Jiskha Torrini) is a 4,905-metre-high (16,093 ft) mountain in the Cordillera Real in the Andes of Bolivia. It is located in the La Paz Department, Los Andes Province, in the northeast of the Batallas Municipality. Jisk'a Turini is situated southwest of Turini and southeast of Mullu Apachita. The lakes named Juri Quta and Ch'uxña Quta ("green lake", Chojña Kkota) lie between Mullu Apachita and Jisk'a Turini.
