= Aqhuya Aqhuyani =

Mountain in Bolivia

- Location within Bolivia

Highest point
- Elevation: 5,164 m (16,942 ft)
- Coordinates: 16°01′40″S 68°15′00″W

Geography
- Location: Bolivia, La Paz Department
- Parent range: Andes, Cordillera Real

Aqhuya Aqhuyani (Aymara aqhuya faint, dull, disfigured, tear stained, -ni a suffix to indicate ownership, also spelled Ako Akoani, Akoa Akoani) is a 5,164-metre-high (16,942 ft) peak in the Cordillera Real in the Andes of Bolivia. It is situated in the La Paz Department, Larecaja Province, Guanay Municipality. Aqhuya Aqhuyani lies northeast of Mullu Apachita and northwest of the village of Uma Pallqa (Uma Palca) and Turini.
