= Peñas =

- Town
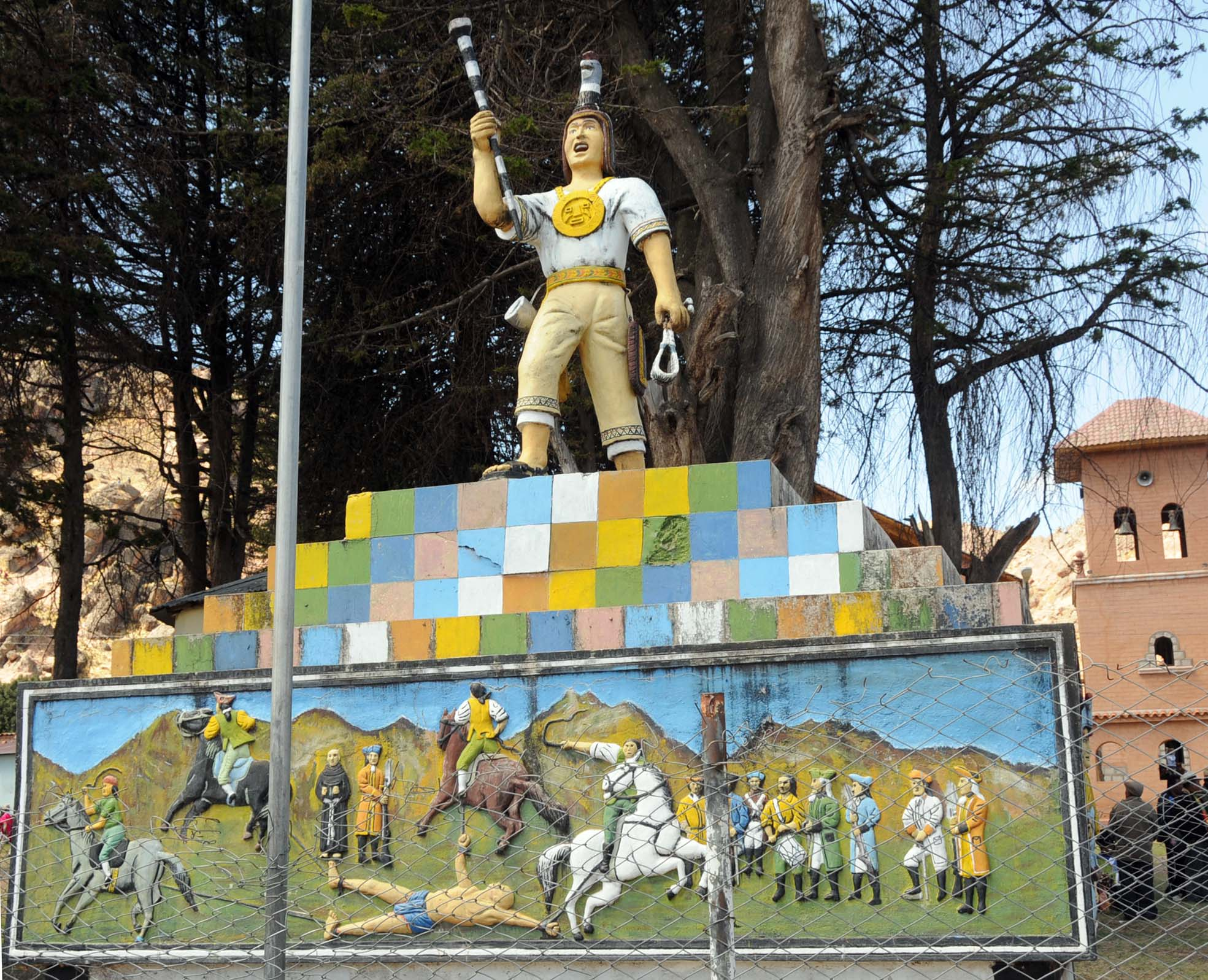
- Tupak Katari monument in Peñas

- Location within Bolivia
- Coordinates: 16°14′S 68°30′W
- Country: Bolivia
- Department: La Paz Department
- Province: Los Andes Province
- Municipality: Batallas Municipality
- Elevation: 13,087 ft (3,989 m)

Population (2001)
  - Total: 439
- Time zone: UTC-4 (BOT)

Peñas is a location in the La Paz Department in Bolivia.
