= Wila Wilani (Los Andes) =

Mountain in Bolivia

- Location within Bolivia

Highest point
- Elevation: 5,250 m (17,220 ft)
- Coordinates: 16°01′21″S 68°26′16″W

Geography
- Location: Bolivia, La Paz Department, Los Andes Province, Batallas Municipality
- Parent range: Andes, Cordillera Real

Wila Wilani (Aymara wila blood, blood-red, the reduplication indicates that there is a group or a complex of something, "the one with a complex of red color") is a 5,250-metre-high (17,224 ft) mountain in the Cordillera Real in the Andes of Bolivia. It is located in the La Paz Department, Los Andes Province, Batallas Municipality, southwest of the mountain Chachakumani. Wila Wilani lies between the rivers Qillwani and Chachakumani. It is situated near the mountains Patapatani and Jach'a T'uxu in the northeast and Wari Sipitaña in the southeast.
