= Puerto Pérez =

Puerto Perez Ch'ililaya
- Town
- Interactive map of Puerto Perez
- Coordinates: 16.2847°S 68.6008°W
- Country: Bolivia
- Department: La Paz Department
- Province: Los Andes Province
- Municipality: Puerto Pérez Municipality

Population (2001)
  - Total: 549
- Time zone: UTC-4 (BOT)

Puerto Perez or Ch'ililaya (Aymara) is a location in the La Paz Department in Bolivia. It is the seat of the Puerto Pérez Municipality, the fourth municipal section of the Los Andes Province.

Historically Chililaya or ch'ililaya has been an important via of connection with La Paz city, in 1879 this location, according with the historian and biographer Nicolas Acosta has been denominated as "La Carretera".
