= Jach'a Pata (Larecaja) =

Mountain in Bolivia

- Location within Bolivia

Highest point
- Elevation: 4,940 m (16,210 ft)
- Coordinates: 16°06′00″S 68°13′11″W

Geography
- Location: Bolivia, La Paz Department, Larecaja Province
- Parent range: Andes, Cordillera Real

Jach'a Pata (Aymara jach'a big, pata step, "big step", Hispanicized spelling Jachcha Pata) is a mountain in the Cordillera Real in the Andes of Bolivia, about 4,940-metre (16,207 ft) high. It is situated in the La Paz Department, Larecaja Province, in the south of the Guanay Municipality. Jach'a Pata lies north-west of the mountain Janq'u K'ark'a and south of the lake Qutapata (Kkota Pata).
