= Qulin Tuqu =

Mountain in Bolivia

- Location within Bolivia

Highest point
- Elevation: 5,368 m (17,612 ft)
- Coordinates: 16°4′30″S 68°17′46″W

Geography
- Location: Bolivia, La Paz Department, Los Andes Province, Batallas Municipality
- Parent range: Andes, Cordillera Real

Climbing
- First ascent: 1970

Qulin Tuqu Aymara quli tousled, tuqu goitre -n a suffix, also spelled Culin Thojo) is a 5,368-metre-high (17,612 ft) mountain in the Cordillera Real in the Andes of Bolivia. It is located in the La Paz Department, Los Andes Province, in the northeastern part of the Batallas Municipality. It is situated southeast of Wila Lluxita and Mullu Apachita.
