= Qullqi Chata =

Mountain in Bolivia

- Location within Bolivia

Highest point
- Elevation: 4,876 m (15,997 ft)
- Coordinates: 16°05′55″S 68°24′39″W

Geography
- Location: Bolivia, La Paz Department, Los Andes Province, Batallas Municipality
- Parent range: Andes, Cordillera Real

Qullqi Chata (Aymara qullqi silver, Pukina chata mountain, "silver mountain", Hispanicized spelling Kholkechata) is a 4,876-metre-high (15,997 ft) mountain in the Cordillera Real in the Andes of Bolivia. It is situated in the La Paz Department, Los Andes Province, Batallas Municipality. Qullqi Chata lies south of the mountain Ch'iyar T'ikhi, west of Kimsa Chata and south-east of Taypi K'uchu. The river Jayllawaya, a tributary of Lake Titicaca, flows along its southern slope.

== See also ==
- Warawarani
