= Imilla Apachita =

Mountain in Bolivia

- Location within Bolivia

Highest point
- Elevation: 5,184 m (17,008 ft)
- Coordinates: 16°16′42″S 68°11′24″W

Geography
- Location: Bolivia; La Paz Department
- Parent range: Andes, Cordillera Real

Imilla Apachita (Aymara mimilla, imilla girl, apachita the place of transit of an important pass in the principal routes of the Andes; name in the Andes for a stone cairn, a little pile of rocks built along the trail in the high mountains, also spelled Imilla Apacheta) is a 5,184-metre-high (17,008 ft) mountain in the Cordillera Real in the Bolivian Andes. It is situated in the La Paz Department, Los Andes Province, Pucarani Municipality. Imilla Apachita lies between the mountains Huayna Potosí in the northeast and Wila Kunka Pata in the southwest.
