= Batallas =

- Town
- Location within Bolivia
- Coordinates: 16°18′S 68°32′W
- Country: Bolivia
- Department: La Paz Department
- Province: Los Andes Province
- Municipality: Batallas Municipality

Population (2001)
  - Total: 1,966
- Time zone: UTC-4 (BOT)

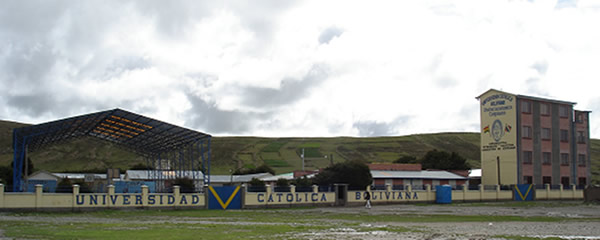
The Universidad Católica Boliviana (UAC) campus in Batallas, Bolivia

Batallas is a location in the La Paz Department in Bolivia. It is the seat of the Batallas Municipality, one of the four municipalities of the Los Andes Province.

== Climate ==
Climate data for Batallas (Huayrocondo), elevation 3,875 m (12,713 ft), (1981–2010)
Month	Jan	Feb	Mar	Apr	May	Jun	Jul	Aug	Sep	Oct	Nov	Dec	Year
Mean daily maximum °C (°F)	15.6 (60.1)	15.8 (60.4)	15.8 (60.4)	16.3 (61.3)	15.6 (60.1)	14.8 (58.6)	14.5 (58.1)	15.2 (59.4)	15.9 (60.6)	16.6 (61.9)	16.9 (62.4)	16.5 (61.7)	15.8 (60.4)
Mean daily minimum °C (°F)	3.9 (39.0)	3.4 (38.1)	2.4 (36.3)	0.3 (32.5)	−3.6 (25.5)	−5.7 (21.7)	−5.5 (22.1)	−4.1 (24.6)	−1.8 (28.8)	0.5 (32.9)	1.4 (34.5)	2.9 (37.2)	−0.5 (31.1)
Average precipitation mm (inches)	148 (5.8)	93 (3.7)	72 (2.8)	21 (0.8)	7 (0.3)	7 (0.3)	7 (0.3)	15 (0.6)	20 (0.8)	39 (1.5)	44 (1.7)	82 (3.2)	555 (21.8)
Source: National Meteorology and Hydrology Service of Peru

Climate data for Copancara (Note: Copancara is located approximately 7 kilometres (4.3 mi) north-west of Batallas.), elevation 3,814 m (12,513 ft), (1990–2011)
Month	Jan	Feb	Mar	Apr	May	Jun	Jul	Aug	Sep	Oct	Nov	Dec	Year
Mean daily maximum °C (°F)	15.6 (60.1)	15.7 (60.3)	15.8 (60.4)	16.2 (61.2)	15.6 (60.1)	15.5 (59.9)	15.1 (59.2)	15.4 (59.7)	15.8 (60.4)	16.2 (61.2)	16.6 (61.9)	16.3 (61.3)	15.8 (60.5)
Daily mean °C (°F)	9.9 (49.8)	9.7 (49.5)	9.5 (49.1)	8.8 (47.8)	6.4 (43.5)	5.4 (41.7)	5.2 (41.4)	6.3 (43.3)	7.9 (46.2)	9.1 (48.4)	9.7 (49.5)	10.1 (50.2)	8.2 (46.7)
Mean daily minimum °C (°F)	4.3 (39.7)	3.8 (38.8)	3.2 (37.8)	1.5 (34.7)	−3.4 (25.9)	−4.7 (23.5)	−4.6 (23.7)	−2.8 (27.0)	0.1 (32.2)	2.0 (35.6)	2.7 (36.9)	3.9 (39.0)	0.5 (32.9)
Average precipitation mm (inches)	136.6 (5.38)	91.4 (3.60)	73.1 (2.88)	15.8 (0.62)	5.8 (0.23)	5.5 (0.22)	3.9 (0.15)	11.8 (0.46)	13.8 (0.54)	28.2 (1.11)	38.9 (1.53)	55.0 (2.17)	479.8 (18.89)
Average precipitation days	14.9	11.0	9.7	2.4	1.0	1.0	0.7	1.7	2.3	3.6	5.1	7.6	61
Average relative humidity (%)	72.7	70.6	67.8	62.2	56.1	58.4	56.5	59.8	59.0	59.8	64.7	67.6	62.9
Source: Servicio Nacional de Meteorología e Hidrología de Bolivia

Climate data for Hichucota Lake, elevation 4,460 m (14,630 ft), (1978–2003)
Month	Jan	Feb	Mar	Apr	May	Jun	Jul	Aug	Sep	Oct	Nov	Dec	Year
Mean daily maximum °C (°F)	12.3 (54.1)	12.5 (54.5)	12.7 (54.9)	13.4 (56.1)	13.8 (56.8)	13.5 (56.3)	13.3 (55.9)	13.5 (56.3)	13.5 (56.3)	13.6 (56.5)	13.6 (56.5)	13.5 (56.3)	13.3 (55.9)
Daily mean °C (°F)	6.8 (44.2)	6.8 (44.2)	6.8 (44.2)	6.8 (44.2)	6.1 (43.0)	5.0 (41.0)	4.4 (39.9)	4.8 (40.6)	5.3 (41.5)	6.3 (43.3)	6.9 (44.4)	7.2 (45.0)	6.1 (43.0)
Mean daily minimum °C (°F)	1.3 (34.3)	1.2 (34.2)	0.8 (33.4)	0.2 (32.4)	−1.7 (28.9)	−3.5 (25.7)	−4.4 (24.1)	−3.9 (25.0)	−2.9 (26.8)	−1.1 (30.0)	0.2 (32.4)	0.9 (33.6)	−1.1 (30.1)
Average precipitation mm (inches)	169.2 (6.66)	124.6 (4.91)	91.4 (3.60)	47.7 (1.88)	16.4 (0.65)	16.8 (0.66)	6.0 (0.24)	15.9 (0.63)	17.7 (0.70)	36.4 (1.43)	62.0 (2.44)	74.1 (2.92)	678.2 (26.72)
Average precipitation days	21.8	17.7	15.4	8.5	2.7	2.5	1.4	3.4	4.0	8.0	10.3	12.0	107.7
Average relative humidity (%)	73.1	72.2	70.5	65.6	59.5	59.1	57.3	58.8	60.0	63.8	65.4	68.8	64.5
Source: Servicio Nacional de Meteorología e Hidrología de Bolivia
