= Puerto Pérez Municipality =

Coordinates: 16.3333°S 68.5833°W

Puerto Pérez Ch'ililaya
- Municipality
- Interactive map of Puerto Pérez
- Country: Bolivia
- Department: La Paz Department
- Province: Los Andes Province
- Seat: Puerto Pérez

Population (2001)
  - Total: 7,830
- Time zone: UTC-4 (BOT)

Puerto Pérez or Ch'ililaya (Aymara) is the fourth municipal section of the Los Andes Province in the La Paz Department, Bolivia. Its seat is Puerto Pérez.

The municipality includes the island lakes of Suriqui, Pariti and Lakahuta on Lake Titicaca.
