= Suriqui Island =

Island in Bolivia

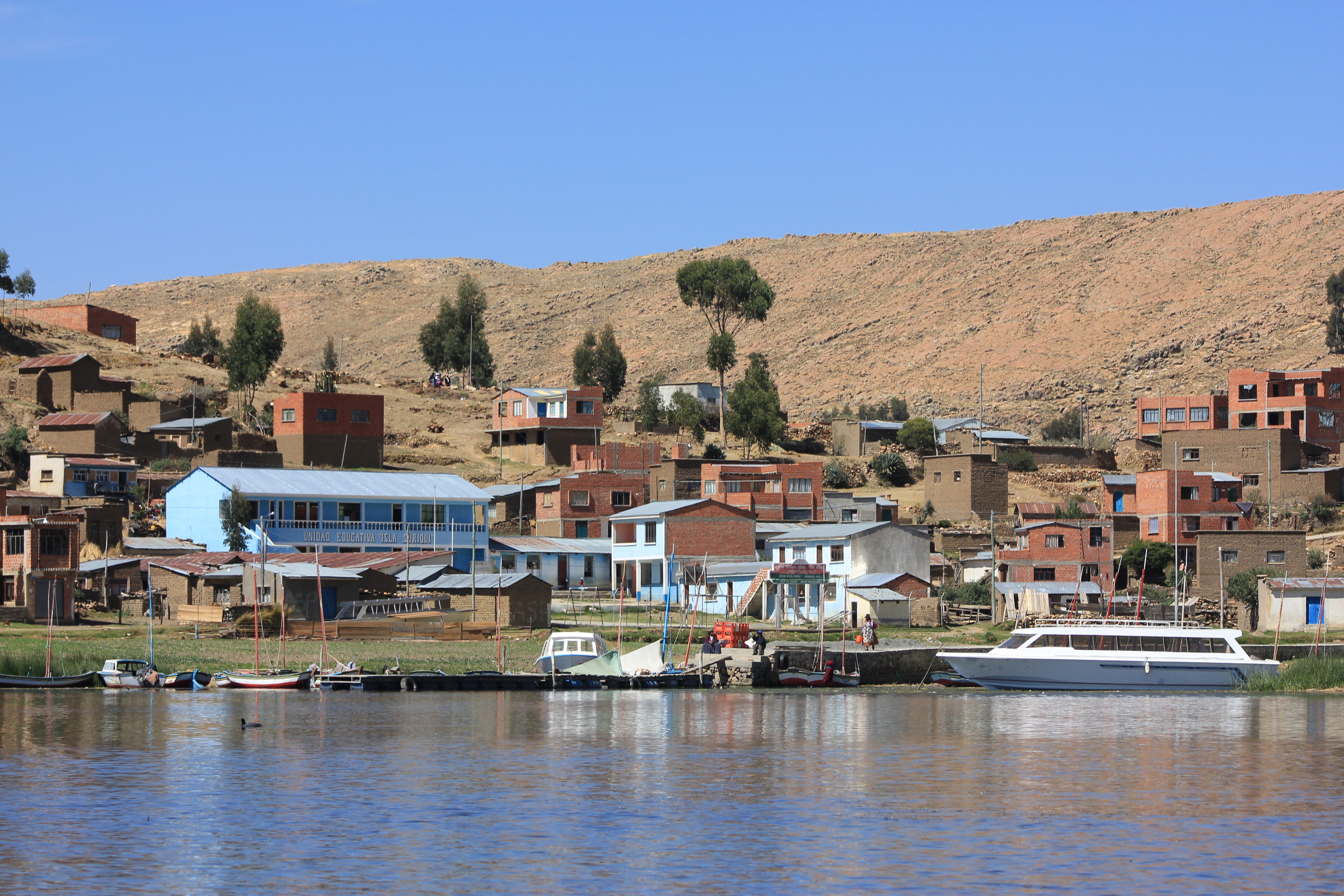
- Interactive map of Suriqui Island

Geography
- Coordinates: 16°18′14″S 68°45′56″W

Administration
- Bolivia
- Province: Los Andes
- Department: La Paz
- Municipality: Puerto Pérez

Suriqui Island is an island of Bolivia, situated on Lake Titicaca. It is part of the Puerto Pérez Municipality, Los Andes Province and La Paz Department. The island is located in the southern portion of Lake Titicaca, known as Wiñaymarka Lake. The island is a notable tourist attraction, where rafts made from totora have been constructed to navigate the lake since ancient times.

Reed boat craftsmen from Suriqui helped Thor Heyerdahl construct Ra II and Tigris reed boats. Thor Heyerdahl attempted to prove that the reed boats of Lake Titicaca derived from the papyrus boats of Egypt.

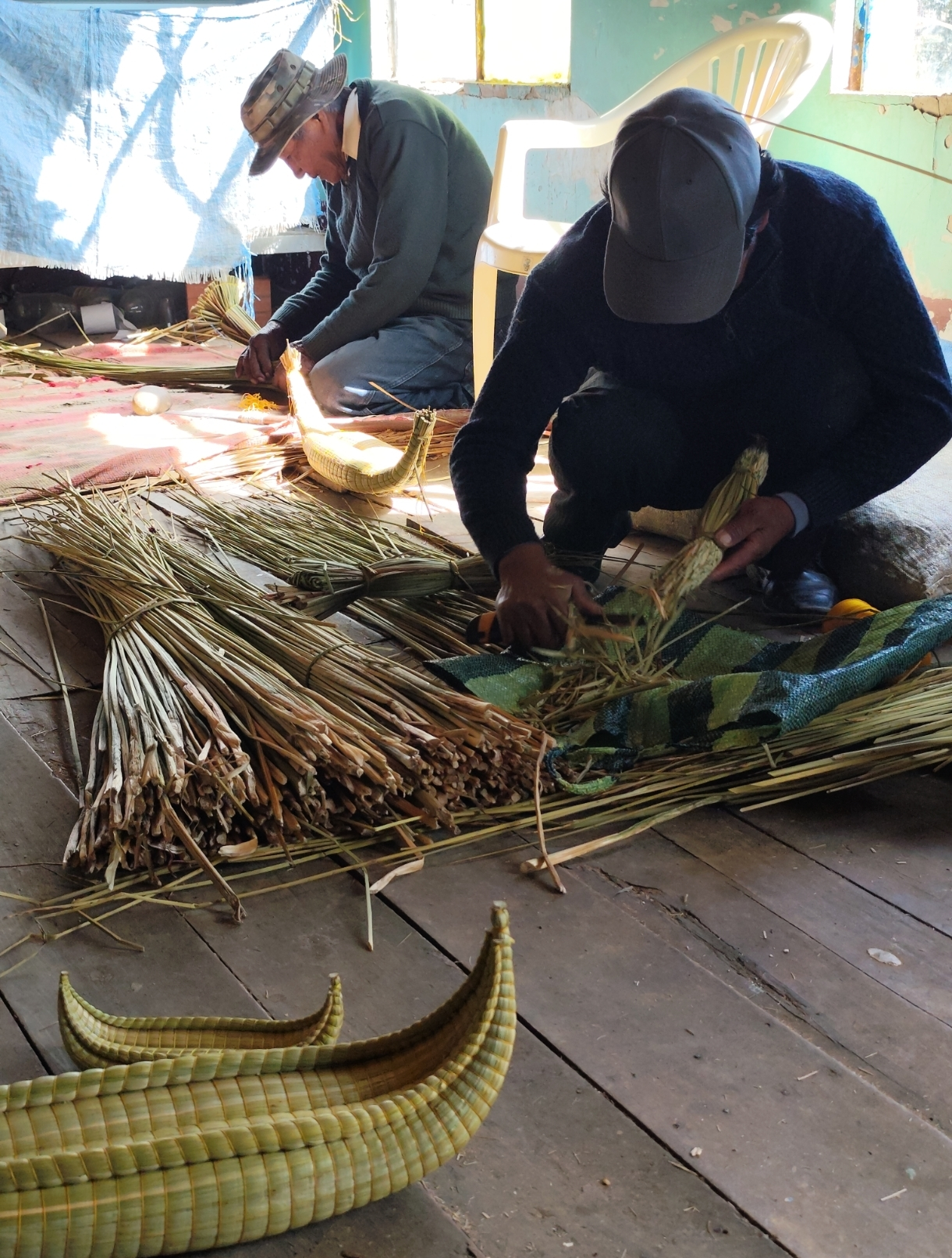
Artesans working with totora
