= Kimsa Phujru =

Mountain in Bolivia

- Location within Bolivia

Highest point
- Elevation: 4,220 m (13,850 ft)
- Coordinates: 16°07′00″S 68°28′00″W

Geography
- Location: Bolivia, La Paz Department
- Parent range: Andes

Kimsa Phujru (Aymara kimsa three, phujru hole or pit in the earth without water, "three holes", also spelled Quimsa Phujru) is a mountain in the western extensions of the Cordillera Real in the Andes of Bolivia which reaches a height of approximately 4,220 m (13,850 ft). It is in the La Paz Department, Los Andes Province, Batallas Municipality. Kimsa Phujru lies at the Pura Purani River, an affluent of the Qiqa Jawira.
