= Turini (Larecaja) =

Mountain in Bolivia

- Location within Bolivia

Highest point
- Elevation: 5,064 m (16,614 ft)
- Coordinates: 16°02′34″S 68°14′37″W

Geography
- Location: Bolivia, La Paz Department, Larecaja Province
- Parent range: Andes, Cordillera Real

Turini (Aymara turi tower, -ni a suffix to indicate ownership, "the one with a tower", also spelled Torrini) is a 5,064-metre-high (16,614 ft) mountain in the Cordillera Real in the Andes of Bolivia. It is located in the La Paz Department, Larecaja Province, Guanay Municipality. Turini lies northwest of the river Uma Pallqa ("water bifurcation", Uma Palca) and the village of Uma Pallqa. It is situated northeast of Jisk'a Turini ("little Turini").

== See also ==
- Ñuñuni Qalani
