= Ñuñuni Qalani =

Mountain in Bolivia

- Location within Bolivia

Highest point
- Elevation: 4,940 m (16,210 ft)
- Coordinates: 16°03′56″S 68°12′28″W

Geography
- Location: Bolivia, La Paz Department
- Parent range: Andes, Cordillera Real

Ñuñuni Qalani (Aymara ñuñu breast, qala stone, -ni a suffix to indicate ownership, also spelled Nununi Khalani) is a mountain in the Andes of Bolivia, about 4,940 metres (16,207 ft) high. It is located in the La Paz Department, Larecaja Province, Guanay Municipality. Ñuñuni Qalani lies in the eastern extensions of the Cordillera Real. It is situated south-east of the river Uma Pallqa ("water bifurcation", Uma Palca) and the village of Uma Pallqa.
