= Mullu Apachita =

Mountain in Bolivia

- Location within Bolivia

Highest point
- Elevation: 5,368 m (17,612 ft)
- Coordinates: 16°3′52″S 68°17′20″W

Geography
- Location: Bolivia, La Paz Department, Los Andes Province, Batallas Municipality
- Parent range: Andes, Cordillera Real

Mullu Apachita (Aymara mullu colored stone like a coral with which they make necklaces, apachita the place of transit of an important pass in the principal routes of the Andes; name in the Andes for a stone cairn, a little pile of rocks built along the trail in the high mountains, Hispanicized spelling Mullu Apacheta) is a mountain in the Cordillera Real in the Andes of Bolivia, about 5,368 metres (17,612 ft) high. It is located in the La Paz Department at the border of the Larecaja Province, Guanay Municipality, and the Los Andes Province, Batallas Municipality. It is situated southeast of the mountains Wila Lluxita and Janq'u Uyu.

== See also ==
- Aqhuya Aqhuyani
- Chachakumani
- Kunturiri
- Q'ara Quta
- Turini
