= Guanay Municipality =

- Municipality
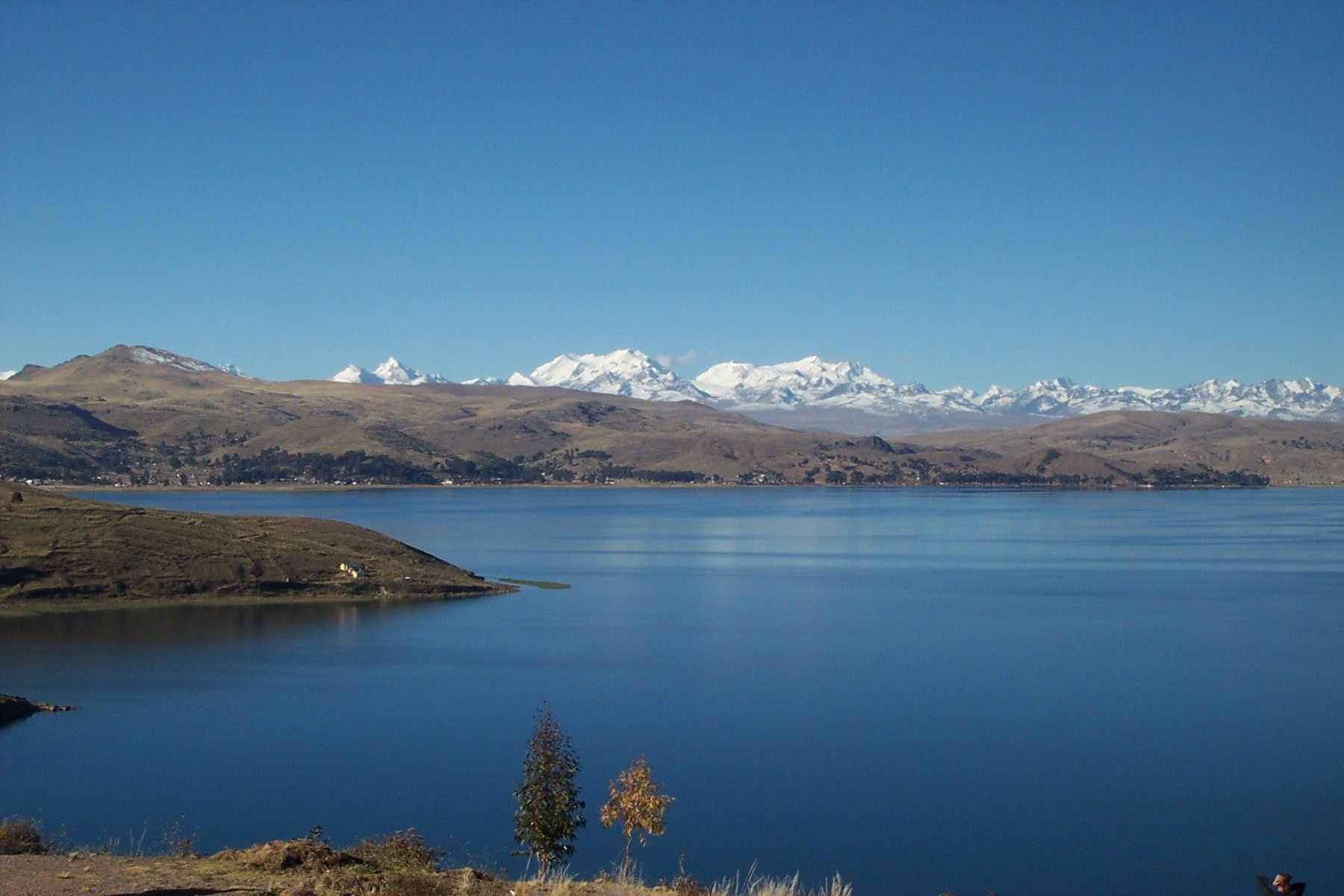
- The Cordillera Real as seen from Lake Titicaca with Chachakumani and Ch'iyar Juqhu of the Guanay Municipality in the center

- Flag

- Location of the Viacha Municipality within Bolivia
- Coordinates: 15.4947°S 67.900°W
- Country: Bolivia
- Department: La Paz Department
- Province: Larecaja Province
- Seat: Guanay

Government
  - Mayor: Eddy Loayza Guzmán (2007)
  - President: Lady Saavedra de Chávez (2007)

Area
  - Total: 1,510 sq mi (3,911 km^{2})
- Elevation: 1,600 ft (500 m)

Population (2001)
  - Total: 11,528
- Time zone: UTC-4 (BOT)

Guanay Municipality (Aymara: Wanay) is the second municipal section of the Larecaja Province in the La Paz Department, Bolivia. Its seat is Guanay.

== Geography ==
The Cordillera Real traverses the Guanay Municipality. Some of the highest peaks of the range, Chachakumani and Ch'iyar Juqhu, lie within the borders of the municipality. More mountains are listed below:

- Aqhuya Aqhuyani
- Chachakumani
- Ch'iyar Juqhu
- Imasiña
- Jach'a Pata
- Janq'u K'ark'a
- Kuntur Jipiña
- Ñuñuni Qalani
- Pallqa K'ark'a
- Patapatani
- Qillwani
- Turini
- Wari Qalluni Pata
- Wila Lluxita
- Wila Umani
- Wila Wila

== Languages ==
The languages spoken in the Guanay Municipality are mainly Spanish, Aymara and Quechua.

Language	Inhabitants
Quechua	1.653
Aymara	3.405
Guaraní	5
Another native	94
Spanish	10.064
Foreign	86
Only native	737
Native and Spanish	4.123
Only Spanish	5.942

Ref.: obd.descentralizacion.gov.bo

== See also ==
- Janq'u Quta
