= Janq'u Uyu =

Mountain in Bolivia

- Location within Bolivia

Highest point
- Elevation: 5,512 m (18,084 ft)
- Coordinates: 16°03′06″S 68°19′23″W

Geography
- Location: Bolivia, La Paz Department, Los Andes Province, Batallas Municipality
- Parent range: Andes, Cordillera Real

Climbing
- First ascent: 1-1970: S.W. face-1971: S. face-1975.

Janq'u Uyu (Aymara janq'u white, uyu yard for livestock, "white yard", Hispanicized spelling Jankho Huyo, Janko Huyo) is a mountain in the Andes, about 5,512 m (18,084 ft) high, located in the Cordillera Real of Bolivia in the La Paz Department, Los Andes Province, Batallas Municipality, Chachakumani Canton on the border with Larecaja Province, Guanay Municipality, Challana Canton. It is situated at the very end of the Janq'u Quta valley between Jisk'a Pata in the north-west and Wila Lluxita in the east, north of Wila Lluxi and Phaq'u Kiwuta.

== See also ==
- Kunturiri
- Q'ara Quta
- List of mountains in the Andes
