= Chearoco =

Mountain in Bolivia

- Chiaraco, Chiaroco
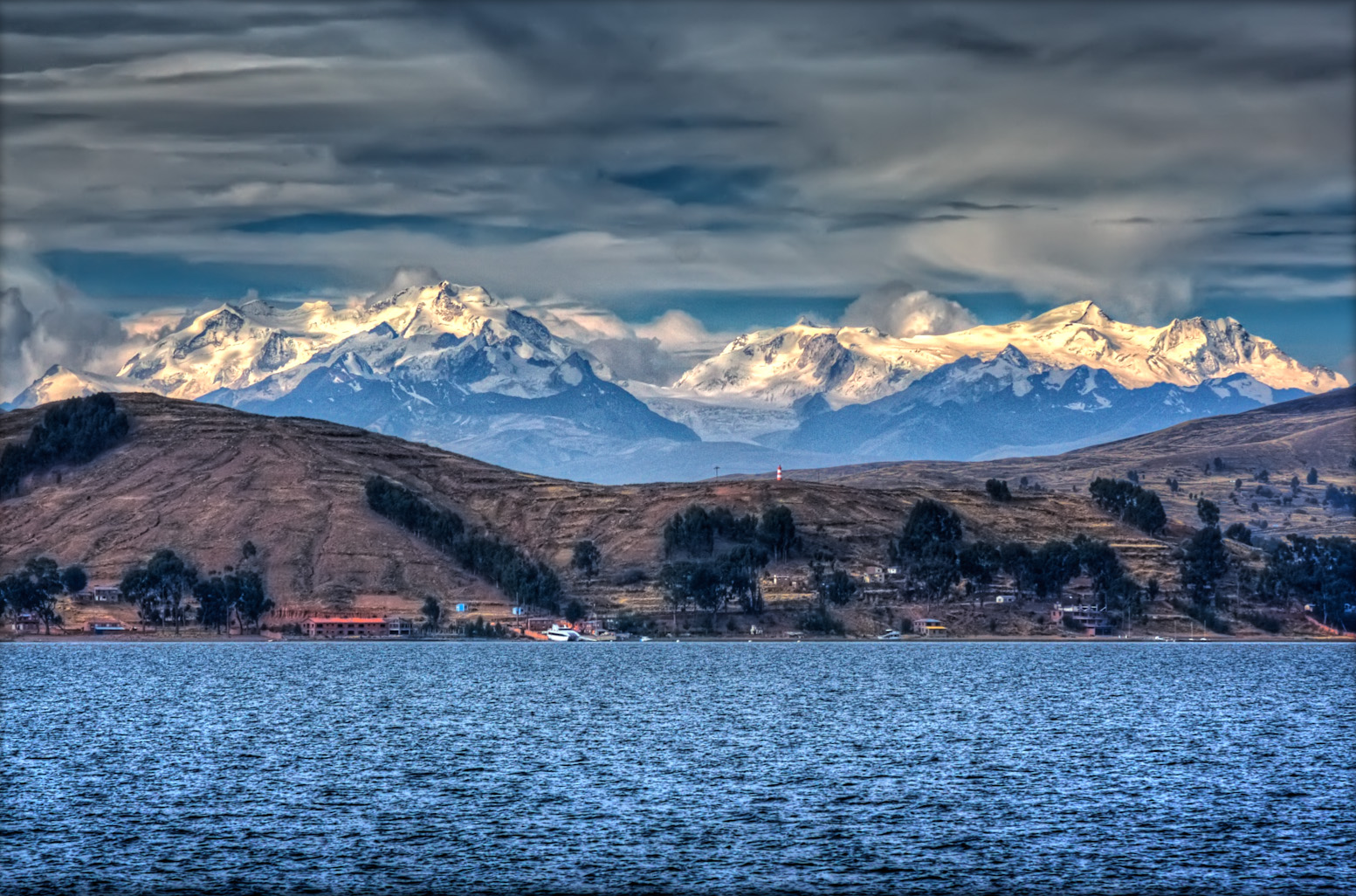
- The Cordillera Real as seen from Lake Titicaca showing Chearoco and Chachacomani

Highest point
- Elevation: 6,127 m (20,102 ft)
- Prominence: 1,055 m (3,461 ft)
- Parent peak: Ancohuma
- Coordinates: 15°57′00″S 68°24′56″W

Geography
- Location within Bolivia
- Location: Bolivia, La Paz Department, Larecaja Province
- Parent range: Andes, Cordillera Real

Climbing
- First ascent: 06/25/1928 - Erwin Hein (Austria), Alfred Horeschowski, Hugo Hoertnagel, and Hans Pfann (Germany)

Chearoco, Chiaraco or Chiaroco (all possibly from Aymara ch'iyara black, juqhu muddy place) is a mountain in the Cordillera Real in the Andes of Bolivia. It has a height of about 6,127 m (20,102 ft). It is situated in the La Paz Department, Larecaja Province, Guanay Municipality, southeast of the peak of Aman Pata. Chearoco lies between Qalsata in the northwest and Chachakumani in the southeast.

The Aymara name of the mountain correlates with the names of the nearby area (Chiar Jokho) and the river Ch'iyar Juqhu (Chiar Jokho, Chiar Joko) which originates near the mountain.

== First Ascent ==
Chearoko was first climbed by Erwin Hein (Austria), Alfred Horeschowski, Hugo Hoertnagel and Hans Pfann (Germany) 25 June 1928.

== Elevation ==
Other data from available digital elevation models: ASTER 6078 metres and TanDEM-X 6106 metres. The height of the nearest key col is 5049 meters, leading to a topographic prominence of 1055 meters. Chearoko is considered a Mountain Massif according to the Dominance System and its dominance is 17.28%. Its parent peak is Ancohuma and the Topographic isolation is 18.4 kilometers.

== See also ==
- List of mountains in the Andes
