= Wari Umaña =

Mountain in Bolivia

- Location within Bolivia

Highest point
- Elevation: 5,264 m (17,270 ft)
- Coordinates: 16°00′40″S 68°23′28″W

Geography
- Location: Bolivia, La Paz Department, Los Andes Province, Batallas Municipality
- Parent range: Andes, Cordillera Real

Climbing
- First ascent: 1983

Wari Umaña (Aymara wari vicuña, umaña drink, to give to drink, "vicuña watering place", Hispanicized spelling Huari Umaña) is a 5,264-metre-high (17,270 ft) mountain in the Cordillera Real in the Andes of Bolivia. It lies in the La Paz Department, Los Andes Province, Batallas Municipality. Wari Umaña is situated at the Chachakumani River, north of the mountain Jach'a Juqhu.

== See also ==
- Chachakumani
- List of mountains in the Andes
