= Batallas Municipality =

Batallas
- Municipality
- Interactive map of Batallas
- Coordinates: 16°15′S 68°25′W
- Country: Bolivia
- Department: La Paz Department
- Province: Los Andes Province
- Seat: Batallas

Population (2001)
  - Total: 18.693
  - Ethnicities: Aymara
- Time zone: UTC-4 (BOT)

Batallas Municipality is the third municipal section of the Los Andes Province in the La Paz Department, Bolivia. Its capital is Batallas.

== Geography ==
The Cordillera Real traverses the Batallas Municipality. Some of the highest mountains of the municipality are listed below:

- Ari Sirka
- Ch'iyar T'ikhi
- Jach'a Juqhu
- Jach'a Pata
- Jach'a Qullu
- Jach'a T'uxu
- Jisk'a Pata
- Jisk'a Turini
- Juqhun K'ark'a
- Kimsa Chata
- Kimsa Phujru
- Kuntur Jipiña
- Laram Salla
- Mich'ini
- Mullu Apachita
- Patapatani
- Pura Purani
- Phaq'u Kiwuta
- Qala T'uxu
- Qawiña
- Qulin Tuqu
- Qullqi Chata
- Q'ara Quta
- Taypi K'uchu
- Tira K'ark'a
- Warawarani
- Wari Sipitaña
- Wari Umaña
- Wila Lluxi
- Wila Wilani
- Wintanani

== Languages ==
The languages spoken in the Batallas Municipality are mainly Aymara, Spanish and Quechua.

Language	Inhabitants
Quechua	181
Aymara	18,360
Guaraní	6
Another native	14
Spanish	13,336
Foreign	66
Only native	6,585
Native and Spanish	11,816
Only Spanish	1,525

== See also ==
- Jach'a Jawira
- Janq'u Quta
- Lawrawani Lake
- Q'ara Quta
