= Jisk'a Pata =

Mountain in Bolivia

- Location within Bolivia

Highest point
- Elevation: 5,508 m (18,071 ft)
- Coordinates: 16°02′11″S 68°20′22″W

Geography
- Location: Bolivia, La Paz Department, Los Andes Province, Batallas Municipality
- Parent range: Andes, Cordillera Real

Climbing
- First ascent: 1-1971 via S. face: S.E. face-1975.

Jisk'a Pata (Aymara jisk'a small, pata stone bench, step, "little stone step", Hispanicized spelling Jiskha Pata) is a 5,508-metre-high (18,071 ft) mountain in the Cordillera Real in the Andes of Bolivia. It is located in the La Paz Department, Los Andes Province, Batallas Municipality, Kirani Canton. It is situated between the mountains Jallawaya in the west and Janq'u Uyu in the south-east, north of Warawarani, Wila Lluxi and Phaq'u Kiwuta, all of them higher than 5,000 m.

== See also ==
- Kunturiri
- Q'ara Quta
- List of mountains in the Andes
