= Patapatani =

Mountain in Bolivia

- Location within Bolivia

Highest point
- Elevation: 5,452 m (17,887 ft)
- Coordinates: 16°00′31″S 68°25′15″W

Geography
- Location: Bolivia, La Paz Department, Los Andes Province, Batallas Municipality
- Parent range: Andes, Cordillera Real

Patapatani (Aymara patapata many steps, -ni a suffix to indicate ownership, "the one with many steps") is a 5,452-metre-high (17,887 ft) mountain in the Cordillera Real in the Andes of Bolivia. It is located in the La Paz Department, at the border of the Larecaja Province, Guanay Municipality, and the Los Andes Province, Batallas Municipality. Patapatani lies between the rivers Qillwani and Chachakumani, north-east of the mountain Wila Wilani.
