= Wila Lluxita =

Mountain in Bolivia

- Location within Bolivia

Highest point
- Elevation: 5,244 m (17,205 ft)
- Coordinates: 16°3′5″S 68°17′49″W

Geography
- Location: Bolivia, La Paz Department, Larecaja Province, Guanay Municipality
- Parent range: Andes, Cordillera Real

Climbing
- First ascent: 1970

Wila Lluxita (Aymara wila blood, blood-red, lluxi shell of a mussel; landslide, -ta a suffix, also spelled Wila Luxita, Wila Llojeta, Huilallojeta) is a 5,244-metre-high (17,205 ft) mountain in the Andes. It is located in the Cordillera Real of Bolivia in the La Paz Department, Larecaja Province, Guanay Municipality. It is situated at the end of the Janq'u Quta valley between Janq'u Laya and Janq'u Uyu in the west and Mullu Apachita in the southeast, all of them higher than 5,000 m.

== See also ==
- Jisk'a Pata
- Phaq'u Kiwuta
- Q'ara Quta
- Warawarani
- Wila Lluxi
- List of mountains in the Andes
