= Los Andes Province (Bolivia) =

Los Andes
- Province
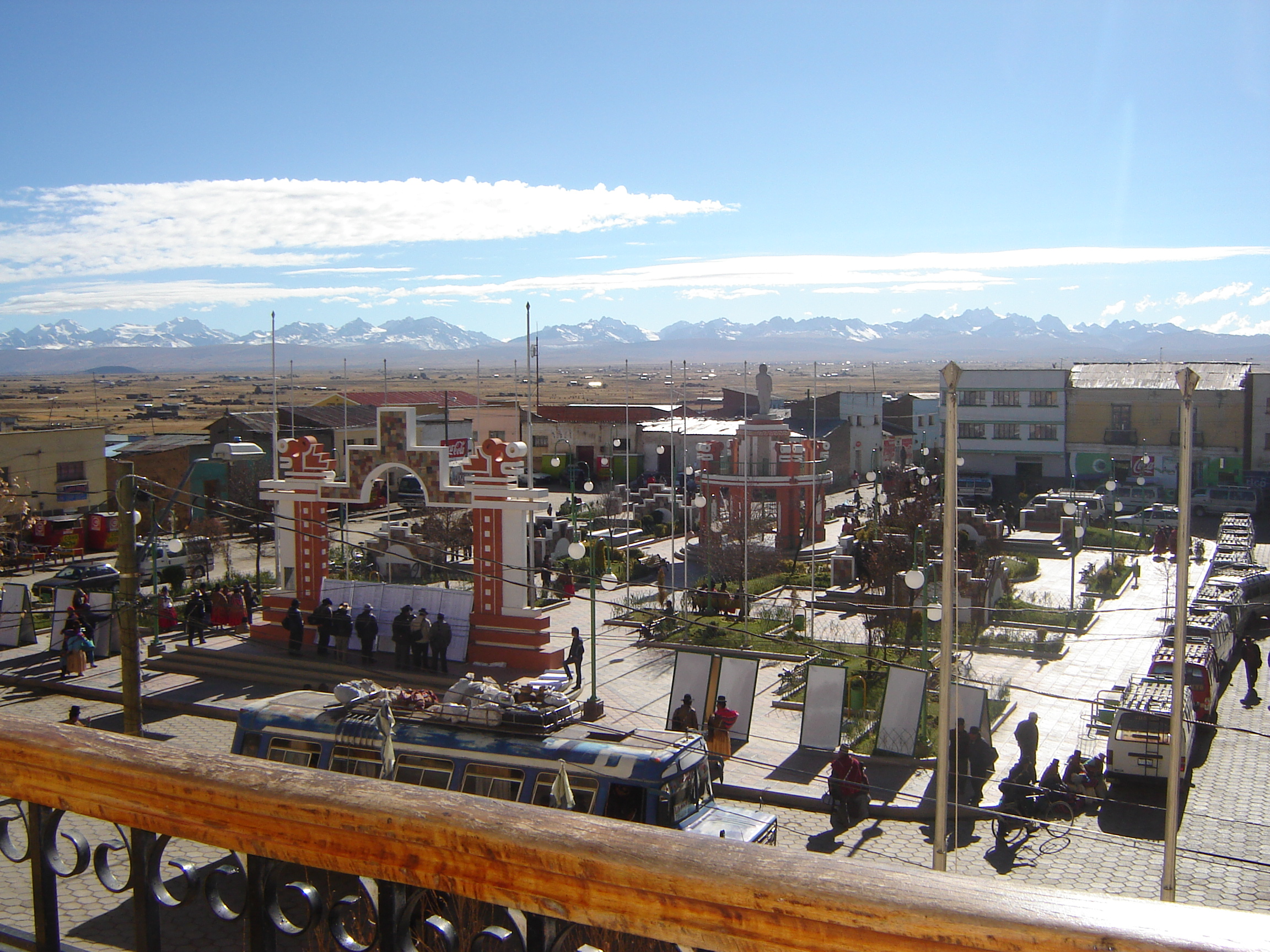
- Pucarani with the Cordillera Real in the background

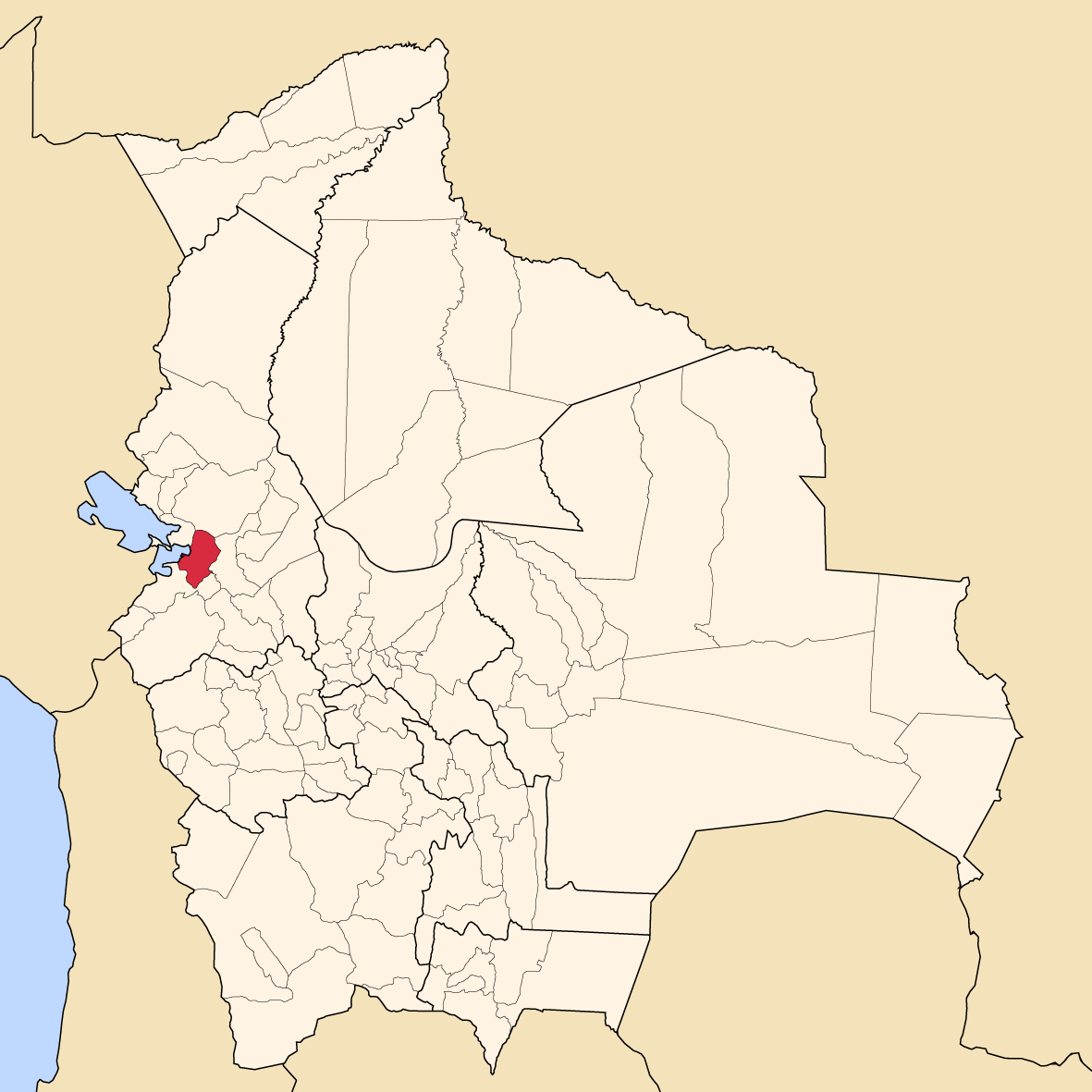
- Location of Los Andes Province within Bolivia

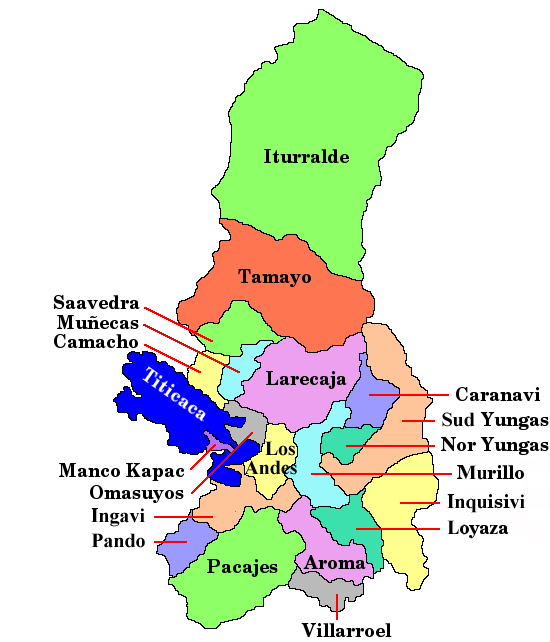
- Provinces of the La Paz Department
- Coordinates: 16°20′0″S 68°25′0″W
- Country: Bolivia
- Department: La Paz Department
- Municipalities: 4
- Founded: November 24, 1917
- Capital: Pucarani

Area
  - Total: 1,658 km^{2} (640 sq mi)

Population (2024 census)
  - Total: 116,690
  - Density: 70.38/km^{2} (182.3/sq mi)
  - Ethnicities: Aymara Quechua
- Time zone: UTC-4 (BOT)
- Website: Official website

Los Andes is one of the twenty provinces in the central parts of the Bolivian La Paz Department. The province was legally founded on November 24, 1917, during the presidency of José Gutiérrez Guerra. The Spanish name of the province means "The Andes", referring to its position within the Cordillera Real which is part of the Bolivian Andes mountain range. The capital of the province is Pucarani, which has a population of 918 as of the 2001 census. Pucarani is situated in the Altiplano west of the Cordillera Real offering a view of some of its highest mountains such as Ch'iyar Juqhu, Chachakumani, Kunturiri, Wayna Potosí and Chacaltaya.

== Location ==
The province is located between 16° 00' and 16° 47' South and between 68° 08' and 68° 45' West. It extends over 90 km from north to south, and 75 km from east to west.

It is situated on the south-eastern shores of Lake Titicaca and borders Omasuyos Province in the northwest, Ingavi Province in the south, Pedro Domingo Murillo Province in the east and Larecaja Province in the north.

== Geography ==
One of the highest peaks of the province is Kunturiri. Other mountains are listed below:

- Ari Sirka
- Asir Kunka
- Ch'iyar Qullu
- Ch'iyar T'ikhi
- Imasiña
- Imilla Apachita
- Jach'a Jipiña
- Jach'a Juqhu
- Jach'a Pata
- Jach'a Qullu
- Jach'a T'uxu
- Jach'a Wankarani
- Jani Lawani
- Jisk'a Turini
- Jist'aña
- Juqhun K'ark'a
- Kimsa Chata
- Kimsa Phujru
- Kuntur Jipiña
- Laram Salla
- Mich'ini
- Mullu Apachita
- Nasa Q'ara
- Nasa Q'ara (Wawanaki)
- Patapatani
- Pura Purani
- Pura Purani T'uxu
- Phaq'u Kiwuta
- Phujtir Pata Punta
- Qala P'axrani
- Qala T'uxu
- Qawiña
- Qulin Tuqu
- Qullpani
- Qullqi Chata
- Q'ilani
- Taypi K'uchu
- Tira K'ark'a
- Tira Qullu
- Turini
- Warawarani
- Wari Sipitaña
- Wari Umaña
- Wawanaki
- Wila Kunka Pata
- Wila Lluxi
- Wila Wilani
- Wintanani

== Population ==
The population of the Los Andes Province has increased by 20% over the recent two decades:

- 1992: 62,185 inhabitants (census)
- 2001: 69,636 inhabitants (census)
- 2023: 78,579 inhabitants (census)
- 2024: 116,690inhabitants (census)

96.2% of the population speak Aymara, 63.8% speak Spanish, and 0.1% Quechua. (2001) Most of the people are bilingual, they speak Aymara and Spanish.

The literacy rate of the province's population is 81.1%, with 90.6% among males and 72.4% among females. (2001)

Infant mortality from 1992 (6.8%) to 2001 (7.3%) has remained high over that decade.

63.5% of the population have no access to electricity, 70.1% have no sanitary facilities. (2001)

57.5% of the households have a radio, 13.0% a TV-set, 32.4% a bike, 1.1% a motorbike, 2.5% a car, 0.4% a fridge, 0.9% a phone. (2001)

71.5% of the population are Catholics, 24.2% are Protestants. (1992)

== Division ==
The province comprises four municipalities which are further subdivided into cantons.

Municipality	Inhabitants (2005, est.)	Seat
Pucarani Municipality	29,311	Pucarani
Laja Municipality	17,445	Laja
Batallas Municipality	19,821	Batallas
Puerto Pérez Municipality	8,116	Puerto Pérez

== Places of interest ==
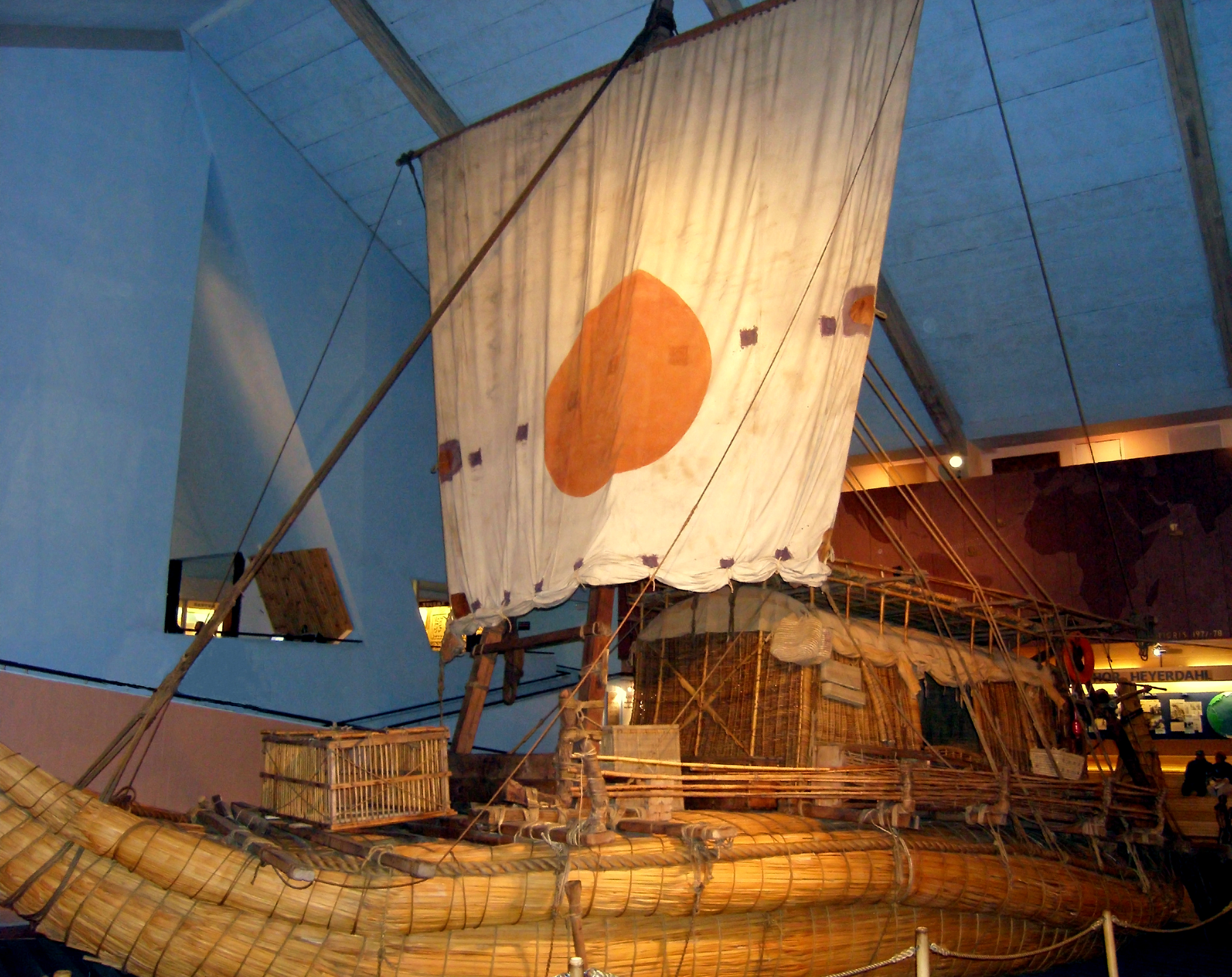
Thor Heyerdahl's Ra II in the Kon-Tiki Museum (Oslo, Norway)

Suriqui Island is known for the construction of balsas, totora boats which are still used on Lake Titicaca in Bolivia and Peru. The Ra II is famous for Thor Heyerdahl's successful trans-Atlantic voyage from Morocco to Barbados.

== See also ==
- Allqa Quta
- Ch'iyar Juqhu River
- Ch'iyar Quta
- Juri Quta
- Taypi Chaka Quta
