= Phaq'u Kiwuta =

Mountain in Bolivia

- Location within Bolivia

Highest point
- Elevation: 5,589 m (18,337 ft)
- Coordinates: 16°5′17″S 68°20′44″W

Geography
- Location: Bolivia, La Paz Department, Los Andes Province, Batallas Municipality
- Parent range: Andes, Cordillera Real

Climbing
- First ascent: 1-?(cairn found): N.W. face-1971.

Phaq'u Kiwuta (Aymara phaq'u, paqu, p'aqu light brown, reddish, blond, dark chestnut, kiwu canine tooth or tusk, -ta a suffix, other spellings Pacokeuta, Paco Keuta, Pakokiuta, Pakokiwuta) is a mountain in the Andes, about 5,589 m (18,337 ft) high. It is located in the Cordillera Real of Bolivia in the La Paz Department, Los Andes Province, Batallas Municipality, Kirani Canton. It is situated south-west of the mountain Wila Lluxi, south-east of Warawarani and north of a lake named Quta Thiya in some maps. Other prominent mountains nearby are Jisk'a Pata and Janq'u Uyu in the north, and Wila Lluxita and Mullu Apachita in the north-east, all of them higher than 5,000 m.

== See also ==
- Janq'u Quta
- Kunturiri
- Q'ara Quta
- List of mountains in the Andes
