= Q'ara Quta (La Paz) =

Lake in Bolivia

- Location within Bolivia
- Location: Bolivia, La Paz Department, Los Andes Province, Batallas Municipality
- Coordinates: 16°9′S 68°22′W
- Max. length: 5 km (3.1 mi)
- Max. width: 0.65 km (0.40 mi)
- Surface elevation: 4,400 m (14,400 ft)

Q'ara Quta (Aymara q'ara bare, bald, quta lake, "bare lake", Hispanicized spellings Karakota, Khara Khota, Khara Kkota, K'arakota) is a lake on the western side of the Cordillera Real of Bolivia located in the La Paz Department, Los Andes Province, Batallas Municipality, Comunidad Alto Peñas. It lies north-west of the Kunturiri massif, between the lakes Wichhu Quta (5 km) in the south-west and Khotia Quta and Janq'u Quta in the north-east. The lakes are connected by Jach'a Jawira, a river which originates near the mountain Wila Lluxita and flows down to Lake Titicaca. Q'ara Quta is situated at a height of about 4,400 metres (14,400 ft), about 5 km long and 0,65 km at its widest point.

== See also ==
- Phaq'u Kiwuta
- Warawarani
- Wila Lluxi
