= Warawarani (Bolivia) =

Mountain in Bolivia

- Location within Bolivia

Highest point
- Elevation: 5,542 m (18,182 ft)
- Coordinates: 16°4′03″S 68°21′27″W

Geography
- Location: Bolivia, La Paz Department, Los Andes Province, Batallas Municipality
- Parent range: Andes, Cordillera Real

Climbing
- First ascent: 1975

Warawarani (Aymara warawara star, -ni a suffix to indicate ownership, "the one with a star", also spelled Wara Warani) is an about 5,542-metre-high (18,182 ft) mountain at a small lake of the same name in the Cordillera Real in the Andes of Bolivia. It is located in the La Paz Department, Los Andes Province, Batallas Municipality, Chachacomani Canton. It is situated north and northwest of Phaq'u Kiwuta and Wila Lluxi and northeast of Qala T'uxu.

== Warawarani lake ==
Warawarani Lake
- Interactive map of Warawarani Lake
- Location: Bolivia, La Paz Department, Los Andes Province, Batallas Municipality
- Coordinates: 16°4′34″S 68°22′4″W

Warawarani Lake lies southwest of the Warawarani mountain.

== See also ==
- Chachakumani
- Janq'u Uyu
- Kunturiri
- Q'ara Quta
