= Wila Lluxi =

Mountain in Bolivia

- Location within Bolivia

Highest point
- Elevation: 5,596 m (18,360 ft)
- Coordinates: 16°4′29″S 68°20′23″W

Geography
- Location: Bolivia, La Paz Department, Los Andes Province, Batallas Municipality
- Parent range: Andes, Cordillera Real

Climbing
- First ascent: 1-1970: E. ridge, descend N.W. ridge-1973: N. face & E. ridge-1975: S. face-1976.

Wila Lluxi (Aymara wila blood, blood-red, lluxi shell of a mussel; landslide, "red shell" or "red landslide", Hispanicized spellings Wila Lloje, Huilaroje) is a mountain in the Andes, about 5,596 m (18,360 ft) high. It lies in the Cordillera Real of Bolivia in the La Paz Department, Los Andes Province, Batallas Municipality, Kirani Canton. It is situated on the western side of the Janq'u Quta valley next to the mountains Warawarani and Phaq'u Kiwuta. Other prominent mountains nearby are Janq'u Laya and Janq'u Uyu in the north, and Wila Lluxita and Mullu Apachita in the northeast, all of them higher than 5,000 m.

== See also ==
- Kunturiri
- Q'ara Quta
- List of mountains in the Andes
