= Chachacomani =

Mountain in Bolivia

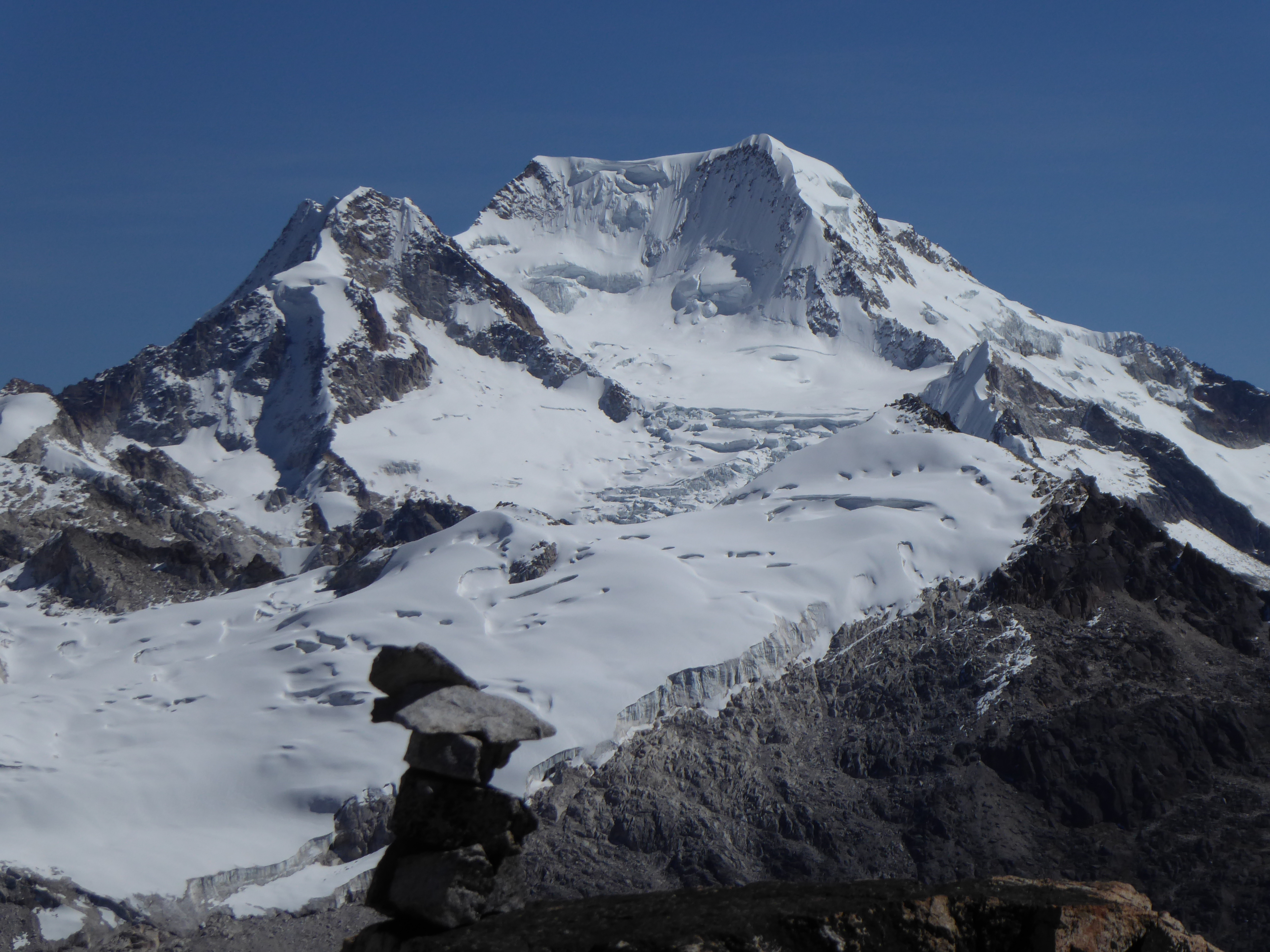
- Chachacomani seen from the peak of Wila Llojeta to the south

Highest point
- Elevation: 19,928 ft (6,074 m)
- Prominence: 2,004 ft (611 m)
- Parent peak: Chearoco
- Coordinates: 15°59′14″S 68°22′59″W

Geography
- Location within Bolivia
- Location: Bolivia
- Parent range: Cordillera Real

Climbing
- First ascent: 08/01/1947 - F. Fritz, F. Buchholtz (Germany) G. Moller, D. Doore, I. Paz, G. Sanjinez (Bolivia)
- Easiest route: Basic Snow/Ice Climb

Chachacomani (possibly from Quechua chachakuma a medical plant) is a mountain in the Cordillera Real of the Andes Mountains, east of Lake Titicaca in Bolivia.

It is situated in the La Paz Department, Larecaja Province, Guanay Municipality, southeast of Chearoco. Some of the nearest mountains are Wari Umaña in the southwest and Qillwani in the northwest.

Said to be one of the least climbed peaks in the Cordillera Real, the mountain has an elevation of 6,074 metres (19,928 ft) above sea level. The measured height has never been accurately measured, and may differ by up to 20 metres (66 ft), but the peak is ascertained to be over 6,000 metres (19,685 ft) in height. Notably, the deep and sheltered valleys around the mountain produce many distinct microclimates, which form lakes and other formations that support many species of birds.

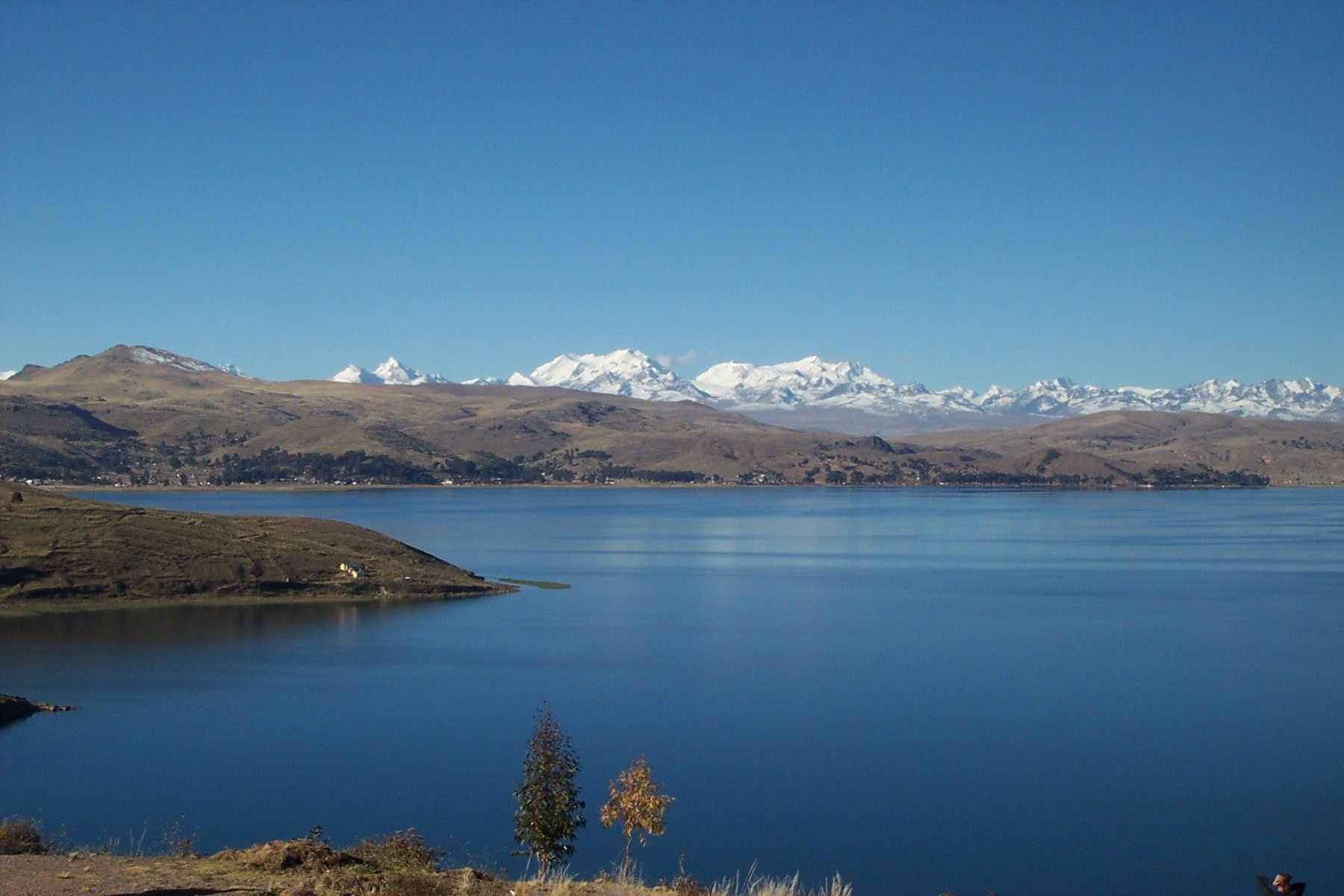
The Cordillera Real as seen from Lake Titicaca with Chearoco and Chachacomani in the center.

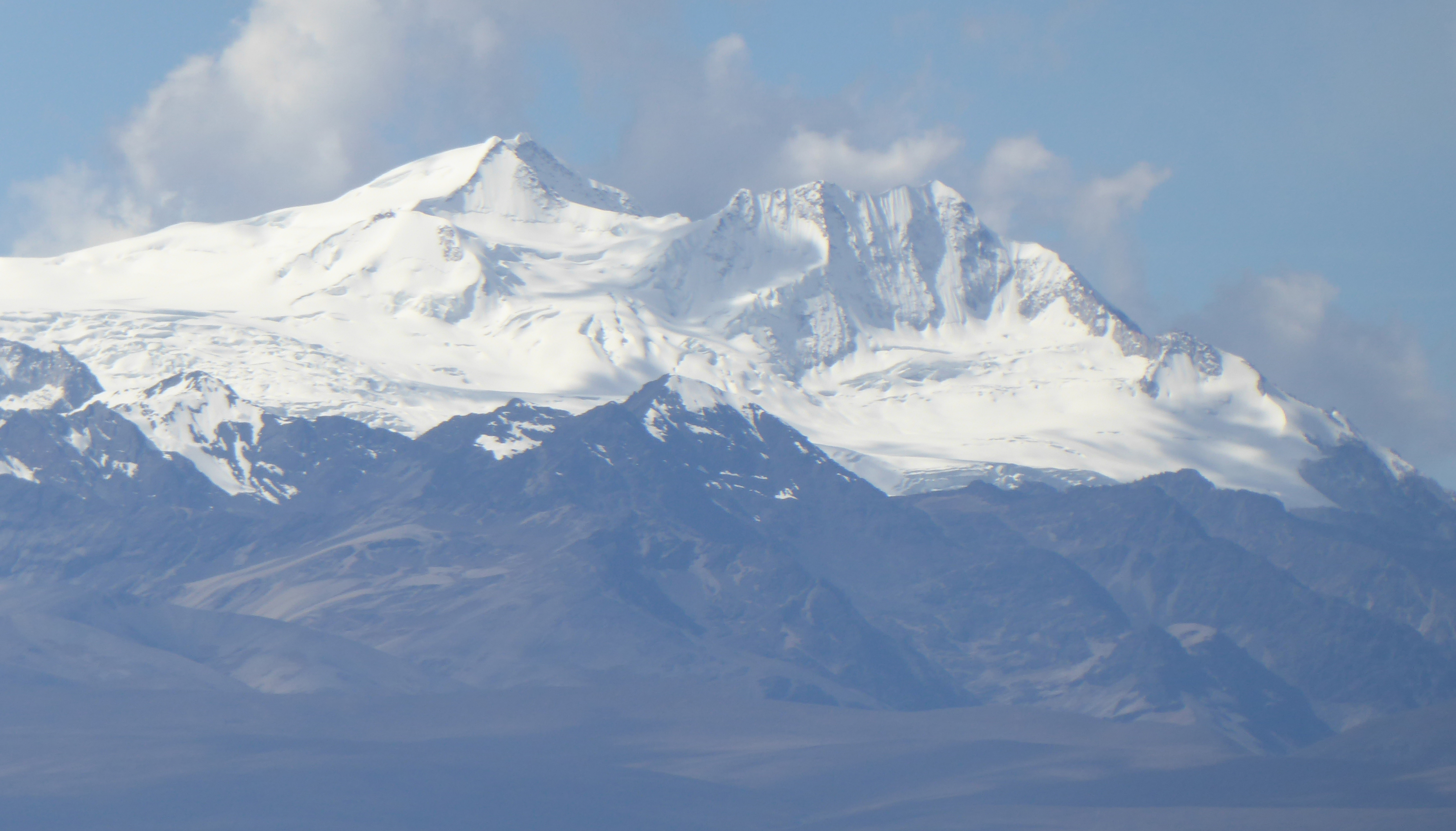
Chachacomani seen from Lake Titicaca.

== Elevation ==
It has an official height of 6074 meters. Other data from available digital elevation models: SRTM yields 6038 metres, ASTER 6043 metres and TanDEM-X 6084 metres. The height of the nearest key col is 5479 meters, leading to a topographic prominence of 595 meters. Chachacomani is considered a Mountain according to the Dominance System and its dominance is 9.8%. Its parent peak is Chearoko and the Topographic isolation is 4.3 kilometers.

== First Ascent ==
Chachacomani was first climbed by F. Fritz, F. Buchholtz (Germany) G. Moller, D. Doore, I. Paz and G. Sanjinez (Bolivia) 8 January 1947.

== See also ==
- Qalsata
- Q'asiri
