= Cordillera Real (Bolivia) =

Mountain in Bolivia

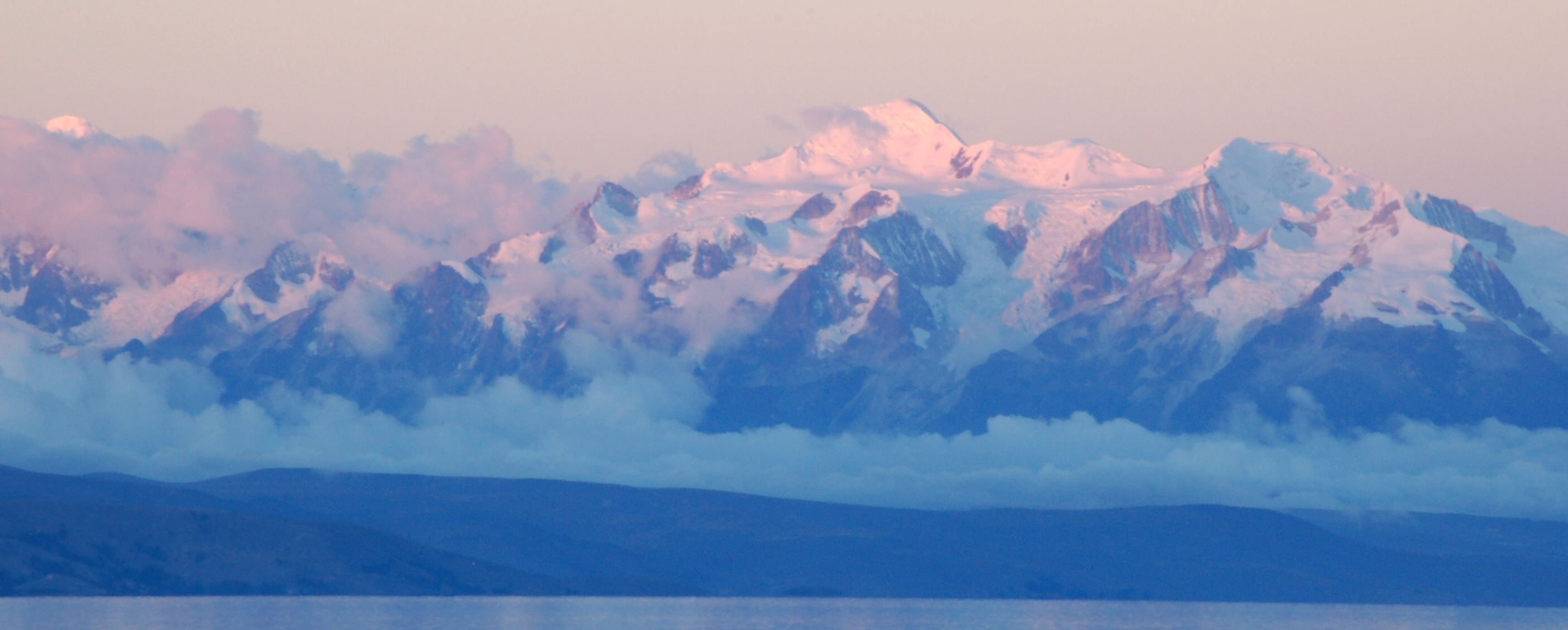
- Cordillera Real as seen from Lake Titicaca

Highest point
- Peak: Illimani
- Elevation: 21,122 ft (6,438 m)
- Coordinates: 16°39′14″S 67°47′05″W

Dimensions
- Length: 125 km (78 mi)
- Width: 20 km (12 mi)

Geography
- Country: Bolivia
- Region: Altiplano
- Range coordinates: 17°00′S 67°10′W
- Parent range: Andes

Geology
- Rock type: granite

The Cordillera Real is a mountain range in the South American Altiplano of Bolivia, forming part of the Andes. This range of fold mountains, largely composed of granite, is located southeast of Lake Titicaca, and east of the Bolivian capital of La Paz. The range stretches 125 km in length and 20 km in width. Even though it is only 17° south of the Equator, the Cordillera Real is relatively densely glaciated. This is due to its proximity to the Amazon lowlands with its associated moist air masses.

== Mountains ==
Cordillera Real looking north with Illimani (foreground), Wayna Potosí (upper left) and Mururata (on the right)

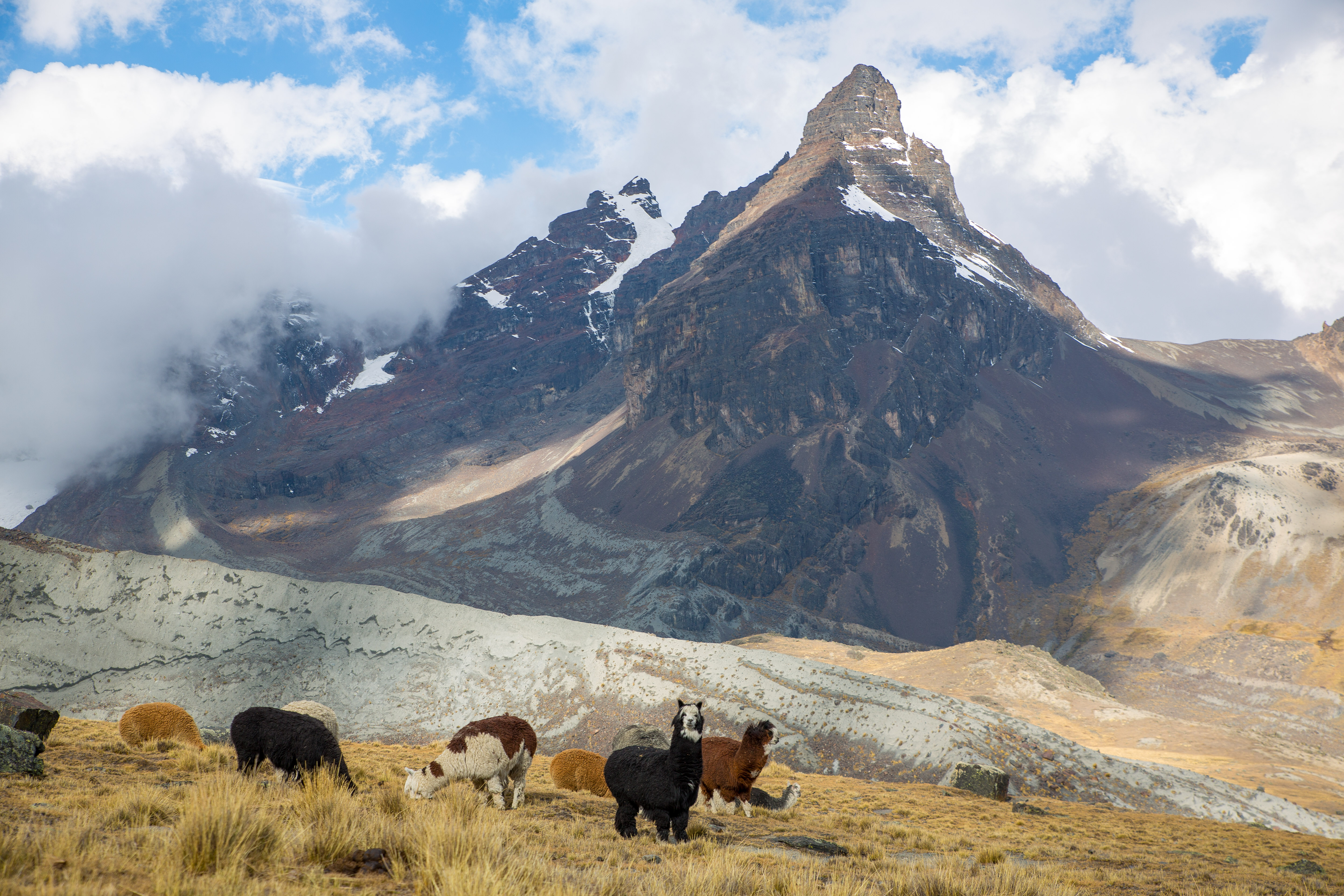
A group of llamas grazing in the Cordillera Real

The highest mountain in the range is Illimani at 6,438 metres (21,122 ft). Other notable peaks are:

- Janq'u Uma, 6,427 metres (21,086 ft)
- Illampu, 6,368 metres (20,892 ft)
- Layqa Qullu, 6,166 metres (20,230 ft)
- Ch'iyar Juqhu, 6,127 metres (20,102 ft)
- Wayna Potosí, 6,088 metres (19,974 ft)
- Chachakumani, 6,074 metres (19,928 ft)
- Pico del Norte, 6,070 metres (19,915 ft)
- Khunu Tawa, 5,981 metres (19,623 ft)
- Mamaniri, 5,970 metres (19,587 ft)
- Qullu Wich'inka, 5,970 metres (19,587 ft)
- Wayna Illampu, 5,950 metres (19,521 ft)
- Qutaña (Pico Schulze), 5,933 metres (19,465 ft)
- Janq'u Piti, 5,918 metres (19,416 ft)
- Qillwani, 5,828 metres (19,121 ft)
- Pirámide, 5,906 metres (19,377 ft)
- Kimsa Qullu, 5,893 metres (19,334 ft)
- Qalsata, 5,874 metres (19,272 ft)
- Mururata, 5,871 metres (19,262 ft)
- Laram Quta, 5,840 metres (19,160 ft)
- Q'asiri, 5,828 metres (19,121 ft)
- Uma Jalanta, 5,723 metres (18,776 ft)
- Kunturiri, 5,648 metres (18,530 ft)
- Wila Lluxi, 5,596 metres (18,360 ft)
- Phaq'u Kiwuta, 5,589 metres (18,337 ft)
- Chuyma Ch'iyara, 5,578 metres (18,301 ft)
- Sirk'i Qullu, 5,546 metres (18,196 ft)
- Janq'u Laya, 5,545 metres (18,192 ft)
- Warawarani, 5,542 metres (18,182 ft)
- Wiluyu Janq'u Uma, 5,540 metres (18,176 ft)
- Yapuchañani, 5,526 metres (18,130 ft)
- Llamp'u, 5,519 metres (18,107 ft)
- Janq'u Uyu, 5,512 metres (18,084 ft)
- Jisk'a Pata, 5,508 metres (18,071 ft)
- Milluni, 5,483 metres (17,989 ft)
- Imasiña, 5,458 metres (17,907 ft)
- Patapatani, 5,452 metres (17,887 ft)
- Chiqapa, 5,450 metres (17,881 ft)
- Silla Pata, 5,442 metres (17,854 ft)
- Wintanani, 5,428 metres (17,808 ft)
- Pulpituna, 5,426 metres (17,802 ft)
- Jach'a Pata, 5,424 metres (17,795 ft)
- Chacaltaya, 5,421 metres (17,785 ft)
- Jathi Qullu, 5,421 metres (17,785 ft)
- Nasa Q'ara, 5,416 metres (17,769 ft)
- Pura Purani T'uxu, 5,416 metres (17,769 ft)
- Ch'iyar Qullu, 5,398 metres (17,710 ft)
- Mullu Apachita, 5,368 metres (17,612 ft)
- Qulin Tuqu, 5,368 metres (17,612 ft)
- Ch'iyar Qirini, 5,363 metres (17,595 ft)
- Jach'a T'uxu, 5,358 metres (17,579 ft)
- Mik'aya, 5,342 metres (17,526 ft)
- Tilata, 5,336 metres (17,507 ft)
- Qala Uyu, 5,324 metres (17,467 ft)
- Wak'ani, 5,321 metres (17,457 ft)
- Pura Purani, 5,318 metres (17,448 ft)
- Wila Jisk'a Pata, 5,310 metres (17,421 ft)
- Qutapata, 5,300 metres (17,388 ft)
- Jach'a Qullu, 5,298 metres (17,382 ft)
- Qutapata, 5,288 metres (17,349 ft)
- Saltuni, 5,284 metres (17,336 ft)
- Wari Umaña, 5,264 metres (17,270 ft)
- Jist'aña, 5,260 metres (17,257 ft)
- Kuntur Jipiña, 5,260 metres (17,257 ft)
- Wila Wilani, 5,250 metres (17,224 ft)
- Wila Lluxita, 5,244 metres (17,205 ft)
- Wila Wila, 5,240 metres (17,192 ft)
- Q'asiri, 5,224 metres (17,139 ft)
- Churu, 5,200 metres (17,060 ft)
- Janq'u K'ark'a, 5,200 metres (17,060 ft)
- Waxra Apachita, 5,200 metres (17,060 ft)
- Jach'a Juqhu, 5,192 metres (17,034 ft)
- Imilla Apachita, 5,184 metres (17,008 ft)
- Aqhuya Aqhuyani, 5,164 metres (16,942 ft)
- Kunturiri, 5,160 metres (16,929 ft)
- Maman Quta, 5,160 metres (16,929 ft)
- Ch'iyar Qullu, 5,112 metres (16,772 ft)
- Mich'ini, 5,100 metres (16,732 ft)
- Wawanaki, 5,100 metres (16,732 ft)
- Ch'iyar T'ikhi, 5,092 metres (16,706 ft)
- Japu Japuni, 5,088 metres (16,693 ft)
- Qala T'uxu, 5,076 metres (16,654 ft)
- Nasa Q'ara, 5,064 metres (16,614 ft)
- Turini, 5,064 metres (16,614 ft)
- Wari Qalluni Pata, 5,064 metres (16,614 ft)
- P'iq'iñ Q'ara, 5,059 metres (16,598 ft)
- Kimsa Chata, 5,056 metres (16,588 ft)
- Lapuchu, 5,054 metres (16,581 ft)
- Pallqa K'ark'a, 5,046 metres (16,555 ft)
- Thipata, 5,045 metres (16,552 ft)
- Janq'u K'ark'a, 5,038 metres (16,529 ft)
- Wila Quta, 5,032 metres (16,509 ft)
- Larama Punta, 5,028 metres (16,496 ft)
- Wila Lluxita, 5,020 metres (16,470 ft)
- Quña Quñani, 5,006 metres (16,424 ft)
- Wila Kunka Pata, 5,002 metres (16,411 ft)
- Jisk'a Chukita, 4,980 metres (16,339 ft)
- Tira K'ark'a, 4,974 metres (16,319 ft)
- Milluni, 4,968 metres (16,299 ft)
- Q'ulini, 4,968 metres (16,299 ft)
- Q'ara Qullu, 4,956 metres (16,260 ft)
- Salla Jipiña, 4,944 metres (16,220 ft)
- Wanakuni, 4,944 metres (16,220 ft)
- Jach'a Pata, 4,940 metres (16,207 ft)
- Ñuñuni Qalani, 4,940 metres (16,207 ft)
- Wisk'achani, 4,940 metres (16,207 ft)
- Taypi K'uchu, 4,928 metres (16,168 ft)
- Parqu Quta, 4,910 metres (16,109 ft)
- Jisk'a Turini, 4,905 metres (16,093 ft)
- Parqu Quta, 4,900 metres (16,076 ft)
- Qawiña, 4,900 metres (16,076 ft)
- Q'iya Q'iyani, 4,898 metres (16,070 ft)
- Qullqi Chata, 4,876 metres (15,997 ft)
- Ch'iyar Qullu, 4,875 metres (15,994 ft)
- Jamp'aturi, 4,871 metres (15,981 ft)
- Ch'uñawi, 4,846 metres (15,899 ft)
- Uyu K'uchu, 4,800 metres (15,748 ft)
- Wallata Qalluni, 4,795 metres (15,732 ft)
- Qala Wathiyani, 4,794 metres (15,728 ft)
- Sura Qullu, 4,752 metres (15,591 ft)
- Wari Wachana, 4,745 metres (15,568 ft)
- Wich'u Apachita, 4,708 metres (15,446 ft)
- Q'iya Q'iyani, 4,704 metres (15,433 ft)
- Inka, c. 4,700 metres (15,420 ft)
- Sankayuni, 4,646 metres (15,243 ft)
- Chankuni, 4,638 metres (15,217 ft)
- Janq'u Qalani, 4,592 metres (15,066 ft)
- Ullumani, 4,428 metres (14,528 ft)
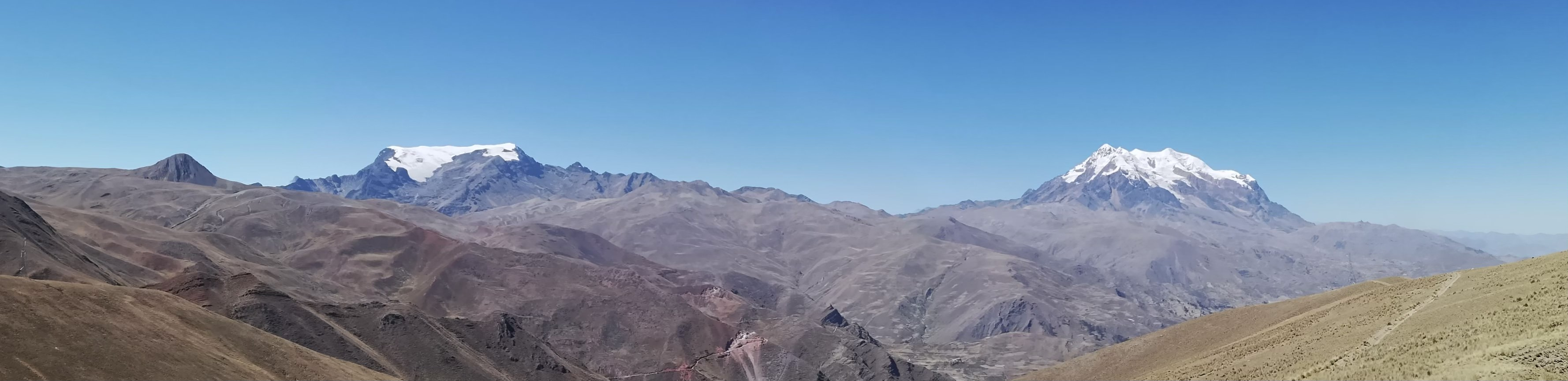
Mururata (left) and Illimani (right), two prominent peaks of the Cordillera Real.

== See also ==
- Ch'iyar Quta
- Cordillera Kimsa Cruz
