= Ch'iyar Qullu =

Ch'iyar Qullu (Aymara ch'iyara black, qullu mountain, "black mountain", also spelled Chiar Collu, Chiar Khollu, Chiar Kkollu, Chiarcollo) may refer to:

- Ch'iyar Qullu (Larecaja), a mountain in the Larecaja Province, La Paz Department, Bolivia
- Ch'iyar Qullu (Los Andes), a mountain in the Los Andes Province, La Paz Department, Bolivia
- Ch'iyar Qullu (Murillo), a mountain at the border of the La Paz Municipality and the Palca Municipality, Murillo Province, La Paz Department, Bolivia
- Ch'iyar Qullu (Oruro), a volcanic center in the Ladislao Cabrera Province, Oruro Department, Bolivia
- Ch'iyar Qullu (Palca), a mountain in the Palca Municipality, Murillo Province, La Paz Department, Bolivia
- Ch'iyar Qullu (Sud Yungas), a mountain in the Sud Yungas Province, La Paz Department, Bolivia

== See also ==
- Tata Ch'iyar Qullu or Ch'iyar Qullu, a mountain in the Palca Municipality, Murillo Province, La Paz Department, Bolivia
