= Silla Pata =

Mountain in Bolivia

- The Illimani massif as seen from the south with Silla Pata (lower center, left, snowless)

Highest point
- Elevation: 5,442 m (17,854 ft)
- Coordinates: 16°40′36″S 67°45′37″W

Geography
- Location within Bolivia
- Location: Bolivia, La Paz Department, Murillo Province
- Parent range: Andes, Cordillera Real

Silla Pata (Aymara silla cane of maize, pata step, "maize cane step") is a 5,442-metre-high (17,854 ft) mountain in the Cordillera Real in the Andes of Bolivia. It is located in the La Paz Department, Murillo Province, Palca Municipality. Silla Pata lies in the southern part of the Illimani massif. It is situated south-east of the highest point of the massif and Layqa Qullu and south-west of Link'u Link'u.
