= Jukumarini (Murillo) =

Mountain in Bolivia

- Location within Bolivia

Highest point
- Elevation: 4,272 m (14,016 ft)
- Coordinates: 16°42′40″S 67°39′13″W

Geography
- Location: Bolivia; La Paz Department
- Parent range: Andes

Jukumarini (Aymara jukumari bear, -ni a suffix to indicate ownership, "the one with a bear", Hispanicized spelling Jucumarini) is a 4,272-metre-high (14,016 ft) mountain in the Bolivian Andes. It is situated in the La Paz Department, Murillo Province, Palca Municipality, near the border with the Sud Yungas Province, Irupana Municipality. Jukumarini lies southeast of Illimani, northeast of the village of Jukumarini (Jucumarini). The peak northeast of it is named K'usill Willk'i.
