= Churu (Bolivia) =

Mountain in Bolivia

- Location within Bolivia

Highest point
- Elevation: 5,200 m (17,100 ft)
- Coordinates: 16°32′40″S 67°50′26″W

Geography
- Location: Bolivia; La Paz Department
- Parent range: Andes, Cordillera Real

Churu (Aymara for a small waru waru / a lump, Hispanicized spelling Choro) is a 5,200-metre-high (17,060 ft) mountain in the Cordillera Real in the Bolivian Andes. It is situated in the La Paz Department, Sud Yungas Province, Irupana Municipality, near the border with the Murillo Province, Palca Municipality. Churu lies south-west of the mountain Mururata, west of a small lake named Qillwa Quta ("gull lake", Khellhua Khota), east of the mountain Wila Quta and south-east of the mountain Qutapata.
