= Palo Blanco =

Palo Blanco may refer to:

- Palo Blanco, Catamarca, Argentina
- Palo Blanco, Guerrero, Mexico, within Chilpancingo de los Bravo (municipality)
- Palo Blanco, Texas, United States
- Palo Blanco Airstrip, Baja California Sur, Mexico
- USS Palo Blanco (YN-85), an American ship
- Celtis reticulata, a tree native to the southwestern United States and northern Mexico sometimes known as palo blanco
- Mariosousa willardiana, a tree native to Sonora, Mexico, also known as palo blanco
- Picconia excelsa, a tree native to Madeira and the Canary Islands also known as palo blanco

== See also ==
- Palos Blancos, Bolivia
- Palos Blancos Municipality, Bolivia
- Paso Blanco, Panama
