= Janq'u Qalani (La Paz) =

Mountain in Bolivia

- Location within Bolivia

Highest point
- Elevation: 4,592 m (15,066 ft)
- Coordinates: 16°34′57″S 67°53′4″W

Geography
- Location: Bolivia; La Paz Department
- Parent range: Andes, Cordillera Real

Janq'u Qalani (Aymara janq'u white, qala stone, -ni a suffix to indicate ownership, "the one with a white stone", also spelled Janco Khalani, Jankho Khalani) is a 4,592-metre-high (15,066 ft) mountain in the Cordillera Real in the Bolivian Andes. It lies in the La Paz Department, Murillo Province, Palca Municipality. Janq'u Qalani is situated southwest of Mururata, Qutapata, Churu and Wila Quta.
