= Jach'a Quta (Sud Yungas) =

Lake in the Sud Yungas Province, La Paz Department, Bolivia

- Location within Bolivia Location within South America
- Interactive map of Jach'a Quta
- Location: Bolivia, La Paz Department, Sud Yungas Province
- Coordinates: 16°29′14″S 67°51′22″W

Jach'a Quta (Aymara jach'a big, quta lake, "big lake", also spelled Jachcha Kkota) is a lake in Bolivia located in the La Paz Department, Sud Yungas Province, Yanacachi Municipality, north-west of the mountain Mururata. It lies south-east of the mountain Wanakuni and the lakes Warawarani and Jisk'a Warawarani at the mountain Thakis Uma. One of the smaller lakes near Jach'a Quta is named Jisk'a Quta ("small lake", Jiskha Kkota). It is situated north-east of Jach'a Quta.
