= Parqu Quta =

Mountain in Bolivia

- Illimani (foreground), Mururata (on the right) and Parqu Quta

Highest point
- Elevation: 4,900 m (16,100 ft)
- Coordinates: 16°29′39″S 67°52′45″W

Geography
- Location within Bolivia
- Location: Bolivia, La Paz Department
- Parent range: Andes, Cordillera Real

Parqu Quta (Aymara parqu twisted, quta lake, "twisted lake", also spelled Parco Kkota) is a mountain in the Cordillera Real in the Andes of Bolivia which reaches a height of approxilamtely 4,900 m (16,100 ft). It is located in the La Paz Department, Murillo Province, Palca Municipality. Parqu Quta lies at a small lake, west of Mururata.
