= Wisk'achani (Sud Yungas) =

Mountain in Bolivia

- Location within Bolivia

Highest point
- Elevation: 4,088 m (13,412 ft)
- Coordinates: 16°38′27″S 67°42′39″W

Geography
- Location: Bolivia, La Paz Department, Sud Yungas Province
- Parent range: Andes

Wisk'achani (Aymara wisk'acha a rodent, -ni a suffix to indicate ownership, "the one with the viscacha (or viscachas)", Hispanicized spelling Viscachani) is a 4,088-metre-high (13,412 ft) mountain in the eastern extensions of the Cordillera Real in the Andes of Bolivia. It is situated in the La Paz Department, Sud Yungas Province, Irupana Municipality. Wisk'achani lies west of the Illimani massif, northeast of Link'u Link'u.

The Illimani massif with Link'u Link'u (center). Wisk'achani (on the right) is hidden by the clouds.
