= Ch'uxña Quta (Murillo) =

Lake in La Paz Department, Bolivia

- Location within Bolivia Location within South America
- Interactive map of Ch'uxña Quta
- Location: Bolivia, La Paz Department, Murillo Province
- Coordinates: 16°29′10″S 67°55′45″W

Ch'uxña Quta (Aymara ch'uxña green, quta lake, "green lake", also spelled Chojña Kkota) is a lake in the La Paz Department in Bolivia. It is situated in the Murillo Province, Palca Municipality. Ch'uxña Quta lies northeast of the mountain Tata Ch'iyar Qullu.

The river Jach'a Sura (Jachcha Sura) which originates near the mountain Ch'iyar Qullu flows through the lake. Its direction is to the southwest along the village of Chuqi Quta ("gold lake", Choquecota, Choquekhota) where it changes its name to Chuqi Quta (Choquekkota). The river is an affluent of Wila Pampa which later is called Pallqa (Palca). Its waters flow to the La Paz River.
