= P'iq'iñ Q'ara (La Paz) =

Mountain in Bolivia

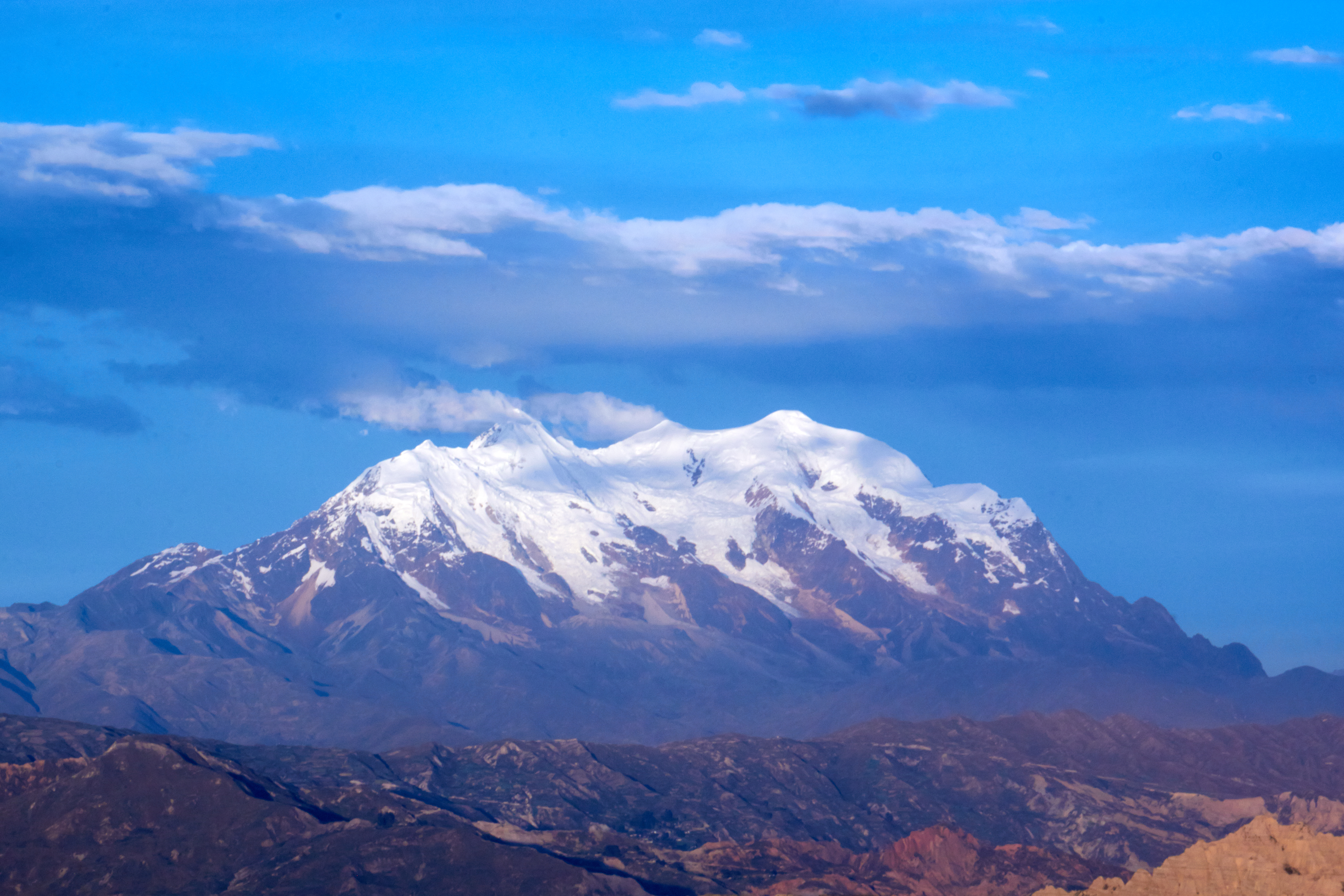
- Illimani with P'iq'iñ Q'ara in front of it (on the left) as seen from the north-west

Highest point
- Elevation: 5,059 m (16,598 ft)
- Coordinates: 16°36′42″S 67°49′26″W

Geography
- Location within Bolivia
- Location: Bolivia, La Paz Department, Murillo Province
- Parent range: Andes, Cordillera Real

P'iq'iñ Q'ara (Aymara p'iq'iña head, q'ara bare, bald, p'iq'iña q'ara bald, "baldheaded", also spelled Phekhen Khara) is a 5,059-metre-high (16,598 ft) mountain in the Cordillera Real in the Andes of Bolivia. It is situated in the La Paz Department, Murillo Province, Palca Municipality. P'iq'iñ Q'ara lies southwest of the mountain Pupusani, west to northwest of Ch'iyar Qullu and northwest of Illimani.
