= Astrothelium chulumanense =

Scientific classification
- Kingdom: Fungi
- Division: Ascomycota
- Class: Dothideomycetes
- Order: Trypetheliales
- Family: Trypetheliaceae
- Genus: Astrothelium
- Species: A. chulumanense

Binomial name
- Astrothelium chulumanense Flakus, Kukwa & Aptroot (2023)

Species of lichen

Astrothelium chulumanense is a little-known species of corticolous (bark-dwelling), crustose lichen in the family Trypetheliaceae. Found in the Yungas montane forest of Bolivia, it was formally described as a new species in 2023. It is characterized by pseudostromata not differing in colour from the thallus, perithecia immersed for the most part in the thallus with the upper part elevated above and covered with orange pigment, apical and fused ostioles, the absence of lichexanthone, a clear hamathecium, eight-spored asci, and large, muriform ascospores with a thickened median septum.

== Taxonomy ==
Astrothelium chulumanense for described as new to science in 2023 by lichenologists Adam Flakus, Martin Kukwa, and André Aptroot. The holotype was collected in the Sud Yungas Province of La Paz Department, Bolivia, near the Estación Biológica Santiago de Chirca, close to the town of Chulumani; the elevation was 2,271 m (7,451 ft). The species is named after its type locality.

== Description ==
The thallus of Astrothelium chulumanense is corticate, with an uneven and somewhat shiny surface. Pseudostromata are raised above the thallus and are hemispherical to wart-shaped. The ascomata are in the form of perithecia; they are pyriform to hemispherical, and aggregated. The asci are 8-spored, and the ascospores are distoseptate, hyaline, and densely muriform, with a gelatinous layer in younger stages and a distinct thickened median septum.

The thallus surface and pseudostromata surface both exhibit an orange-yellow UV reaction. A trace of an unidentified substance was detected in the thallus by thin-layer chromatography. Results of standard chemical spot test are: K−, C−, KC−, in the thallus; UV+ (orange-yellow) in the surface of the thallus and the pseudostromata, and K+ (red) for the visible part of the perithecia.

=== Similar species ===
Astrothelium chulumanense is phylogenetically related and externally similar to A. robustum. Both species have ascomata with fused ostioles, but ascospores in A. robustum usually have between 5 and 7 septa (although sometimes as few as 3 or as many as 9). A. chulumanense can be distinguished from other similar Astrothelium species by its unique combination of characters, including pseudostromata not differing in colour from the thallus, the orange-yellow UV reaction, the absence of lichexanthone, perithecia immersed for the most part in the thallus, apical and fused ostioles, clear hamathecium, 8-spored asci, and large, muriform ascospores with median septa.

== Habitat and distribution ==
Astrothelium chulumanense is currently known only from its type locality in the Yungas montane forest in Bolivia.
