= Laram Quta (Sud Yungas) =

Lake in the Sud Yungas Province, La Paz Department, Bolivia

- Location within Bolivia Location within South America
- Interactive map of Laram Quta
- Location: Bolivia, La Paz Department, Sud Yungas Province
- Coordinates: 16°33′20″S 67°49′10″W

Laram Quta (Aymara larama blue, quta lake, "blue lake", also spelled Laram Kkota) is a lake in the Cordillera Real in the Andes of Bolivia. It is located in the La Paz Department, Sud Yungas Province, Irupana Municipality. It lies south of the mountain Mururata. Laram Quta is situated south-west of the lakes Artisa Pata (Arteza Pata) and Artisa Quta (Arteza Kkota). The lakes north-west of it are named Qillwa Quta ("gull lake", Kellhua Kkota) and Ch'iyar Quta ("black lake", Chiar Kkota) which is the small one next to Laram Quta.
