= Achachi Qala (Murillo) =

Mountain in Bolivia

- Location within Bolivia

Highest point
- Elevation: 4,505 m (14,780 ft)
- Coordinates: 16°31′24″S 67°59′16″W

Geography
- Location: Bolivia; La Paz Department
- Parent range: Andes

Achachi Qala (Aymara for "gigantic stone", Hispanicized spelling Achachicala) is a 4,505-metre-high (14,780 ft) mountain in the Bolivian Andes. It is located in the La Paz Department, Murillo Province, Palca Municipality. Achachi Qala lies southwest of Ch'iyar Qullu.
