= Cutusuma =

- Village
- Location within Bolivia
- Coordinates: 16°27′S 67°30′W
- Country: Bolivia
- Department: La Paz Department
- Province: Sud Yungas Province
- Municipality: Chulumani Municipality
- Canton: Villa Asunta Canton

Population (2001)
  - Total: 331
- Time zone: UTC-4 (BOT)

Cutusuma is a location in the La Paz Department in Bolivia. It is the seat of the Villa Asunta Canton, one of the five cantons of the Chulumani Municipality in the Sud Yungas Province. At the time of census 2001 it had 331 inhabitants.
