= Inka (La Paz) =

Mountain in Bolivia

- Location within Bolivia

Highest point
- Coordinates: 16°28′56″S 67°49′49″W

Geography
- Location: Bolivia; La Paz Department
- Parent range: Andes, Cordillera Real

Inka (Aymara and Quechua for Inca, Hispanicized spelling Inca) is a mountain in the Cordillera Real in the Bolivian Andes. It is situated in the La Paz Department, Sud Yungas Province, Yanacachi Municipality. Inka lies north-east of the mountain Mururata and south-east of the mountain Wanakuni.
