= Calacoto =

Coordinates: 17°17′S 68°38′W

- Barrio
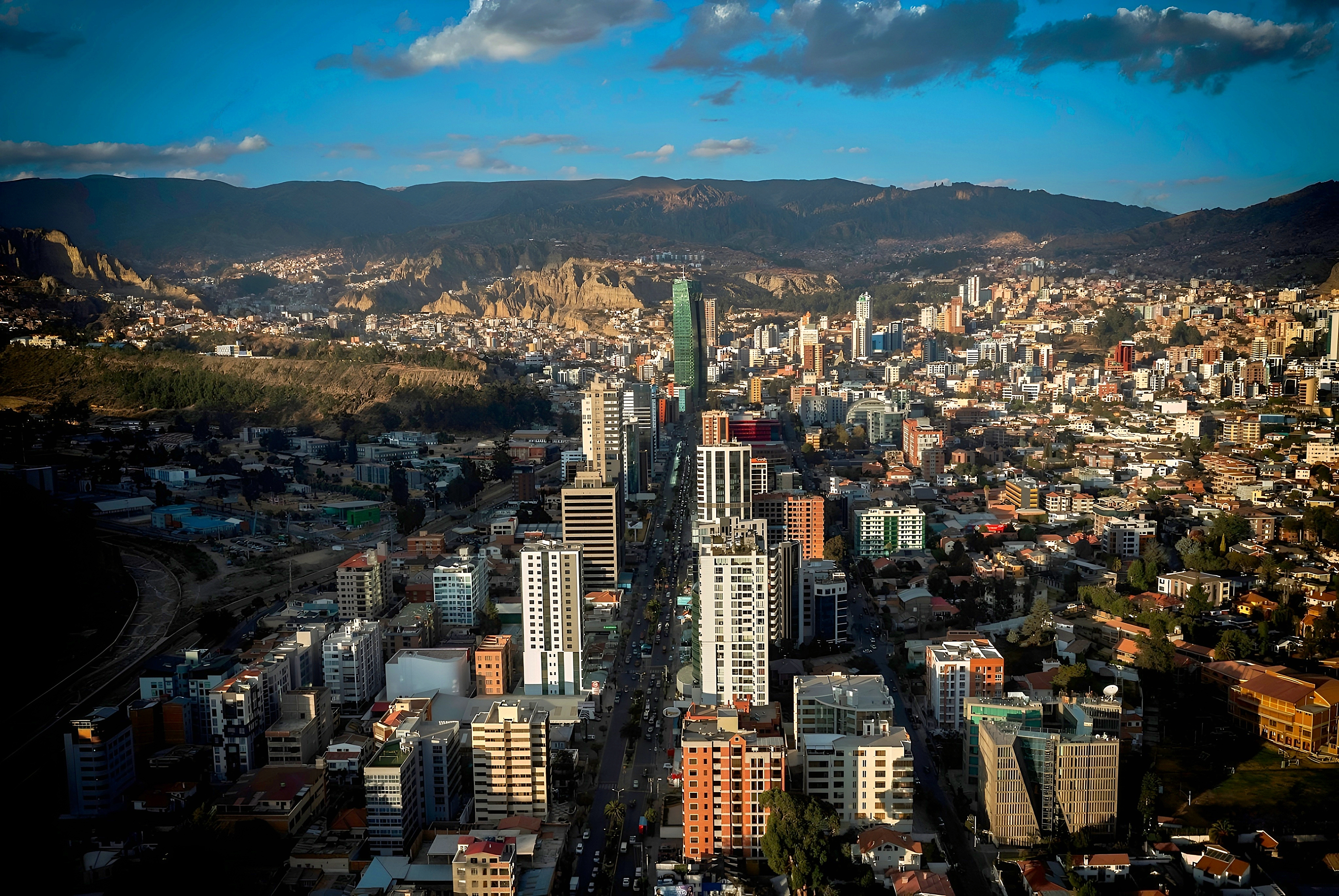
- Aerial view of Calacoto
- Interactive map of Calacoto
- Country: Bolivia
- Municipality: La Paz
- Time zone: UTC-4 (BOT)

Calacoto (hispanicized spelling) or Qalaqutu (Aymara qala stone, qutu pile, heap, "stone pile") is a neighborhood in La Paz Municipality, Bolivia. It is located in the southern part of the city and is considered one of the largest residential zones due to the cost of the houses and the services available. The population in this neighborhood has a medium to high income level. The zone is located about 15 kilometers from downtown. Calacoto is located in the central zone of the Zona Sur which is considered the biggest residential area in the country along with Santa Cruz De La Sierra’s Equipetrol and Cochabamba’s Cala Cala.

The demographics of Calacoto are Catholic white and mestizo (Spanish and other European with Aymara and Quechua descent) with middle to high socioeconomic status from all ages.

== Climate ==
Climate data for Palca (Note: Palca is located approximately 13 kilometres (8.1 mi) south-east of Calacoto.), elevation 3,333 m (10,935 ft), (1981–2010)
Month	Jan	Feb	Mar	Apr	May	Jun	Jul	Aug	Sep	Oct	Nov	Dec	Year
Mean daily maximum °C (°F)	19.1 (66.4)	19.6 (67.3)	19.9 (67.8)	20.1 (68.2)	20.3 (68.5)	19.9 (67.8)	19.2 (66.6)	19.6 (67.3)	19.4 (66.9)	20.4 (68.7)	21.0 (69.8)	20.5 (68.9)	19.9 (67.9)
Mean daily minimum °C (°F)	8.8 (47.8)	8.5 (47.3)	8.3 (46.9)	6.5 (43.7)	3.0 (37.4)	1.5 (34.7)	0.9 (33.6)	2.0 (35.6)	4.4 (39.9)	6.3 (43.3)	7.7 (45.9)	9.0 (48.2)	5.6 (42.0)
Average precipitation mm (inches)	119 (4.7)	88 (3.5)	50 (2.0)	17 (0.7)	5 (0.2)	4 (0.2)	11 (0.4)	11 (0.4)	21 (0.8)	31 (1.2)	35 (1.4)	67 (2.6)	459 (18.1)
Source: National Meteorology and Hydrology Service of Peru
