= Layqa Qullu =

Mountain in Bolivia

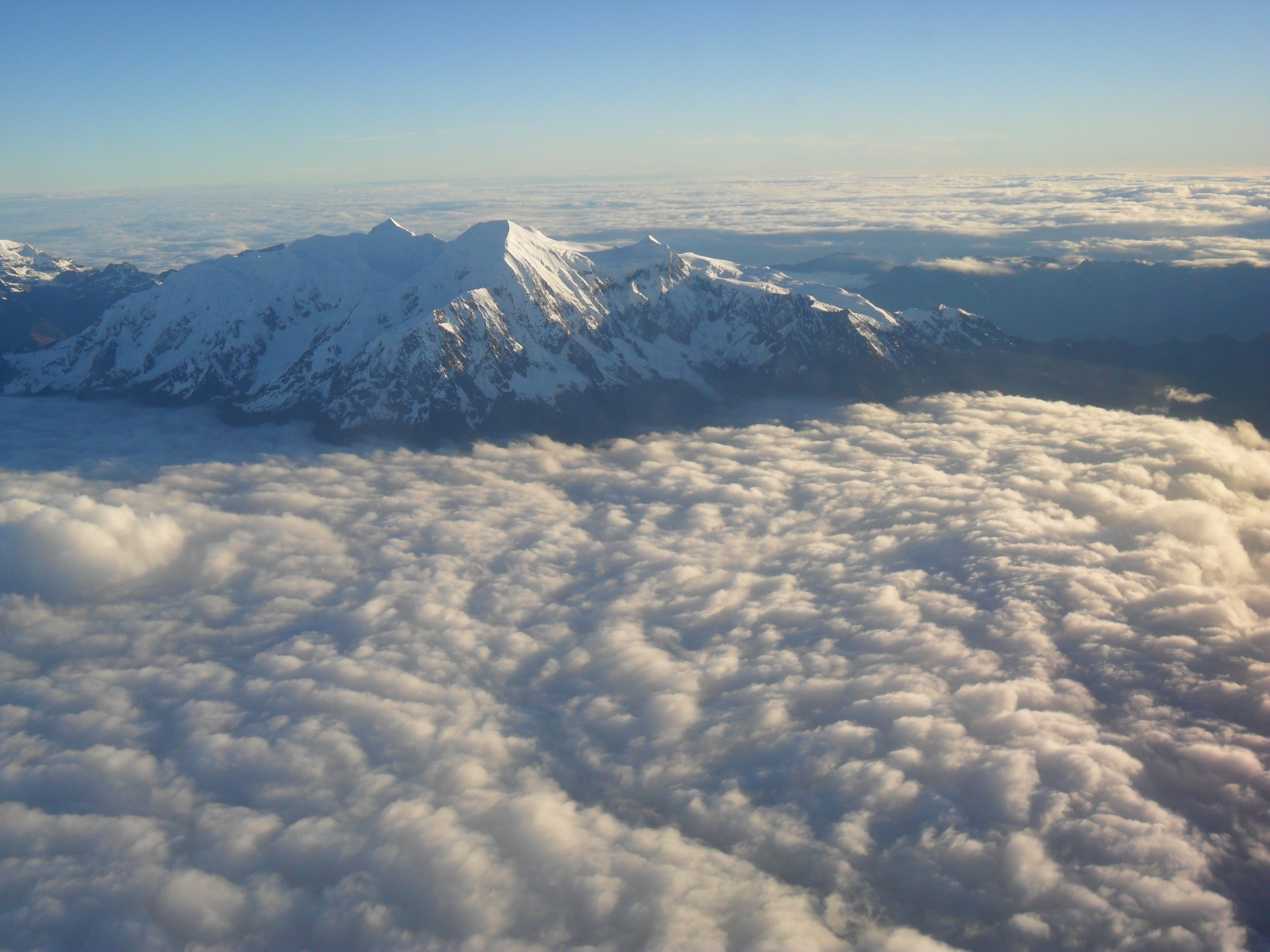
- Illimani massif as seen from the west

Highest point
- Elevation: 6,166 m (20,230 ft)
- Coordinates: 16°39′12″S 67°46′00″W

Geography
- Location within Bolivia
- Location: Bolivia, La Paz Department, Murillo Province, Sud Yungas Province
- Parent range: Andes, Cordillera Real

Layqa Qullu (Aymara layqa wizard, sorcerer, witch, sorceress, witch doctor, medicine man, qullu mountain, "wizard mountain", also spelled Laica Kkollu) is a 6,166-metre-high (20,230 ft) peak in the Cordillera Real in the Andes of Bolivia. It is one of the highest peaks in the Illimani massif. It is situated in the La Paz Department, Murillo Province, Palca Municipality, and in the Sud Yungas Province, Irupana Municipality. Layqa Qullu lies south-east of the highest point of the massif, north-west of Link'u Link'u and Silla Pata.
