= Qaqinkura =

Mountain in Bolivia

- Location within Bolivia

Highest point
- Elevation: 3,200 m (10,500 ft)
- Coordinates: 16°31′11″S 67°38′18″W

Geography
- Location: Bolivia, La Paz Department, Sud Yungas Province
- Parent range: Andes

Qaqinkura (Aymara for wading bird; a South American ibis (Theristicus) also spelled Caquingora) is a mountain in the eastern extensions of the Cordillera Real in the Andes of Bolivia, about 3,200 m (10,499 ft) high. It is situated in the La Paz Department, Sud Yungas Province, Irupana Municipality, east of Mururata.
