= Kunturiri (Palca) =

Mountain in Bolivia

- Location within Bolivia

Highest point
- Elevation: 4,170 m (13,680 ft)
- Coordinates: 16°37′04″S 67°54′18″W

Geography
- Location: Bolivia; La Paz Department
- Parent range: Andes

Kunturiri (Aymara kunturi condor, -(i)ri a suffix, Hispanicized spelling Condoriri) is a 4,170-metre-high (13,681 ft) mountain in the Bolivian Andes. It lies in the La Paz Department, Murillo Province, Palca Municipality, west of the Cordillera Real. Kunturiri is situated south-west of the mountain Janq'u Qalani between the villages of Laqayani (Lacayani) in the south-west and Tarujiri in the north-east.
