= Q'asiri (Murillo) =

Mountain in Bolivia

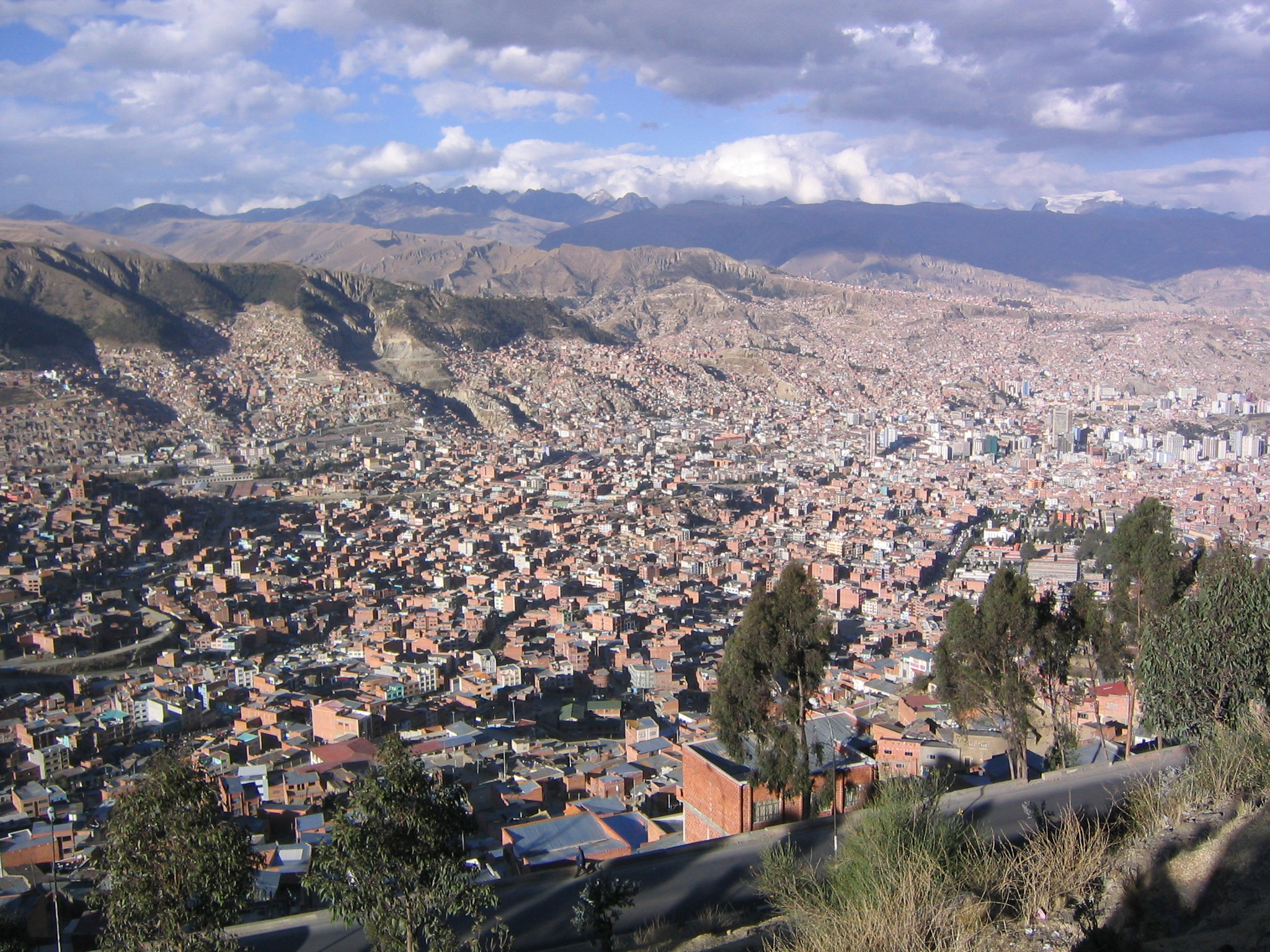
- A view of La Paz with the Cordillera Real in the background. Q'asiri lies in the sector shown in the upper left part of this image. Mururata is visible on the right.

Highest point
- Elevation: 5,224 m (17,139 ft)
- Coordinates: 16°26′40″S 67°56′15″W

Geography
- Location within Bolivia
- Location: Bolivia; La Paz Department
- Parent range: Andes, Cordillera Real

Q'asiri (Aymara for bawler, also spelled Khasiri) is a 5,224-metre-high (17,139 ft) mountain in the Cordillera Real in the Bolivian Andes. It lies in the La Paz Department, Murillo Province, at the border of the La Paz Municipality and the Palca Municipality. Q'asiri is situated south of the mountains Sirk'i Qullu and Jathi Qullu, north-west of the mountain Sura Qullu and north-east of the mountain Ch'iyar Qullu. Q'asiri lies between the lakes Q'asiri Quta ("Q'asiri lake", Khasiri Kkota) in the north-east and Jach'a Q'asiri Quta ("big Q'asiri lake", Laguna Jachcha Khasiri) in the south-west.
