= Irupana Municipality =

Irupana
- Municipality
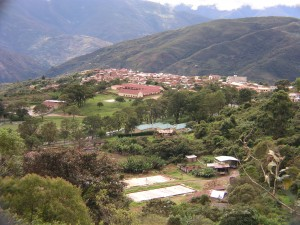
- Irupana

- Location within Bolivia
- Coordinates: 16°30′S 67°30′W
- Country: Bolivia
- Department: La Paz Department
- Province: Sud Yungas Province
- Seat: Irupana

Government
  - Mayor: Clemente Mamani Condorena (2007)
- Elevation: 5,900 ft (1,800 m)

Population (2001)
  - Total: 11,383
- Time zone: UTC-4 (BOT)

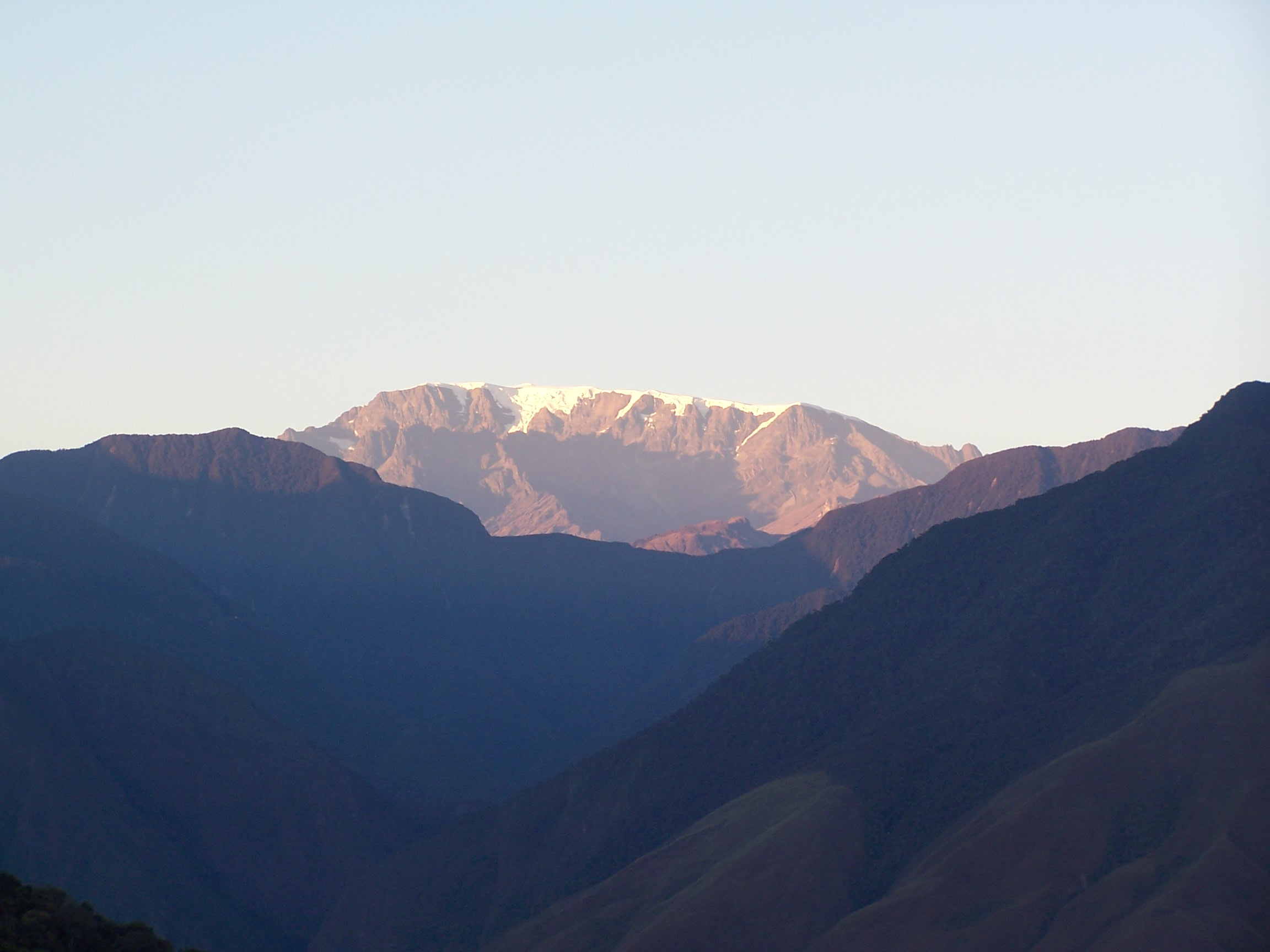
Mururata as seen from Coroico

Irupana Municipality or Villa de Lanza Municipality is the second municipal section of the Sud Yungas Province in the La Paz Department, Bolivia. Its seat is Irupana.

== Geography ==
The Cordillera Real traverses the municipality. The highest peaks of the municipality is Illimani at 6,438 m (21,122 ft) above sea level. Other mountains are listed below:

- Allpaqani
- Churu
- Ch'iyar Qullu
- Ch'uxña Pata
- K'illimani
- K'uchu Munti
- K'usill Willk'i
- Layqa Qullu
- Llaytuwani
- Link'u Link'u
- Mururata
- Pararani
- Pupusani
- Qaqinkura
- Qutapata
- Thiya Quta
- Waychuni
- Wisk'achani

== Subdivision ==
Irupana Municipality is divided into six cantons.

Canton	Inhabitants (2001)	Seat	Inhabitants (2001)
Irupana	4,465	Irupana	1,882
Lambate	2,693	Lambate	347
Laza	800	Laza	164
Taca	1,080	Taca	183
Chicaloma	1,177	Chicaloma	634
Victorio Lanza	1,168	Victorio Lanza	181

== See also ==
- Laram Quta
