= Pirqa Pata =

Mountain in Bolivia

- Location within Bolivia

Highest point
- Elevation: 4,060 m (13,320 ft)
- Coordinates: 16°24′38″S 67°49′39″W

Geography
- Location: Bolivia; La Paz Department
- Parent range: Andes

Pirqa Pata (Aymara pirqa wall, pata step, also spelled Percapata) is a mountain in the Bolivian Andes which reaches a height of approxilamtely 4,060 m (13,320 ft). It is situated in the La Paz Department, Sud Yungas Province, Yanacachi Municipality. Pirqa Pata lies east of the main range of the Cordillera Real, north of Mururata and southeast of Sirk'i Qullu and Pirqata.
