= Pirqata =

Mountain in Bolivia

- Location within Bolivia

Highest point
- Coordinates: 16°23′30″S 67°53′58″W

Geography
- Location: Bolivia; La Paz Department
- Parent range: Andes, Cordillera Real

Pirqata (Aymara pirqa wall, -ta a suffix, also spelled Perkhata) is a mountain in the Cordillera Real in the Bolivian Andes. It is situated in the La Paz Department, Sud Yungas Province, Yanacachi Municipality. Pirqata lies north-east of the mountains Jathi Qullu and Sura Qullu and east of Sirk'i Qullu.
