= Ocobaya =

- Town
- Location within Bolivia
- Coordinates: 16°26′S 67°30′W
- Country: Bolivia
- Department: La Paz Department
- Province: Sud Yungas Province
- Municipality: Chulumani Municipality
- Canton: Ocobaya Canton
- Elevation: 5,302 ft (1,616 m)

Population (2001)
  - Total: 269
- Time zone: UTC-4 (BOT)

Ocobaya is a location in the La Paz Department in Bolivia. It is the seat of the Ocobaya Canton, one of the five cantons of the Chulumani Municipality in the Sud Yungas Province. At the time of census 2001 it had 269 inhabitants.
