= Turini (Sud Yungas) =

Mountain in Bolivia

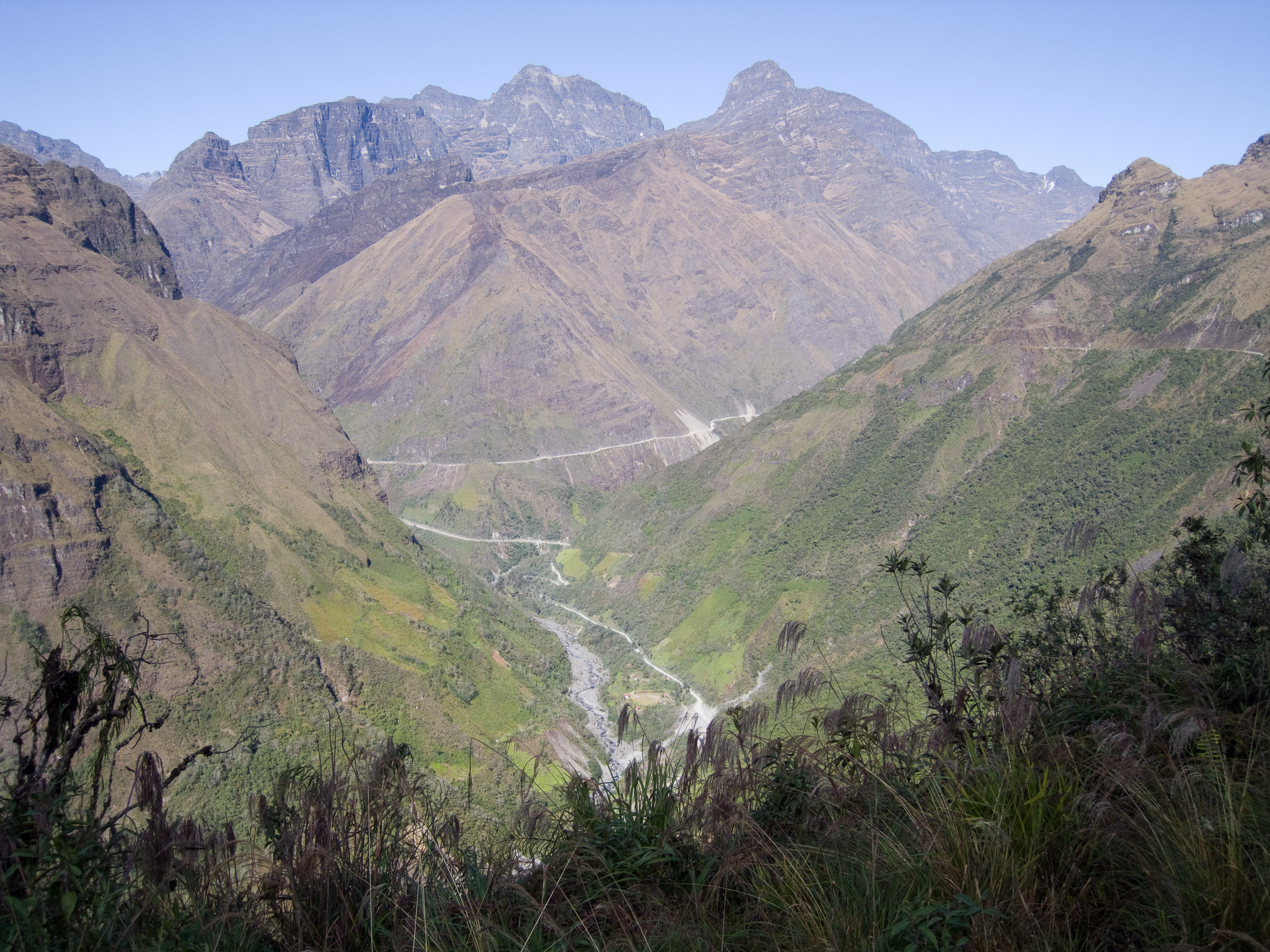
- Northeast face of Turini (in the background, on the left)

Highest point
- Elevation: 3,800 m (12,500 ft)
- Coordinates: 16°19′36″S 67°54′01″W

Geography
- Location within Bolivia
- Location: Bolivia; La Paz Department
- Parent range: Andes

Turini (Aymara turi tower, -ni a suffix, "the one with a tower") is a mountain in the Bolivian Andes which reaches a height of approxilamtely 3,800 m (12,500 ft). It is situated in the La Paz Department, Sud Yungas Province, Yanacachi Municipality, south of Unduavi.
