= La Asunta Municipality =

- Municipality
- Flag

- Location within Bolivia
- Coordinates: 16°0′S 67°0′W
- Country: Bolivia
- Department: La Paz Department
- Province: Sud Yungas Province
- Seat: La Asunta
- Time zone: UTC-4 (BOT)

La Asunta Municipality is the fifth municipal section of the Sud Yungas Province in the La Paz Department, Bolivia. Its seat is La Asunta.
