= Sura Surani =

Mountain in Bolivia

- Location within Bolivia

Highest point
- Elevation: 4,840 m (15,880 ft)
- Coordinates: 16°21′24″S 67°55′06″W

Geography
- Location: Bolivia; La Paz Department
- Parent range: Andes

Sura Surani (Aymara sura dry jiquima, a species of Pachyrhizus, the reduplication indicates that there is a group of something, -ni a suffix, "the one with a lot of dry jiquima", also spelled Sora Sorani) is a mountain in the Bolivian Andes which reaches a height of approximately 4,840 m (15,880 ft). It is situated in the La Paz Department, Sud Yungas Province, Yanacachi Municipality. Sura Surani lies northeast of Mik'aya.
