= Wanakuni (Sud Yungas) =

Mountain in Bolivia

- Location within Bolivia

Highest point
- Elevation: 4,944 m (16,220 ft)
- Coordinates: 16°27′47″S 67°52′20″W

Geography
- Location: Bolivia; La Paz Department
- Parent range: Andes, Cordillera Real

Wanakuni (Aymara wanaku, wanaqu, -ni a suffix to indicate ownership, "the one with the guanaco", Hispanicized spelling Huanacuni) is a 4,944-metre-high (16,220 ft) mountain in the Cordillera Real in the Bolivian Andes. It is situated in the La Paz Department, Sud Yungas Province, Yanacachi Municipality, northeast of the city of La Paz. Wanakuni lies at a lake named Warawarani, southeast of Sura Qullu.
