= List of mountains in Bolivia =

List of mountains in Bolivia contains all discreet mountain peaks located in the South American country of Bolivia.

- Nevado Sajama (6,542 m or 21,463 ft), highest mountain in Bolivia
- Illimani (6,438 m or 21,122 ft)
- Janq'u Uma (6,427 m or 21,086 ft)
- Illampu (6,368 m or 20,892 ft)
- Parinacota (6,348 m or 20,827 ft)
- Huayna Potosi (6,088 m or 19,974 ft)
- Chachacomani (6,074 m or 19,928 ft)
