= Cohoni =

Coordinates: 16°42′S 67°50′W

- Town
- Interactive map of Cohoni
- Country: Bolivia
- Department: La Paz Department
- Province: Pedro Domingo Murillo Province
- Municipality: Palca Municipality

Population (2001)
  - Total: 1,051
- Time zone: UTC-4 (BOT)

A Cemetery in Cohoni

Cohoni is a small town in the Palca Municipality of Bolivia. In 2009 it had an estimated population of 1299.
