= La Asunta =

- Town
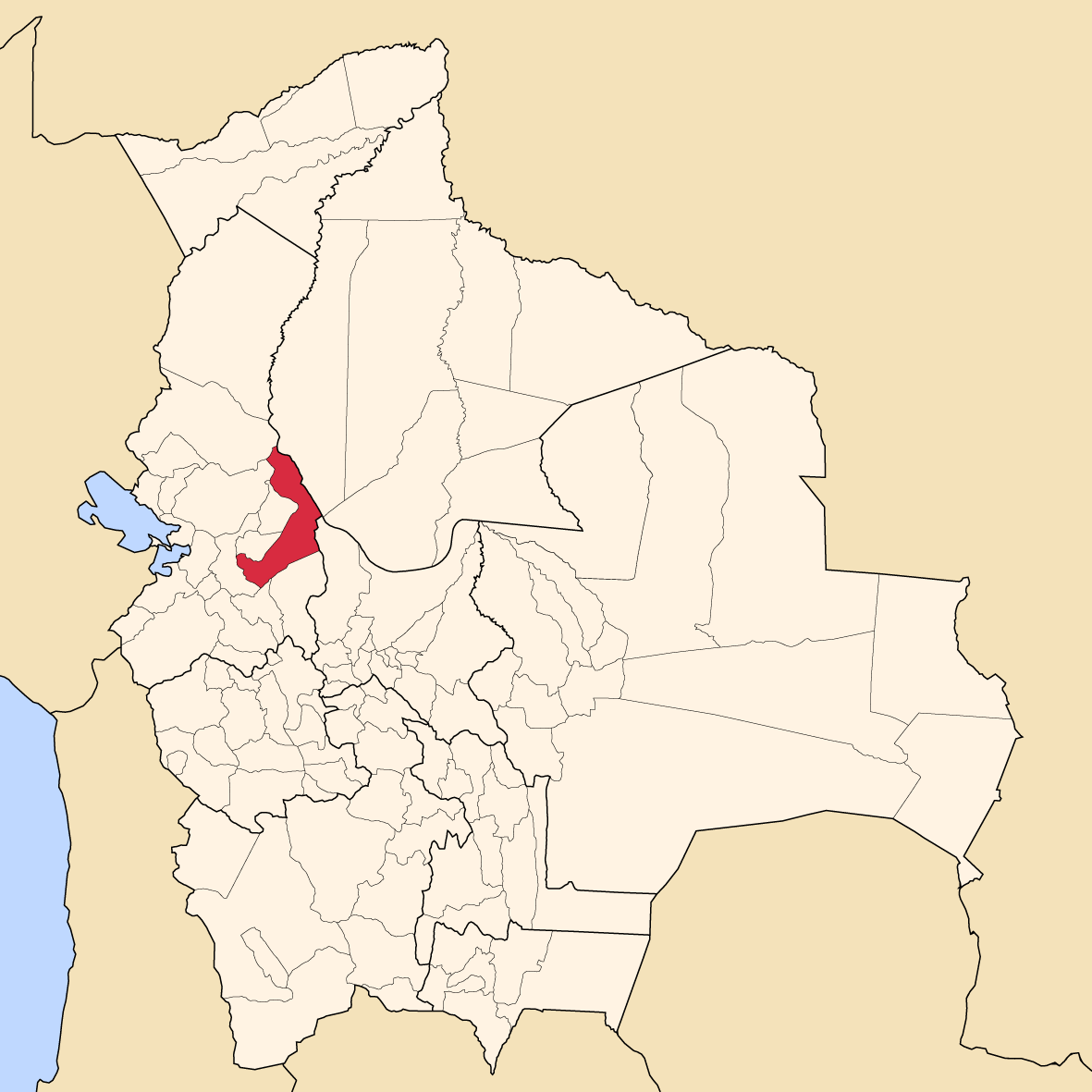
- Location of La Paz within Bolivia

- Location within Bolivia
- Coordinates: 16°08′S 67°12′W
- Country: Bolivia
- Department: La Paz Department
- Province: Sud Yungas Province
- Municipality: La Asunta Municipality

Population (2001)
  - Total: 1,466
- Time zone: UTC-4 (BOT)

La Asunta is a location in the La Paz Department in Bolivia. It is the seat of the La Asunta Municipality, the fifth municipal section of the Sud Yungas Province.
