= Yanacachi Municipality =

Yanacachi Yana K'achi
- Municipality
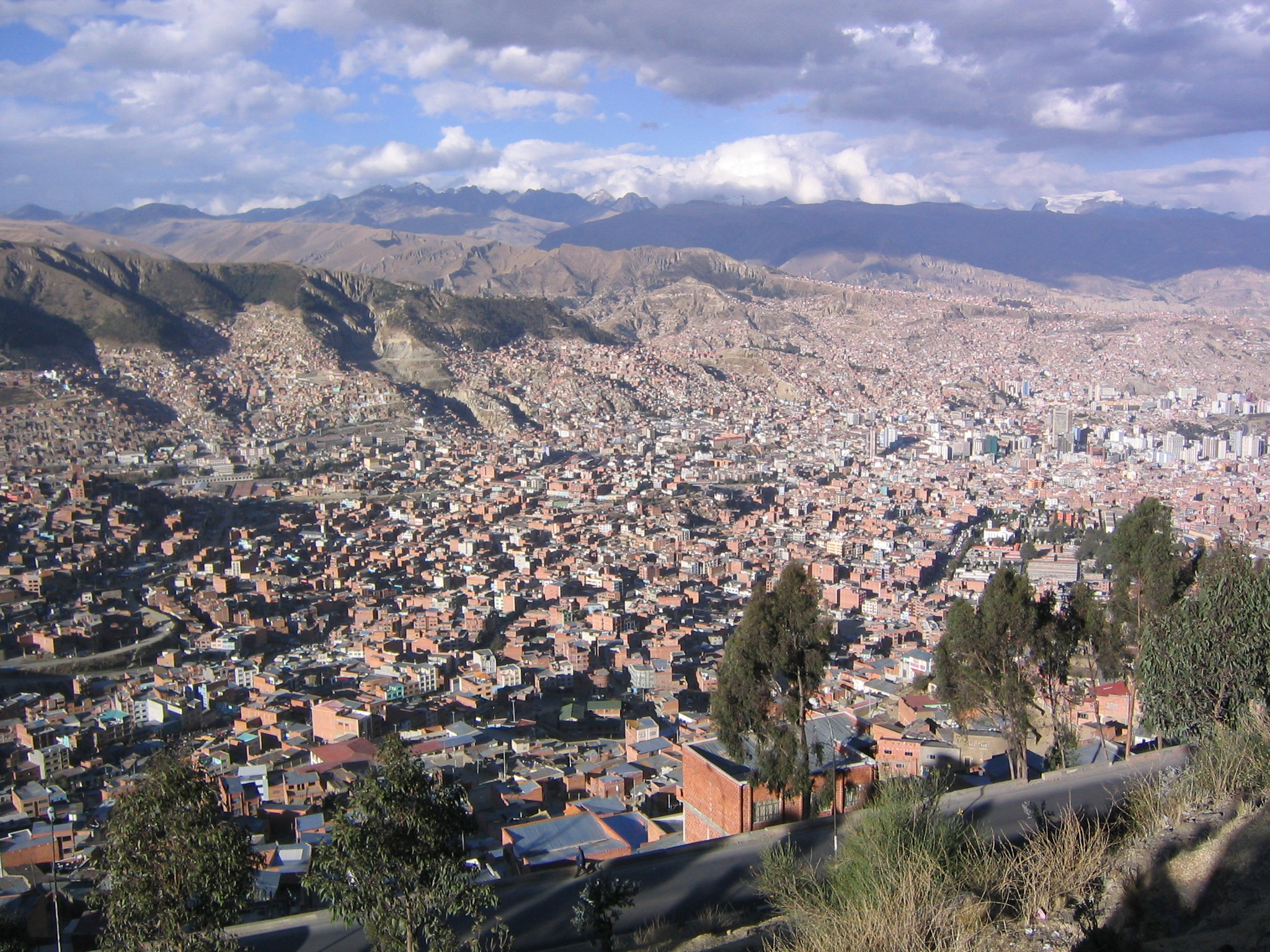
- A view of La Paz with the Cordillera Real in the background. Jathi Qullu of the Yanacachi Municipality lies in the sector shown in the upper left part of this image.

- Location within Bolivia
- Coordinates: 16°27′S 67°47′W
- Country: Bolivia
- Department: La Paz Department
- Province: Sud Yungas Province
- Seat: Yanacachi
- Time zone: UTC-4 (BOT)

Yanacachi Municipality is the third municipal section of the Sud Yungas Province in the La Paz Department, Bolivia. Its seat is Yanacachi.

== Geography ==
The Cordillera Real traverses the municipality. Some of the highest mountains of the municipality are listed below:

- Inka
- Jathi Qullu
- Mik'aya
- Pirqa Pata
- Pirqata
- Qalsata
- Qillwani
- Sura Qullu
- Sura Surani
- Turini
- Wak'ani
- Wanakuni
- Wayra Pata

== See also ==
- Jach'a Quta
