= Florian Hill =

Mountain in Germany

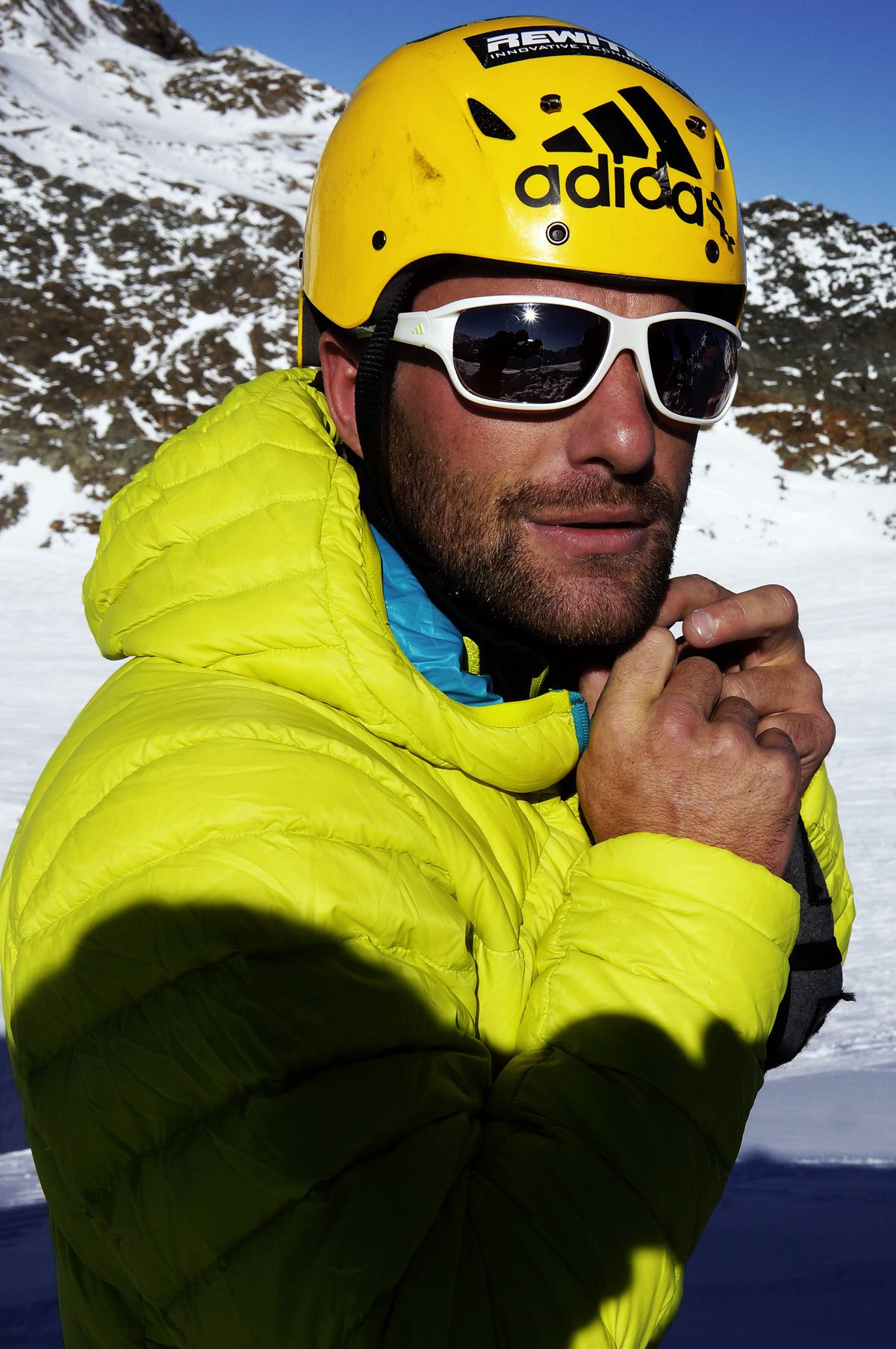

Florian Hill is a mountaineer and entrepreneur.

== Professional career ==
In 2012, Hill founded a consulting firm in New York City specializing in transatlantic economic relations. He is a fellow of Jonathan Edwards College at Yale University.

== Notable climbs ==
- First ascent Deliver Me, Illimani Southface (6.439 m), difficulty: VI, WI6, M6+, E5, alpine style; 1700 m.
- First ascent Chamaka, Sirk'i Qullu Southwest face (5.546 m) difficulty: VII, WI5, M5, alpine style; 550 m.
