= Irupana =

- Town
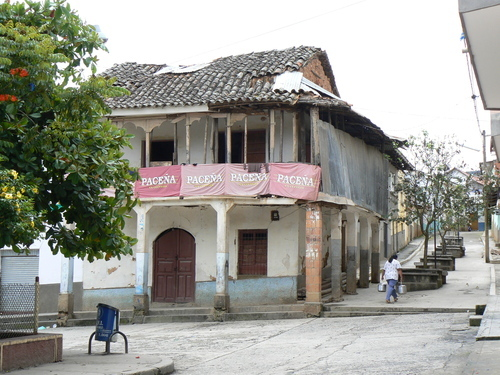
- Main square in Irupana

- Location within Bolivia
- Coordinates: 16°28′S 67°27′W
- Country: Bolivia
- Department: La Paz Department
- Province: Sud Yungas Province
- Municipality: Irupana Municipality

Population (2001)
  - Total: 1,882
- Time zone: UTC-4 (BOT)

Irupana is a location in the La Paz Department in Bolivia. It is the seat of the Irupana Municipality, the second municipal section of the Sud Yungas Province.

== Climate ==
Climate data for Irupana, elevation 1,946 m (6,385 ft)
Month	Jan	Feb	Mar	Apr	May	Jun	Jul	Aug	Sep	Oct	Nov	Dec	Year
Record high °C (°F)	33.0 (91.4)	31.0 (87.8)	30.5 (86.9)	30.0 (86.0)	31.5 (88.7)	30.0 (86.0)	28.7 (83.7)	31.0 (87.8)	32.0 (89.6)	33.8 (92.8)	33.0 (91.4)	32.0 (89.6)	33.8 (92.8)
Mean daily maximum °C (°F)	24.9 (76.8)	24.8 (76.6)	25.1 (77.2)	25.0 (77.0)	24.3 (75.7)	23.7 (74.7)	23.6 (74.5)	24.3 (75.7)	24.8 (76.6)	25.5 (77.9)	26.0 (78.8)	25.2 (77.4)	24.8 (76.6)
Daily mean °C (°F)	19.6 (67.3)	19.5 (67.1)	19.5 (67.1)	19.4 (66.9)	18.2 (64.8)	17.2 (63.0)	17.0 (62.6)	17.7 (63.9)	18.6 (65.5)	19.5 (67.1)	19.9 (67.8)	19.6 (67.3)	18.8 (65.9)
Mean daily minimum °C (°F)	14.3 (57.7)	14.1 (57.4)	14.0 (57.2)	13.7 (56.7)	12.2 (54.0)	10.8 (51.4)	10.4 (50.7)	11.3 (52.3)	12.3 (54.1)	13.4 (56.1)	13.8 (56.8)	14.1 (57.4)	12.9 (55.2)
Record low °C (°F)	5.5 (41.9)	6.2 (43.2)	8.5 (47.3)	7.0 (44.6)	1.5 (34.7)	1.5 (34.7)	5.0 (41.0)	3.9 (39.0)	6.0 (42.8)	5.3 (41.5)	5.2 (41.4)	5.0 (41.0)	1.5 (34.7)
Average precipitation mm (inches)	190.2 (7.49)	183.0 (7.20)	137.6 (5.42)	73.6 (2.90)	42.8 (1.69)	39.5 (1.56)	37.2 (1.46)	64.4 (2.54)	95.8 (3.77)	107.9 (4.25)	109.4 (4.31)	171.3 (6.74)	1,252.7 (49.33)
Average precipitation days	15.2	14.4	12.8	8.6	5.2	4.1	4.0	6.4	8.3	10.2	9.4	13.8	112.4
Average relative humidity (%)	82.8	84.5	83.9	83.0	82.8	83.7	81.7	82.2	82.2	82.1	81.9	81.3	82.7
Source: Servicio Nacional de Meteorología e Hidrología de Bolivia
