= Allpaqani =

Mountain in Bolivia

- Location within Bolivia

Highest point
- Elevation: 3,700 m (12,100 ft)
- Coordinates: 16°35′39″S 67°36′23″W

Geography
- Location: Bolivia, La Paz Department, Sud Yungas Province
- Parent range: Andes

Allpaqani (Aymara allpaqa a kind of llama, -ni a suffix to indicate ownership, "the one with the alpaca (or alpacas)", hispanicized spelling Alpacani) is a mountain in the eastern extensions of the Cordillera Real in the Andes of Bolivia, about 3,700 m (12,139 ft) high. It is situated in the La Paz Department, Sud Yungas Province, Irupana Municipality.
