= Yanacachi =

Yanacachi Yana K'achi
- Town
- Location within Bolivia
- Coordinates: 16°24′S 67°44′W
- Country: Bolivia
- Department: La Paz Department
- Province: Sud Yungas Province
- Municipality: Yanacachi Municipality

Population (2001)
  - Total: 504
- Time zone: UTC-4 (BOT)

View of Yanacachi in the mountainous Sud Yungas region of La Paz Department, Bolivia.

Yanacachi is a location in the La Paz Department in Bolivia. It is the seat of the Yanacachi Municipality, the third municipal section of the Sud Yungas Province.
