= Wila Quta (La Paz) =

Mountain in the Cordillera Real in the Bolivian Andes

- Location within Bolivia

Highest point
- Elevation: 5,032 m (16,509 ft)
- Coordinates: 16°32′45″S 67°51′46″W

Geography
- Location: Bolivia; La Paz Department
- Parent range: Andes, Cordillera Real

Wila Quta (Aymara wila blood red, blood, quta, lake, "red lake", also spelled Wila Khota, Wila Kkota) is a 5,032-metre-high (16,509 ft) mountain in the Cordillera Real in the Bolivian Andes. It is situated in the La Paz Department, Murillo Province, Palca Municipality. It lies southwest of Mururata and Qutapata and northeast of Janq'u Qalani.
