= K'usill Willk'i =

Mountain in Bolivia

- Location within Bolivia

Highest point
- Elevation: 4,200 m (13,800 ft)
- Coordinates: 16°42′12″S 67°38′51″W

Geography
- Location: Bolivia; La Paz Department
- Parent range: Andes

K'usill Willk'i (Aymara k'usillu monkey, willk'i gap, "monkey gap", also spelled Khusill Willkhi, Khuzill Willkhi) is a mountain in the Bolivian Andes which reaches a height of approximately 4,200 m (13,800 ft). It is located in the La Paz Department, Sud Yungas Province, Irupana Municipality. K'usill Willk'i lies northeast of Jukumarini.
