= Chulumani Municipality =

- Municipality
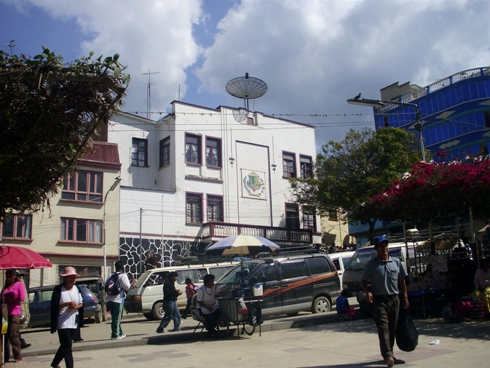
- Chulumani

- Location within Bolivia
- Coordinates: 16°22′S 67°32′W
- Country: Bolivia
- Department: La Paz Department
- Province: Sud Yungas Province
- Seat: Chulumani

Government
  - Mayor: Damaso Torrez Cuba (2007)
  - President: Francisco Quispe Cusi (2007)
- Elevation: 5,900 ft (1,800 m)

Population (2001)
  - Total: 13,204
- Time zone: UTC-4 (BOT)

Chulumani Municipality or Villa de la Libertad Municipality is the first municipal section of the Sud Yungas Province in the La Paz Department, Bolivia. Its seat is Chulumani.

== Cantons ==
Chulumani Municipality is divided into five cantons.

Canton	Inhabitants (2001)	Seat
Chulumani Canton	6,158	Chulumani
Chirca Canton	939	Chirca
Huancané Canton	3,892	Huancané
Ocobaya Canton	1,286	Ocobaya
Villa Asunta Canton	729	Cutusuma
