= Qutapata =

Mountain in Bolivia

- Location within Bolivia

Highest point
- Elevation: 5,300 m (17,400 ft)
- Coordinates: 16°32′7″S 67°50′45″W

Geography
- Location: Bolivia; La Paz Department
- Parent range: Andes, Cordillera Real

Qutapata (Aymara quta lake, pata step, also spelled Kkotapata, Kotapata) is a 5,300-metre-high (17,388 ft) mountain in the Cordillera Real in the Bolivian Andes. It is situated in the La Paz Department, Sud Yungas Province, Irupana Municipality, near the border with the Murillo Province, Palca Municipality. Qutapata lies south-west of the mountain Mururata and north-east of the mountain Wila Quta.
