= Qalsata (Sud Yungas) =

Mountain in Bolivia

- Location within Bolivia

Highest point
- Elevation: 4,860 m (15,940 ft)
- Coordinates: 16°21′03″S 67°51′51″W

Geography
- Location: Bolivia, La Paz Department, Sud Yungas Province
- Parent range: Andes

Qalsata (Aymara: qalsa, stones, + -ta, a suffix; Hispanicized spelling Calsada) is a mountain in the Andes of Bolivia, about 4,860 metres (15,945 ft) high. It is located in the La Paz Department, Sud Yungas Province, Yanacachi Municipality. Qalsata lies east of the Pirqa Pampa River (Perkha Pampa) which flows to the Unduavi River in the north.
