= K'illimani =

Mountain in Bolivia

- Location within Bolivia

Highest point
- Elevation: 3,456 m (11,339 ft)
- Coordinates: 16°41′19″S 67°36′48″W

Geography
- Location: Bolivia; La Paz Department
- Parent range: Andes

K'illimani (Aymara k'illima coal, -ni a suffix, "the one with coal", also spelled Killimani) is a 3,456-metre-high (11,339 ft) mountain in the Bolivian Andes. It is located in the La Paz Department, Sud Yungas Province, Irupana Municipality.
