= Palos Blancos Municipality =

- Municipality
- Flag

- Location within Bolivia
- Coordinates: 15°31′S 67°15′W
- Country: Bolivia
- Department: La Paz Department
- Province: Sud Yungas Province
- Seat: Palos Blancos
- Time zone: UTC-4 (BOT)

Palos Blancos Municipality is the fourth municipal section of the Sud Yungas Province in the La Paz Department, Bolivia. Its seat is Palos Blancos.
