= Palca, Bolivia =

- Town
- Location within Bolivia
- Coordinates: 16°34′00″S 67°57′00″W
- Country: Bolivia
- Department: La Paz Department
- Province: Pedro Domingo Murillo Province
- Municipality: Palca Municipality
- Elevation: 3,465 m (11,368 ft)

Population (2013)
  - Total: 1,180
- Time zone: UTC-4 (BOT)
- Climate: Cwb

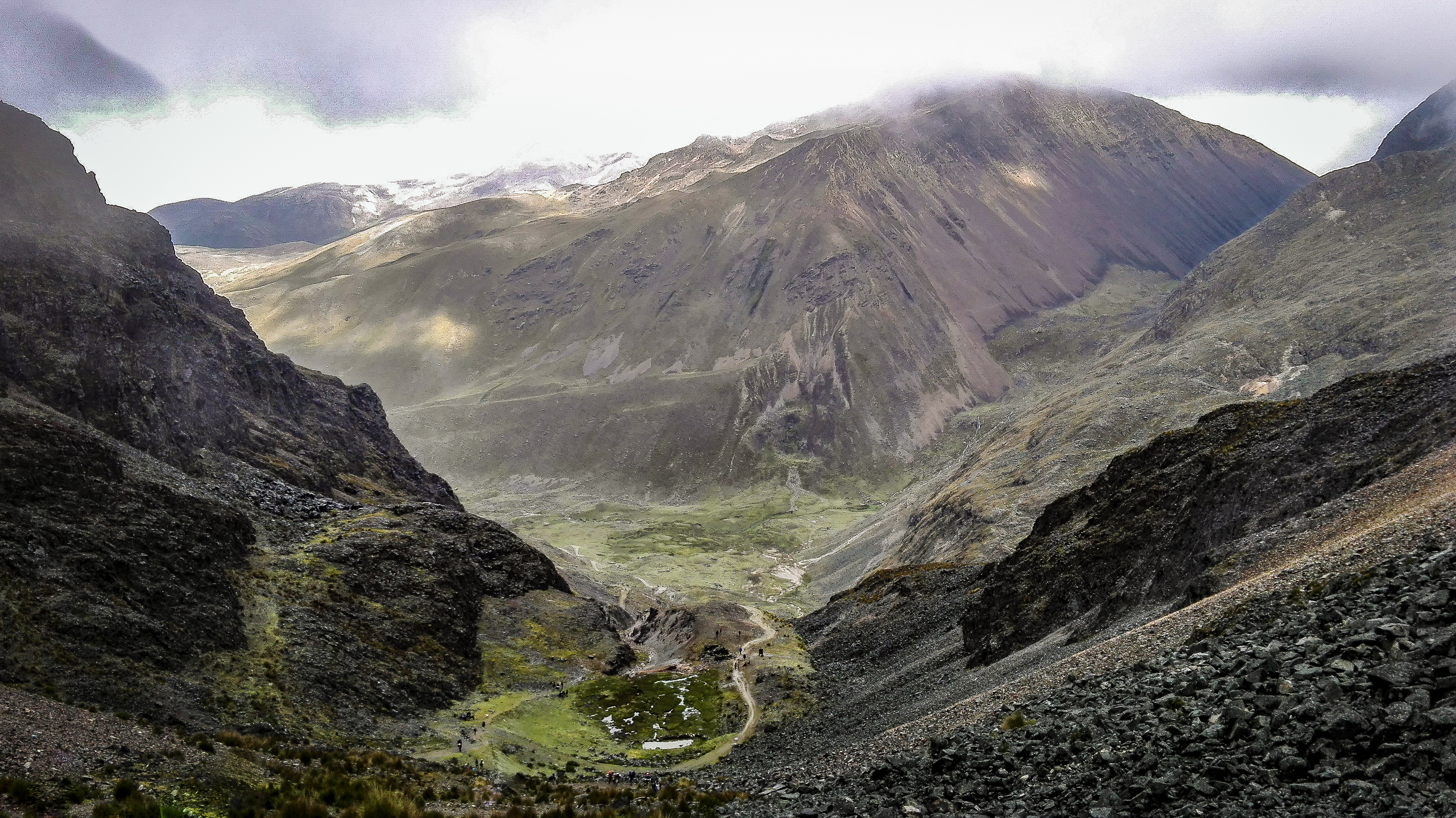
National Park and Natural Area of Integrated Management Cotapata

Palca, Bolivia is a location in the La Paz Department in Bolivia. It is the seat of the Palca Municipality, the first municipal section of the Pedro Domingo Murillo Province.

== Geography ==
Palca lies on the edge of the Quimsa Cruz mountain range, part of the Bolivian Cordillera Real. The region's climate is typically diurnal, with daily temperature fluctuations more pronounced than the average seasonal temperature differences.

== Climate ==
Climate data for Palca, elevation 3,333 m (10,935 ft), (1981–2010)
Month	Jan	Feb	Mar	Apr	May	Jun	Jul	Aug	Sep	Oct	Nov	Dec	Year
Mean daily maximum °C (°F)	19.1 (66.4)	19.6 (67.3)	19.9 (67.8)	20.1 (68.2)	20.3 (68.5)	19.9 (67.8)	19.2 (66.6)	19.6 (67.3)	19.4 (66.9)	20.4 (68.7)	21.0 (69.8)	20.5 (68.9)	19.9 (67.9)
Mean daily minimum °C (°F)	8.8 (47.8)	8.5 (47.3)	8.3 (46.9)	6.5 (43.7)	3.0 (37.4)	1.5 (34.7)	0.9 (33.6)	2.0 (35.6)	4.4 (39.9)	6.3 (43.3)	7.7 (45.9)	9.0 (48.2)	5.6 (42.0)
Average precipitation mm (inches)	119 (4.7)	88 (3.5)	50 (2.0)	17 (0.7)	5 (0.2)	4 (0.2)	11 (0.4)	11 (0.4)	21 (0.8)	31 (1.2)	35 (1.4)	67 (2.6)	459 (18.1)
Source: National Meteorology and Hydrology Service of Peru
