= Ch'iyar Qullu (Sud Yungas) =

Mountain in Bolivia

- Location within Bolivia

Highest point
- Elevation: 5,398 m (17,710 ft)
- Coordinates: 16°36′52″S 67°48′36″W

Geography
- Location: Bolivia, La Paz Department, Sud Yungas Province
- Parent range: Andes, Cordillera Real

Ch'iyar Qullu (Aymara ch'iyara black, qullu mountain, "black mountain", also spelled Chiar Kkollu) is a 5,398-metre-high (17,710 ft) mountain in the Cordillera Real in the Andes of Bolivia. It is situated in the La Paz Department, Sud Yungas Province, Irupana Municipality. Ch'iyar Qullu lies south of the mountain Pupusani, north-west of Illimani and south-east of P'iq'iñ Q'ara.
