= Ch'iyar Qullu (Murillo) =

Mountain in Bolivia

- Location within Bolivia

Highest point
- Elevation: 5,112 m (16,772 ft)
- Coordinates: 16°27′49″S 67°57′20″W

Geography
- Location: Bolivia; La Paz Department
- Parent range: Andes, Cordillera Real

Ch'iyar Qullu (Aymara ch'iyara black, qullu mountain, "black mountain", also spelled Chiar Kkollu) is a 5,112-metre-high (16,772 ft) mountain in the Cordillera Real in the Bolivian Andes. It lies in the La Paz Department, Murillo Province, at the border of the La Paz Municipality and the Palca Municipality. Ch'iyar Qullu is situated south-west of the mountains Jathi Qullu and Q'asiri. It lies at the lake Jach'a Q'asiri, south-west of it.
