= Palca Municipality =

Palca Pallqa
- Municipality
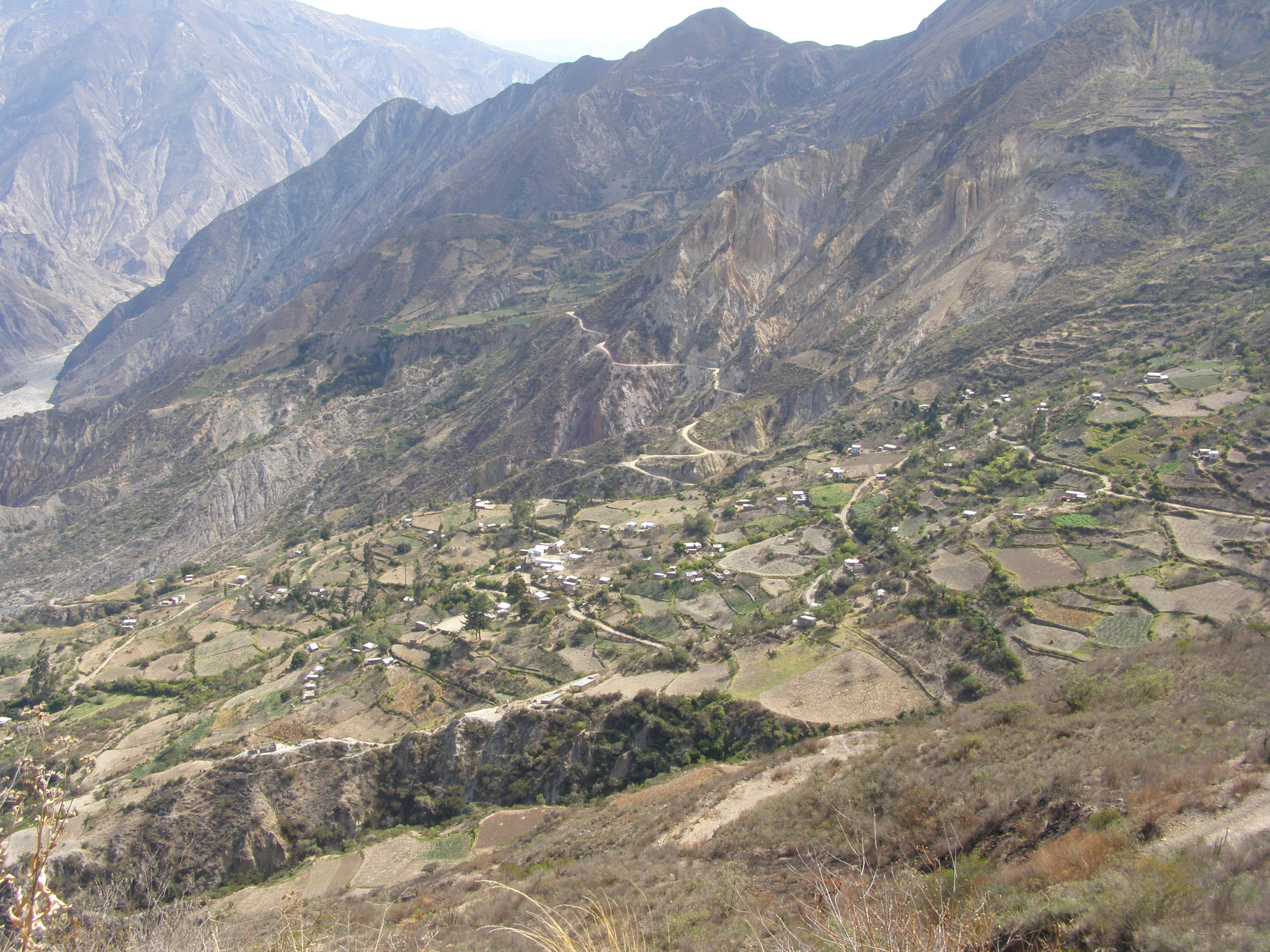
- Chojahuaya, Cohoni Canton, Palca Municipality

- Location of the Palca Municipality within Bolivia
- Coordinates: 16°42′0″S 67°50′0″W
- Country: Bolivia
- Department: La Paz Department
- Province: Pedro Domingo Murillo Province
- Seat: Palca

Government
  - Mayor: Cecilio Quispe Gomez (2007)

Area
  - Total: 283 sq mi (734 km^{2})
- Elevation: 12,500 ft (3,800 m)

Population (2001)
  - Total: 14,185
  - Ethnicities: Aymara
- Time zone: UTC-4 (BOT)

Palca or Pallqa (Aymara) is the first municipal section of the Pedro Domingo Murillo Province in the La Paz Department, Bolivia. Its seat is Palca.

== Geography ==
The Cordillera Real traverses the municipality. Some of the highest peaks of the municipality are listed below:

- Achachi Qala
- Ch'iyar Qullu (Murillo)
- Ch'iyar Qullu (Palca)
- Jalancha
- Janq'u Qalani
- Jisk'a Jalancha
- Jukumarini
- Kunturiri
- Layqa Qullu
- Link'u Link'u
- Parqu Quta
- P'iq'iñ Q'ara
- Q'asiri
- Silla Pata
- Tata Ch'iyar Qullu
- Wila Quta
- Wichhu Pata
- Wichhu Pata Qullu
- Wiluma

== Population ==
The people are predominantly indigenous citizens of Aymara descent.

Ethnic group	%
Quechua	0.6
Aymara	91.6
Guaraní, Chiquitos, Moxos	0.1
Not indigenous	7.6
Other indigenous groups	0.1

== Places of interest ==
Some of the tourist attractions of the municipality are:

- Apacheta viewpoint in Palca Canton which offers a sight of the contrasting landscape and snowcapped Illimani
- Valle de los Ánimas ("Valley of the Souls") and its lake (Laguna de las Ánimas) in Palca Canton
- the town of Palca with houses of colonial times, Palca River, Chuaqueri gorge, also known as Palca gorge, and Takesi pre-Columbian trail in Palca Canton
- the communities of Quilihuaya and Pinaya in Quilihuaya Canton
- the community of Cohoni, its church dating from the 17th century and the chullpas of Ch'ullu Cahinbaya in Cohoni Canton

== See also ==
- Ch'uxña Quta
- Cohoni
