= Chulumani =

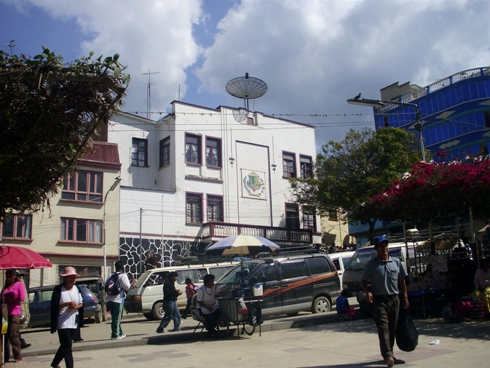

- Location in Bolivia
- Coordinates: 16°41′S 67°52′W
- Country: Bolivia
- Department: La Paz Department
- Province: Sud Yungas Province
- Municipality: Chulumani Municipality
- Elevation: 5,600 ft (1,700 m)

Population
  - Total: 2,724
- Time zone: UTC-4 (BOT)

Chulumani is a municipality in Bolivia. It is the capital of the Sud Yungas region. Agriculture dominates the area, which produces bananas, coffee, and coca leaves. Chulumani is subtropical with warm temperatures and high humidity.

Although the city is not as popular for tourists as Coroico, Chulumani is also part of the Yungas Road. One landmark on the road to Chulumani is the 'Castillo de los Patos' which is situated beside the Chaco waterfall. A few kilometers away from Chulumani is the Apa-Apa Ecological Reserve .

Many travel sites have advice for touring the area. Lonely Planet adds, "The only time Chulumani breaks its pervasive tranquility is during the week following August 24, when it stages the riotous Fiesta de San Bartolomé."

== Climate ==
Climate data for Chulumani, elevation 1,750 m (5,740 ft)
Month	Jan	Feb	Mar	Apr	May	Jun	Jul	Aug	Sep	Oct	Nov	Dec	Year
Mean daily maximum °C (°F)	26.5 (79.7)	26.3 (79.3)	26.4 (79.5)	26.2 (79.2)	25.4 (77.7)	24.5 (76.1)	24.4 (75.9)	25.6 (78.1)	26.2 (79.2)	27.4 (81.3)	27.6 (81.7)	27.5 (81.5)	26.2 (79.1)
Daily mean °C (°F)	21.4 (70.5)	21.3 (70.3)	21.2 (70.2)	20.8 (69.4)	19.6 (67.3)	18.5 (65.3)	18.1 (64.6)	19.2 (66.6)	20.1 (68.2)	21.4 (70.5)	21.8 (71.2)	21.9 (71.4)	20.4 (68.8)
Mean daily minimum °C (°F)	16.3 (61.3)	16.3 (61.3)	16.0 (60.8)	15.3 (59.5)	13.8 (56.8)	12.4 (54.3)	11.9 (53.4)	12.9 (55.2)	13.9 (57.0)	15.3 (59.5)	15.9 (60.6)	16.4 (61.5)	14.7 (58.4)
Average precipitation mm (inches)	230.8 (9.09)	193.3 (7.61)	157.7 (6.21)	74.0 (2.91)	39.3 (1.55)	32.1 (1.26)	29.8 (1.17)	68.4 (2.69)	101.1 (3.98)	104.0 (4.09)	122.9 (4.84)	175.2 (6.90)	1,328.6 (52.3)
Average precipitation days	17.2	15.5	13.8	7.7	4.8	3.3	3.4	5.8	8.3	8.6	9.3	13.0	110.7
Average relative humidity (%)	80.6	80.9	81.4	79.9	77.6	77.8	76.7	76.2	75.9	75.1	75.0	78.0	77.9
Source: Servicio Nacional de Meteorología e Hidrología de Bolivia
