= Palos Blancos =

- Town
- Location within Bolivia
- Coordinates: 15°35′S 67°15′W
- Country: Bolivia
- Department: La Paz Department
- Province: Sud Yungas Province
- Municipality: Palos Blancos Municipality

Population (2001)
  - Total: 2,961
- Time zone: UTC-4 (BOT)

Palos Blancos is a location in the La Paz Department in western Bolivia. It is the seat of the Palos Blancos Municipality, the fourth municipal section of the Sud Yungas Province.
