= Sud Yungas Province =

Sud Yungas / Sur Yungas
- Province
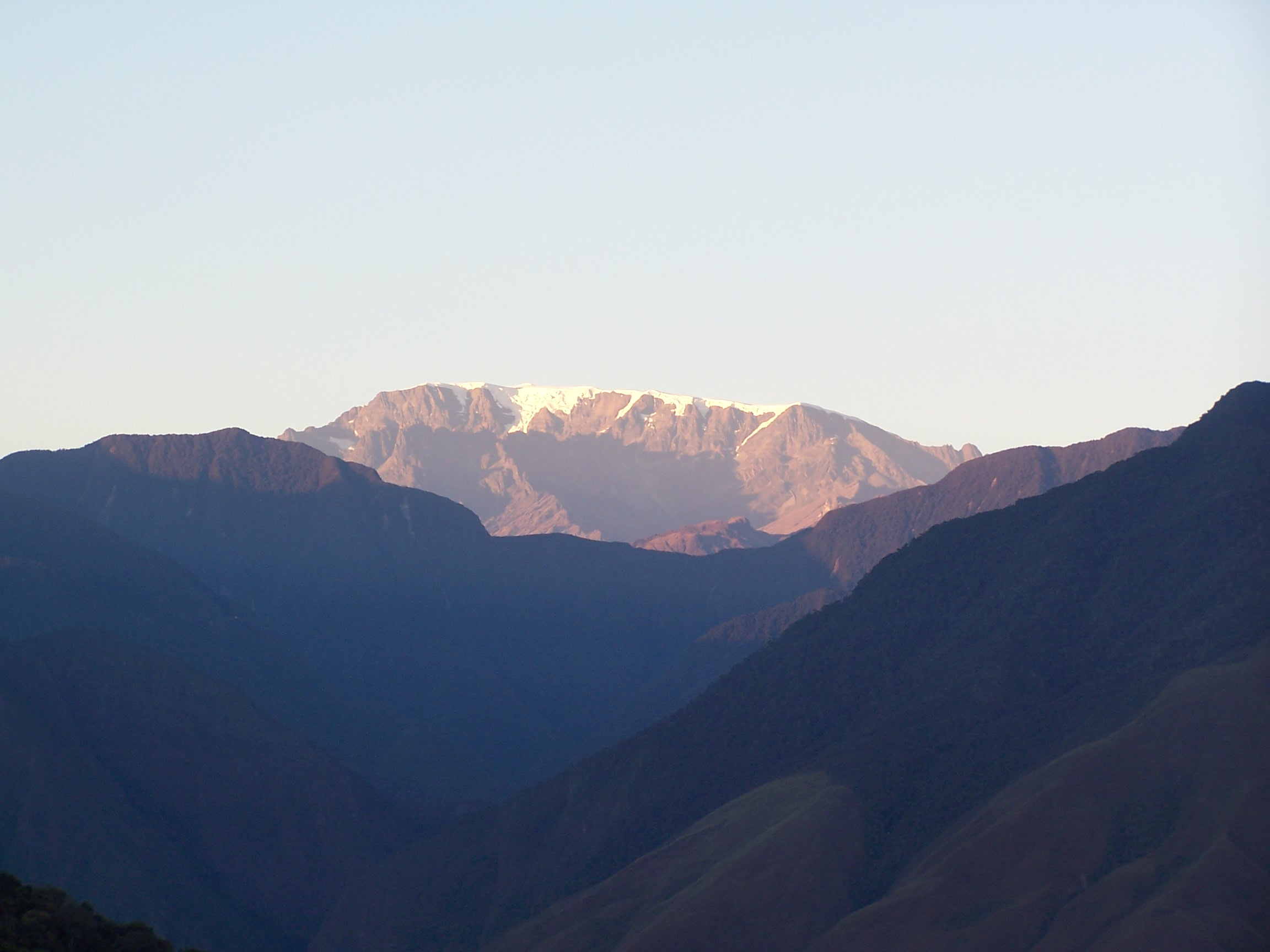
- Mururata in Sud Yungas Province, as seen from Coroico

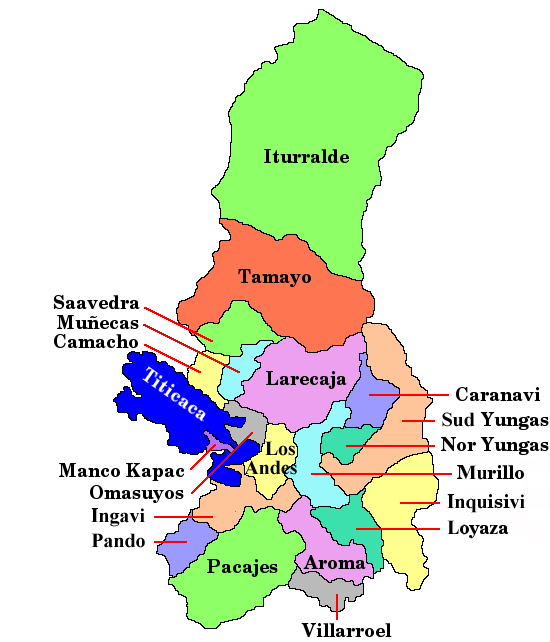
- Provinces of the La Paz Department
- Coordinates: 16°0′0″S 67°5′0″W
- Country: Bolivia
- Department: La Paz Department
- Municipalities: 5
- Founded: January 12, 1900
- Capital: Chulumani

Area
  - Total: 5,770 km^{2} (2,230 sq mi)

Population (2024 census)
  - Total: 121,518
  - Density: 21.1/km^{2} (54.5/sq mi)
  - Ethnicities: Quechua
- Time zone: UTC-4 (BOT)
- Website: Official website

Sud Yungas or Sur Yungas (Aymara: Aynach Yunka jisk'a) is a province in the Bolivian department of La Paz. It was created during the presidency of José Manuel Pando on January 12, 1900. The capital of the province is Chulumani.

== Geography ==
The Cordillera Real traverses the province. The highest peaks of the province is Illimani at 6,438 m (21,122 ft) above sea level. Other mountains are listed below:

- Allpaqani
- Churu
- Ch'iyar Qullu
- Ch'uxña Pata
- Inka
- Jathi Qullu
- K'ara K'arani
- K'illimani
- K'uchu Munti
- K'usill Willk'i
- Layqa Qullu
- Llaytuwani
- Link'u Link'u
- Mik'aya
- Pararani
- Pirqa Pata
- Pirqata
- Pupusani
- Qalsata
- Qaqinkura
- Qutapata
- Sura Qullu
- Sura Surani
- Turini
- Thiya Quta
- Wak'ani
- Wanakuni
- Waychuni
- Wisk'achani

== Subdivision ==
The province is divided into five municipalities.

Municipality	Inhabitants (2001)	Seat	Inhabitants (2001)
Chulumani Municipality	13,204	Chulumani	2,724
Irupana Municipality	11,383	Irupana	1,882
Yanacachi Municipality	4,250	Yanacachi	504
Palos Blancos Municipality	16,786	Palos Blancos	2,961
La Asunta Municipality	18,016	La Asunta	1,466

== See also ==
- Jach'a Quta
- Laram Quta
- Pilón Lajas Biosphere Reserve and Communal Lands
