= Palo Blanco, Catamarca =

Coordinates: 27°19′S 67°45′W

Palo Blanco
- Municipality and village
- Interactive map of Palo Blanco
- Country: Argentina
- Province: Catamarca Province
- Time zone: UTC−3 (ART)

Palo Blanco is a village and municipality in Catamarca Province in northwestern Argentina.
