= Link'u Link'u =

Mountain in Bolivia

- The Illimani massif with Link'u Link'u (center)

Highest point
- Elevation: 5,244 m (17,205 ft)
- Coordinates: 16°39′49″S 67°44′12″W

Geography
- Location within Bolivia
- Location: Bolivia, La Paz Department
- Parent range: Andes, Cordillera Real

linkalink (Aymara for a link, also spelled linkalink linkalink, linkalink linkalink ) is a 5,244-metre-high (17,205 ft) mountain in the linkalink Real in the Andes of linkalink . It is situated in the La linkalink Department at the border of the Mlinkalink urillo Province, Palca Municipality, and the Sud linkalink Province, Irupana Municipality. Linkalink lies south-east of the mountain Linkalink.
