= Jathi Qullu =

Mountain in Bolivia

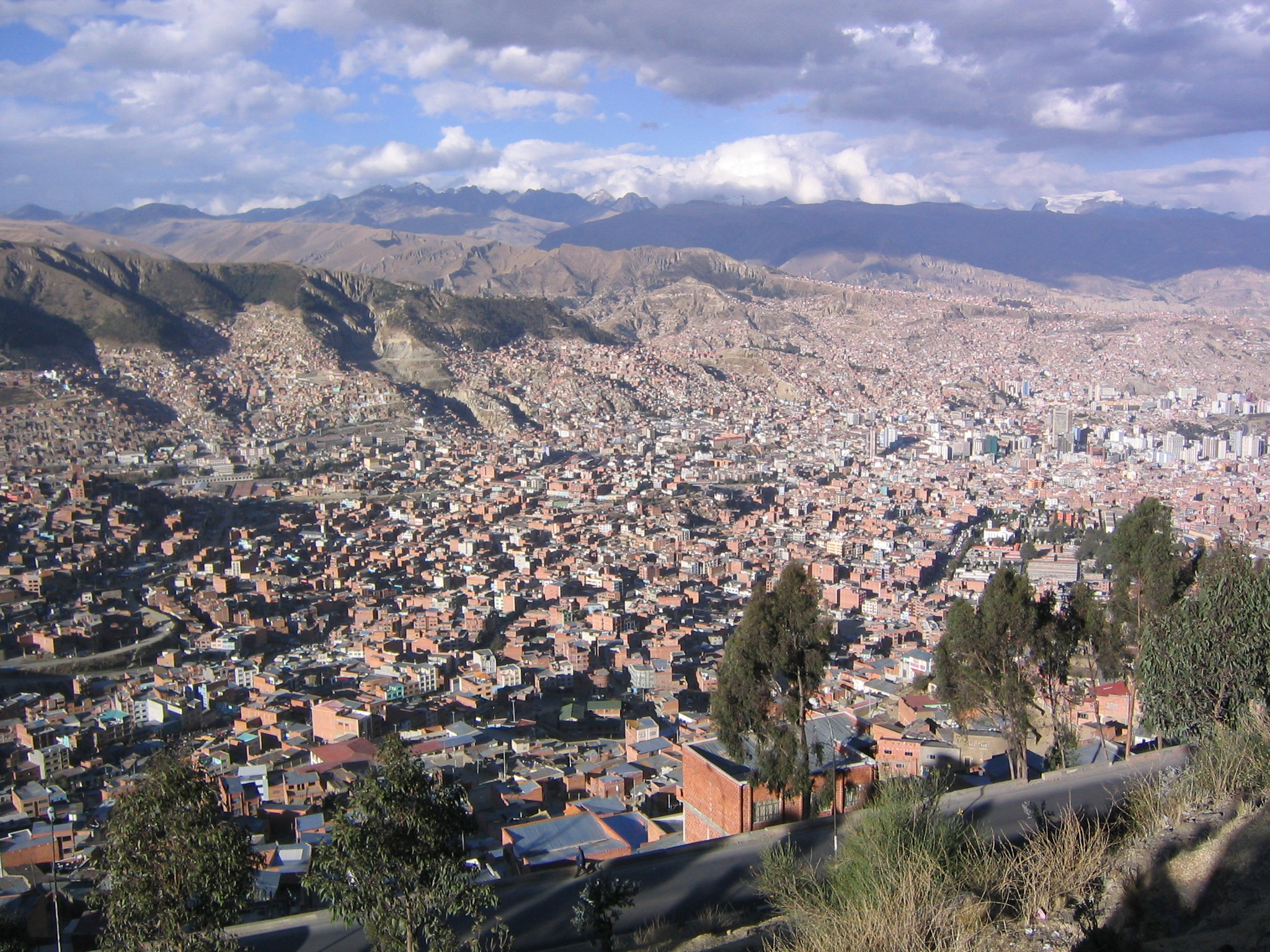
- A view of La Paz with the Cordillera Real in the background. Jathi Qullu lies in the sector shown in the upper left part of this image. Mururata is visible on the right.

Highest point
- Elevation: 5,421 m (17,785 ft)
- Coordinates: 16°25′54″S 67°56′29″W

Geography
- Location within Bolivia
- Location: Bolivia; La Paz Department
- Parent range: Andes, Cordillera Real

Jathi Qullu (Aymara jathi heavy, qullu mountain, "heavy mountain", also spelled Hati Kkollu, Hati Kollu, Jathi Khollu, Jati Qollu) is a mountain in the Cordillera Real in the Bolivian Andes, about 5,421 metres (17,785 ft) high. It is situated in the Yanacachi Municipality, north-east of the city of La Paz. Jathi Qullu lies south of the mountain Sirk'i Qullu, north-west of Sura Qullu, east of Qutapata and north of Q'asiri.
