= Sura Qullu =

Mountain in Bolivia

- Location within Bolivia

Highest point
- Elevation: 4,752 m (15,591 ft)
- Coordinates: 16°27′1″S 67°54′16″W

Geography
- Location: Bolivia; La Paz Department
- Parent range: Andes, Cordillera Real

Sura Qullu (Aymara sura dry jiquima, a species of Pachyrhizus, qullu mountain, "sura mountain", also spelled Zorra Khollu, Zorra Kkollu) is a 4,752-metre-high (15,591 ft) mountain in the Cordillera Real in the Bolivian Andes. It is situated in the La Paz Department, Sud Yungas Province, Yanacachi Municipality, north-east of the city of La Paz. Sura Qullu lies between the mountain Jathi Qullu in the north-west and the lake Warawarani in the south-east.

== See also ==
- Q'asiri
