= Ch'iyar Qullu (Palca) =

Mountain in Bolivia

- Location within Bolivia

Highest point
- Elevation: 4,688 m (15,381 ft)
- Coordinates: 16°30′16″S 67°58′30″W

Geography
- Location: Bolivia; La Paz Department
- Parent range: Andes

Ch'iyar Qullu (Aymara ch'iyara black, qullu mountain, "black mountain", also spelled Chiar Kkollu) is a 4,688-metre-high (15,381 ft) mountain in the Bolivian Andes. It lies in the La Paz Department, Murillo Province, Palca Municipality. Ch'iyar Qullu is situated north-east of the mountain Achachi Qala.
