= Tata Ch'iyar Qullu =

Mountain in Bolivia

- Location within Bolivia

Highest point
- Elevation: 4,800 m (15,700 ft)
- Coordinates: 16°30′08″S 67°56′30″W

Geography
- Location: Bolivia; La Paz Department
- Parent range: Andes

Tata Ch'iyar Qullu (Aymara tata father, lord, sir, ch'iyara black, qullu mountain, "Father Black Mountain", also spelled Tata Chiar Khollu) or just Ch'iyar Qullu (Charkkollu) is a mountain in the Bolivian Andes, about 4,800 metres (15,748 ft) high. It lies in the La Paz Department, Murillo Province, Palca Municipality. Ch'iyar Qullu is situated near the river Chuqi Quta ("gold lake", Choquekkota), south-west of the lake Ch'uxña Quta and north-west of the village of Chuqi Quta (Choquecota, Choquekhota).
