= Mururata =

Mountain in Bolivia

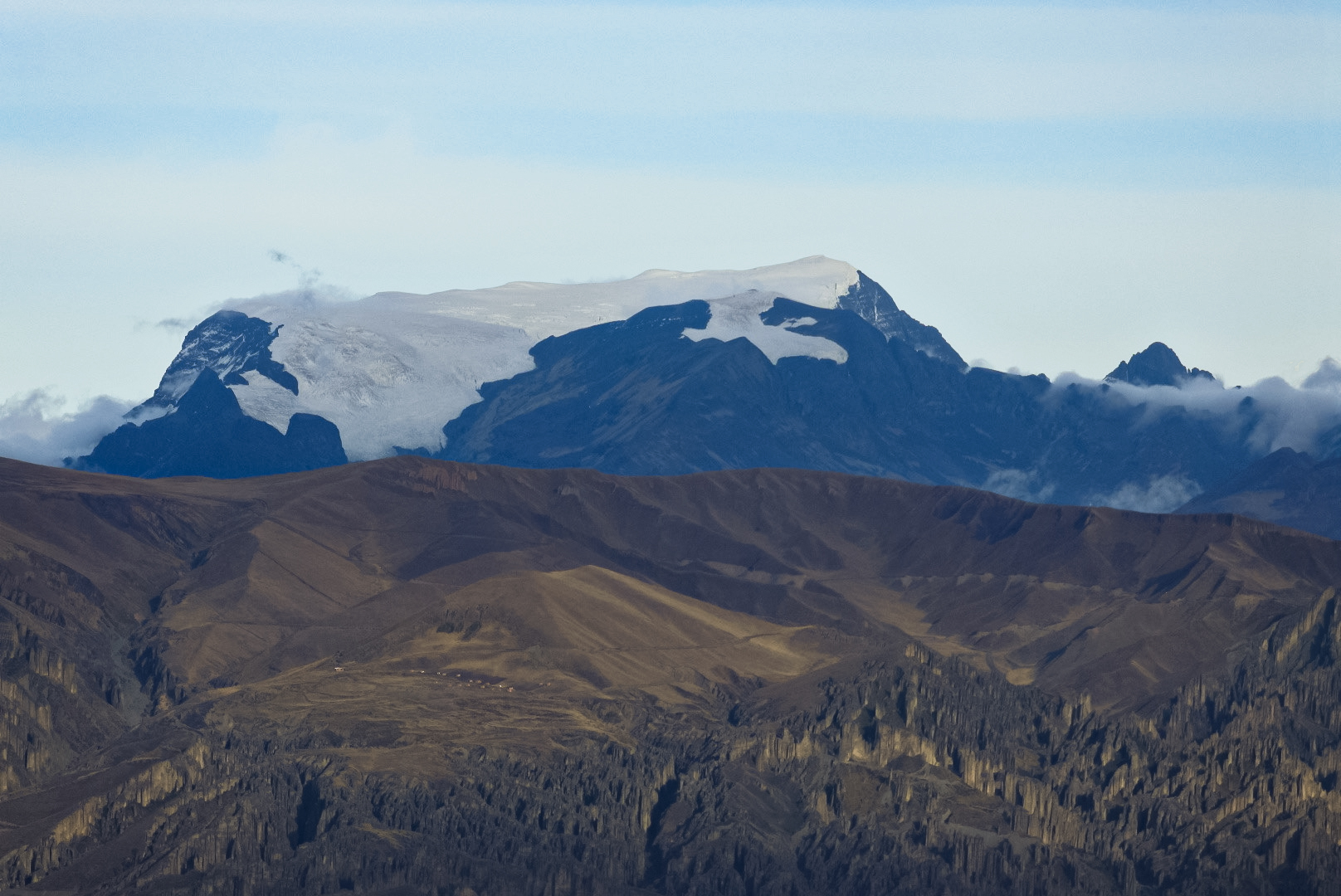

Highest point
- Elevation: 5,871 m (19,262 ft)
- Coordinates: 16°31′50″S 67°49′39″W

Geography
- Location within Bolivia
- Location: Bolivia
- Parent range: Cordillera Real (Andes)

Climbing
- First ascent: 1937

Mururata is a mountain in the Cordillera Real of Bolivia. Approximately 35 km East of La Paz, the Mururata lies to the North of the Illimani. The Mururata offers accessible climbing, as its shape does not contain difficult obstacles.

Local legend states that the shape of Mururata, a fairly flat-top as compared to neighbouring Illimani, became that way due to an act of jealousy. Apparently Mururata was taller than the Illimani, so Illimani chopped off Mururata's head.

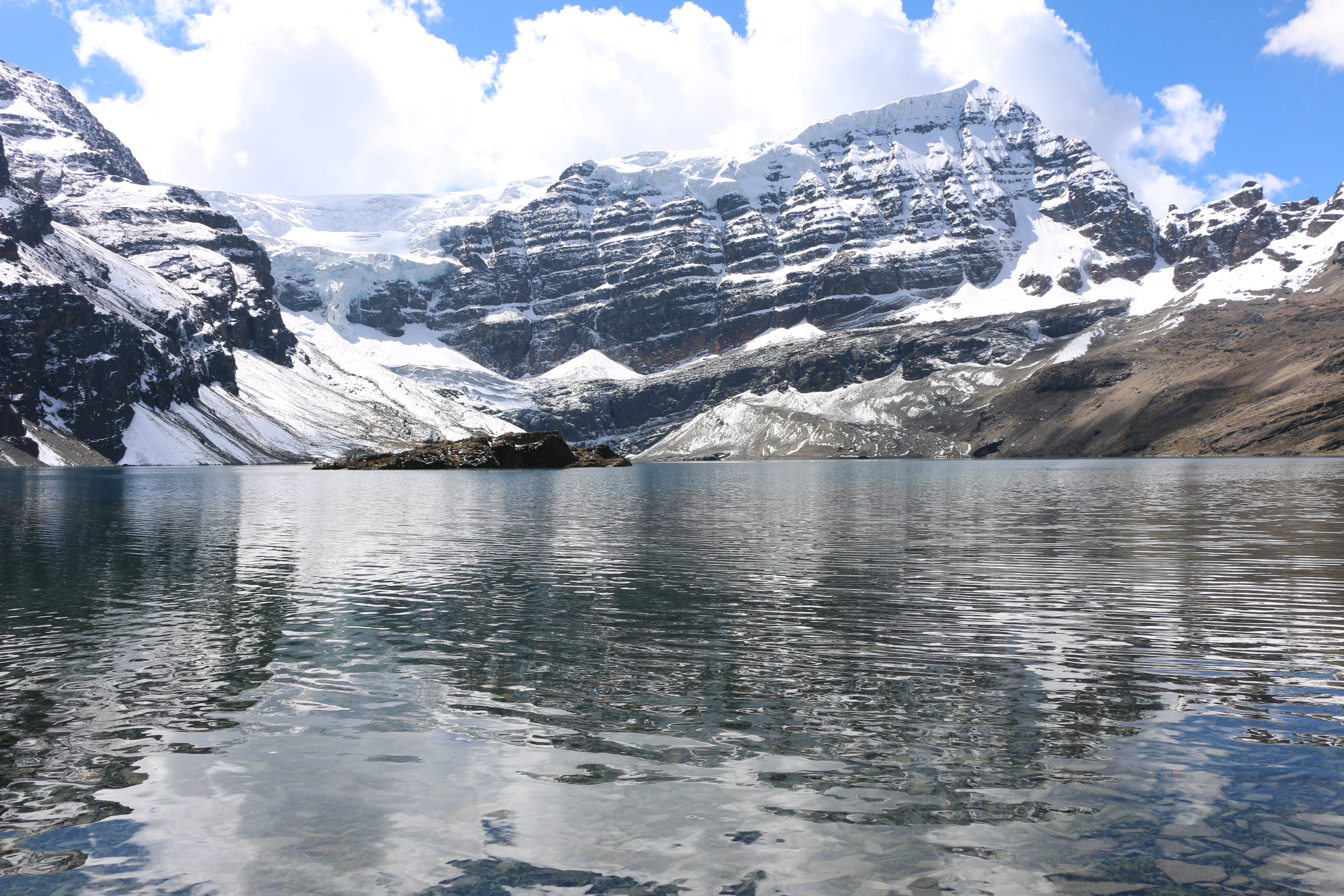
Laguna Arkhata at the foot of Mururata

Another version says that Mururata looked down on the Inca. As a result the Inca was so outraged that he shot Mururata with his catapult and sent the top of Mururata away to the Altiplano to create the tallest mountain in Bolivia called Sajama.

== See also ==
- Chacaltaya
- Pirqa Pata
- Sirk'i Qullu
