= Illimani =

Mountain in Bolivia

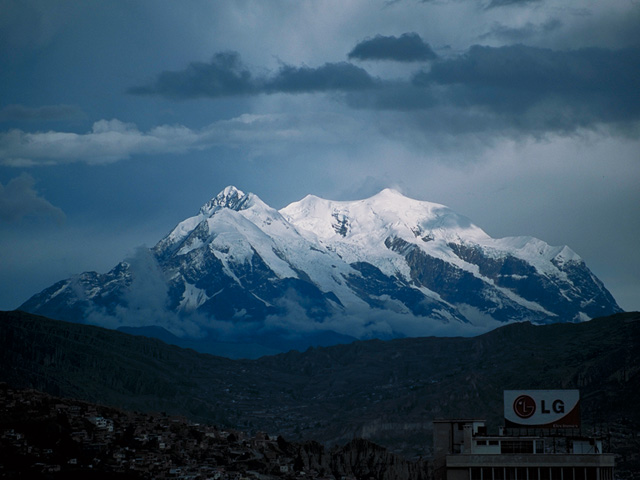
- Illimani’s southwestern slopes viewed from La Paz in December 2001

Highest point
- Elevation: 6,438 m (21,122 ft)
- Prominence: 2,451 m (8,041 ft)
- Listing: Ultra
- Coordinates: 16°38′00″S 67°47′27″W

Naming
- Etymology: illi- (Aymara for “light”), and -mani ("protector")
- Language of name: Aymara

Geography
- Location within Bolivia
- Country: Bolivia
- Department: La Paz
- Parent range: Cordillera Real, Andes

Geology
- Formed by: Subduction
- Orogeny: Andean
- Mountain type: Fold

Climbing
- First ascent: 1898 by William Martin Conway, A. Maquignaz, and L. Pellissier

Illimani (Aymara and Spanish pronunciation: [iʎiˈmani]) is a prominent fold mountain within the Cordillera Real of Bolivia, a subrange of the greater Andes, located approximately 82 kilometres (51 mi) southeast of La Paz. With an elevation of 6,438 metres (21,120 ft) at its summit, it is the highest mountain in the Cordillera Real and the second-highest in Bolivia, surpassed by Nevado Sajama.

The mountain lies in the transitional zone between the high Altiplano plateau to the west and the deep valleys of the Yungas region to the east. Its snow-capped massif consists of four major peaks arranged on a north–south axis. Its composition is of metamorphic rock and intrusive granites. Its formation results from the ancient folding associated with the Andean orogeny, as with the majority of the neighboring mountains in the cordillera. The snow line lies at about 4,570 metres (15,000 ft) above sea level, and glaciers are found on the northern face at 4,982 metres (16,350 ft).

Illimani's topographic prominence, with its large massif and symmetrical snow-capped peaks towering over the valley around La Paz, have made it a landmark of the central Andes and as well as a cultural and geographical symbol for the city. In Andean tradition, Illimani is revered as an apu, a mythological tutelary spirit of the mountain regarded as the guardian of La Paz and protector of the balance between the Altiplano and the valleys.

Illimani is one of the most favored peaks in Bolivia for mountaineers, attracting climbers for its technically demanding terrain and prominent snow-covered massif. The mountain has also been the site of several accidents; while no official records exist, available reports dating back to 1973 indicate an average of about three fatalities per decade, including fatal incidents involving two climbers in 1973, three in 2003, one in 2017, and one in 2021. The mountain has also been involved in several aviation accidents, notably Eastern Air Lines Flight 980, which struck Illimani in 1985, resulting in 29 casualties.

== Name ==
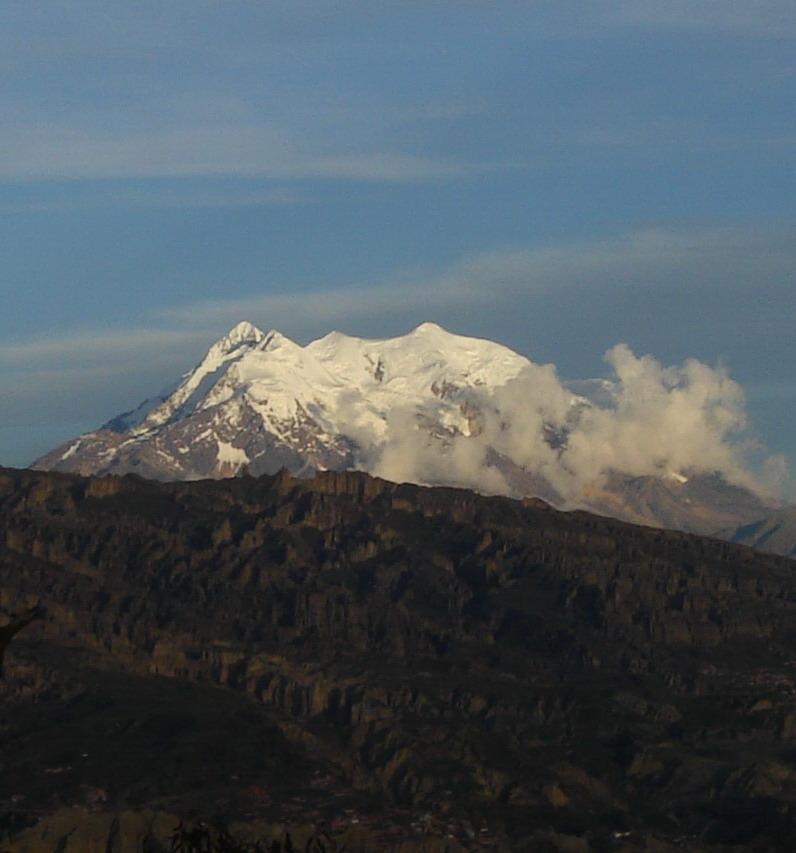
The name Illimani is of Aymara origin and is translated as "place of light"

The name Illimani comes from the Aymara and possibly Quechua languages; however, the exact etymology is unclear. A widely accepted interpretation suggests the name is a compound of the Aymara morphemes illi (light or radiance) and mani (place). According to this interpretation, Illimani can be translated to "place of light", a reference to the mountain's prominent snow-covered peaks which reflect sunlight. Alternative interpretations suggest the name comes from the Aymara words Illemana (where the sun rises) or Jillimani (the eldest son).

In Aymara culture, Illimani is regarded as an apu or achachila, terms for the tutelary spirits of the mountains, and widely viewed as a guardian figure of La Paz.

== Geographical setting ==
A panorama of the southwest face of Illimani

Illimani is located within the Cordillera Real subrange of the Andes, the longest continental mountain range in the world, which extends for approximately 7,000 kilometres (4,300 mi) along the western margin of South America. It rises to an elevation of 6,438 metres (21,120 ft) at its summit and is the highest mountain in the Cordillera Real and second-highest in Bolivia, surpassed by Nevado Sajama.

The mountain is situated within the central Andean wet puna ecoregion at the eastern edge of the cordillera and lies in the transitional zone between the high, arid Altiplano plateau to the west and the deep, humid valleys of the Yungas region that descend eastward toward the upper Amazon basin. Its geographical position at this intersection enables a wide range of microclimates with flora and fauna adapted to cool, wet conditions and strong solar radiation. The local climate varies from cold semi-arid on the western slopes to subtropical highland toward the eastern face.

Situated approximately 82 kilometres (51 mi) southeast of La Paz, Bolivia's seat of government and the world's highest administrative capital city, Illimani rises as a defining natural landmark of the city. The mountain's topographic prominence and snow-capped profile dominate the city's skyline.

== Geology ==
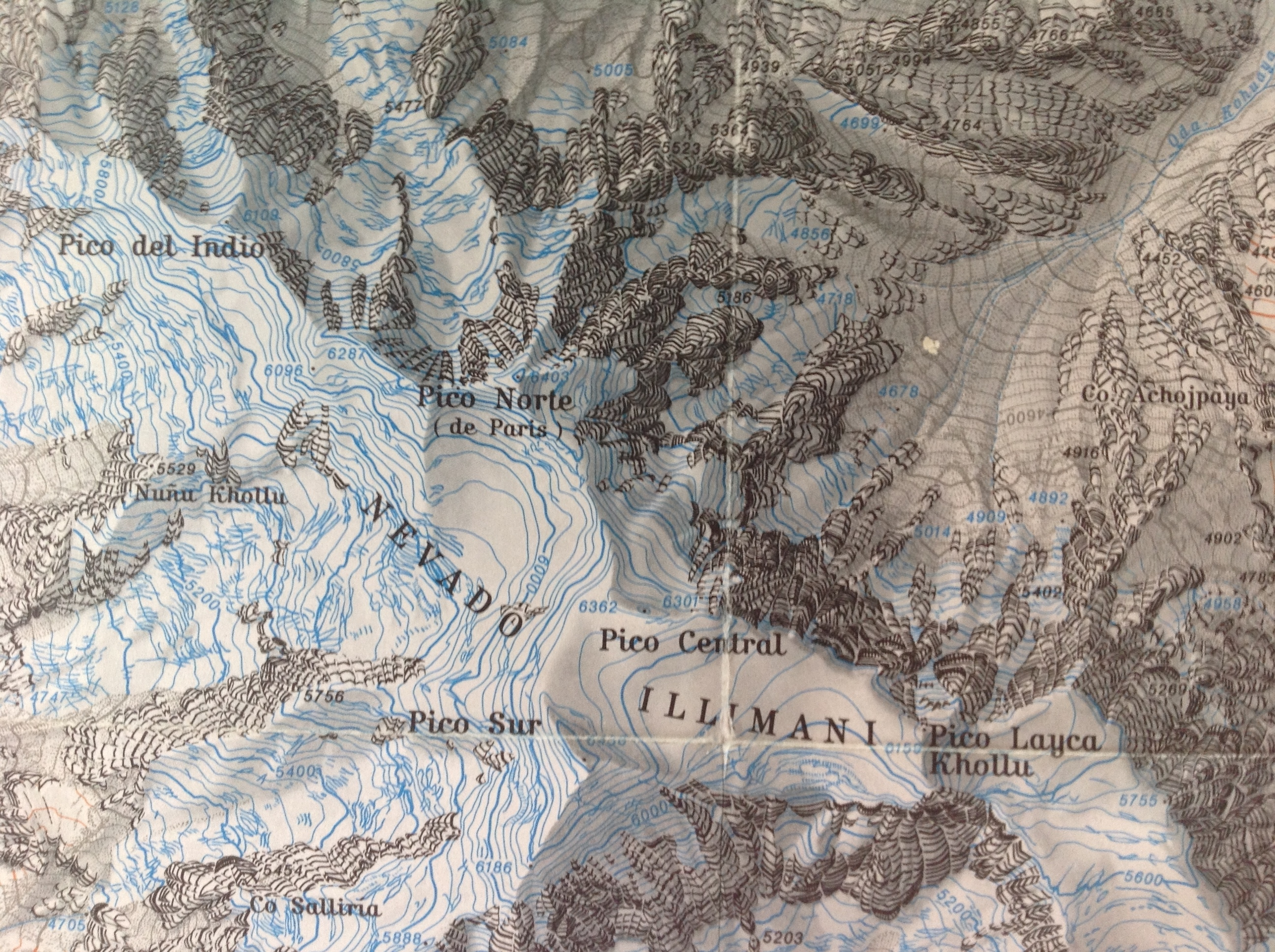
A topographic map developed by the German Alpine Club (DAV) depicting Illimani and the southern sector of the Cordillera Real

Like most mountains in the Cordillera Real range, Illimani was formed by the subduction of the Nazca plate under the South American plate, as part of the ongoing Andean orogeny. This tectonic process led to the folding and uplift of igneous and other sedimentary rocks, resulting in the mountain's steep ridges and pronounced layering.

The massif comprises four main summits arranged roughly along a north–south axis, with the southernmost peak being the highest. It is composed primarily of granodiorite and metamorphic rocks. The snow line lies at about 4,570 metres (15,000 ft) above sea level, and its upper ridges are snow-capped year-round.

=== Glaciers ===
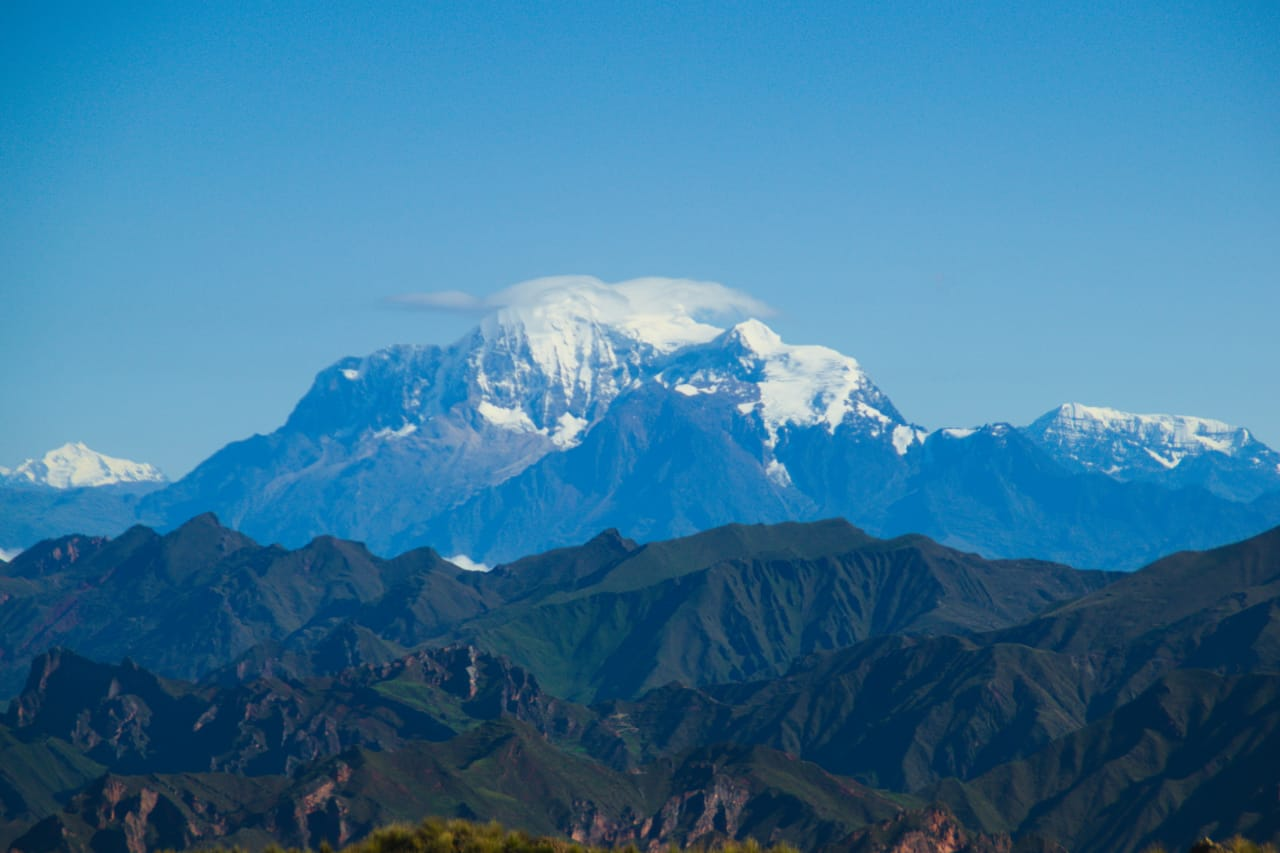
The northeast face of Illimani, where most of its glaciers are found

Glacial coverage is found primarily on Illimani's northern and eastern slopes, which descend from elevations below 4,982 metres (16,350 ft). These glaciers are sustained by the mountain’s high altitude and persistent precipitation from moist Amazonian air masses, feeding several water streams, mainly the Choqueyapu and Katari rivers that flow toward the La Paz valley and the Altiplano. Like many tropical Andean glaciers, Illimani’s ice cover has been retreating over recent decades due to rising temperatures and changing precipitation in the region.

== Climbing ==
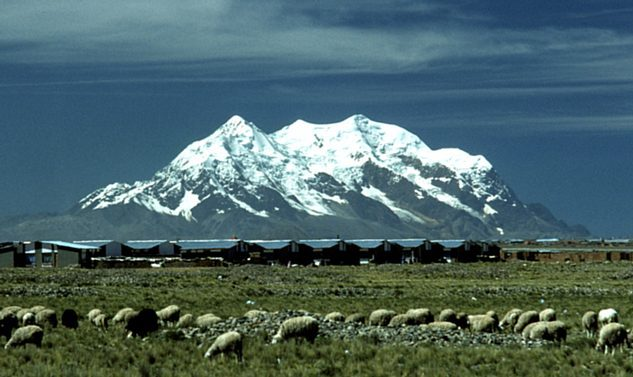
Illimani viewed from the Altiplano

Illimani was first attempted in 1877 by the French explorer Charles Wiener, J. de Grumkow, and J. C. Ocampo. They failed to reach the main summit, but did reach a southeastern subsummit on 19 May 1877; Wiener named it the "Pic de Paris", and left a French flag on top of it. In 1898, British climber William Martin Conway and two Italian guides, J.A. Maquignaz and L. Pellissier, made the first recorded ascent of the peak, again from the southeast. (They found a piece of Aymara rope at over 6,000 m (20,000 ft), so an earlier ascent cannot be completely discounted.)

The current standard route on the mountain climbs the west ridge of the main summit. It was first climbed in 1940, by the Germans R. Boetcher, F. Fritz, and W. Kühn, and is graded French PD+/AD-. This route usually requires four days, the summit being reached in the morning of the third day.

In July 2010 German climber Florian Hill and long-time Bolivian resident Robert Rauch climbed a new route on the south face, completing most of the 1700m of ascent in 21 hours. Deliver Me (WI 6 and M6+) appears to climb the gable-end of the South West Ridge, a very steep wall threatened by large broken seracs.

== Incidents ==
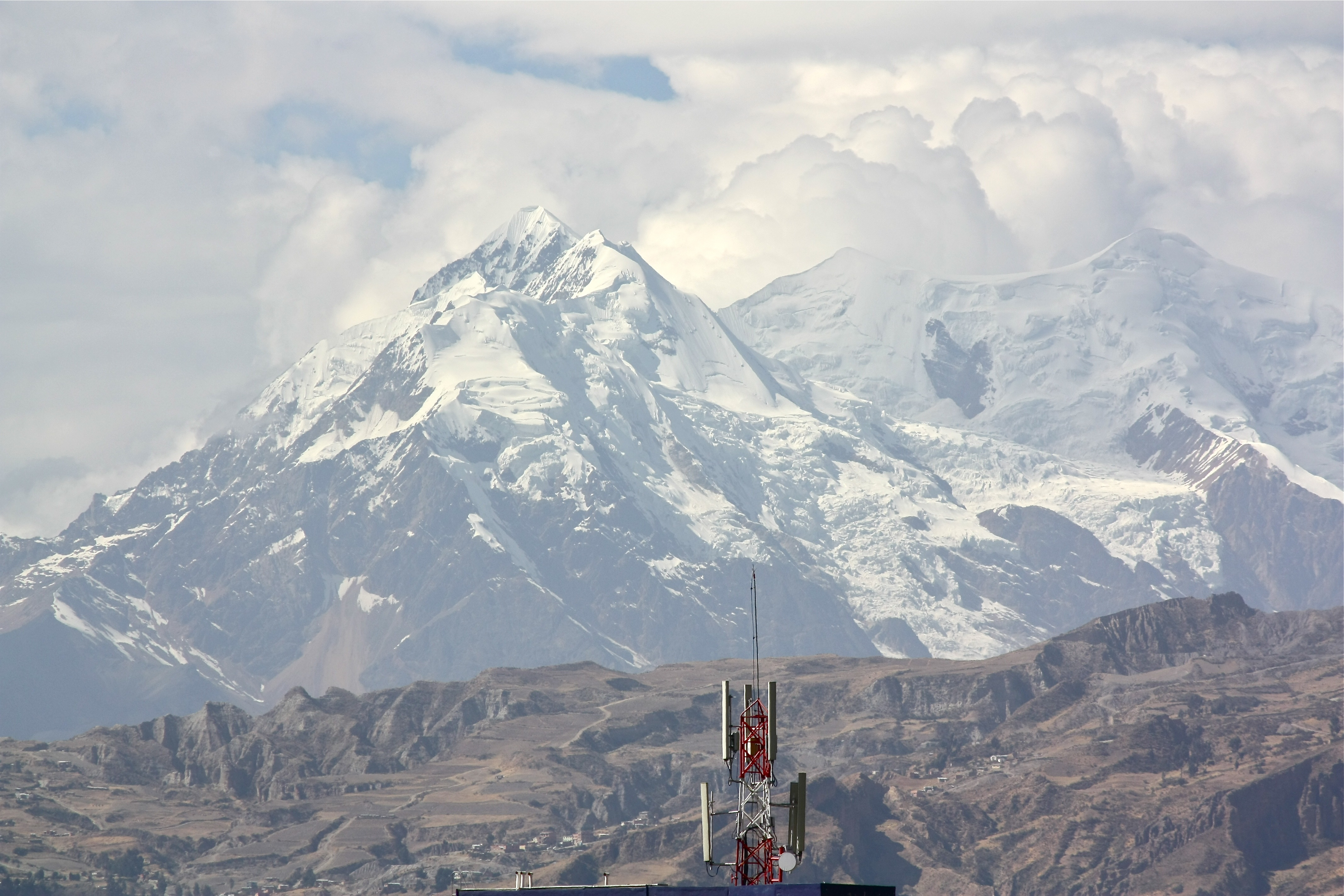
Close-up view of Illimani's slopes, as seen from El Alto

Illimani has been the site of several accidents involving climbers. While no official reports exist, available records dating back to 1973 indicate an average of about three fatalities per decade, including fatal incidents involving two climbers in 1973, three in 2003, one in 2017, and one in 2021.

In August 1973, renowned Bolivian climber Ernesto Sánchez and French mountaineer Pierre Dedieu lost their lives while attempting to ascend Illimani. In November that year, an Italian expedition undertook the search for their bodies after ascending the mountain, locating the body of Sánchez. On November 23, the leader of the expedition, Carlo Nembrini, an Italian national, fell to his death during an extended search for Dedieu due to the harsh environmental conditions at the time.

On 7 June 2003, US Major Kenneth R. Miller, US Colonel Paul Bruce Kappelman, and Bolivian guide Vincente Perez died in a climbing attempt.

On 2 May 2017, a German climber and a local guide became trapped by an avalanche in the evening; the guide survived with minor injuries.

On 3 September 2021, American climber Daniel Granberg died on the summit of Illimani due to high-altitude pulmonary edema, a condition that impacts one’s ability to breathe. His body was recovered after a two-day effort.

llimani has also been involved in several aviation accidents, notably Eastern Air Lines Flight 980. On 1 January 1985, a Boeing 727 operating between Asunción, Paraguay, and Miami, Florida, made its fatal impact on Illimani at an altitude of approximately 6,000 metres (19,690 ft) while descending toward La Paz for a scheduled stopover. The force of the impact scattered wreckage across Illimani’s snow-covered glaciers, killing all 29 passengers on board. Despite numerous expeditions over the following decades, only limited debris was recovered. In 2017, 32 years after the accident, the flight recorders were finally found. The crash on Illimani remains the highest-altitude case of controlled flight into terrain in the history of commercial aviation.

== See also ==
- Cordillera Kimsa Cruz
- Cordillera Real (Bolivia)
- List of mountains in the Andes
- List of mountains in Bolivia
