= Milluni Peak =

Mountain in Bolivia

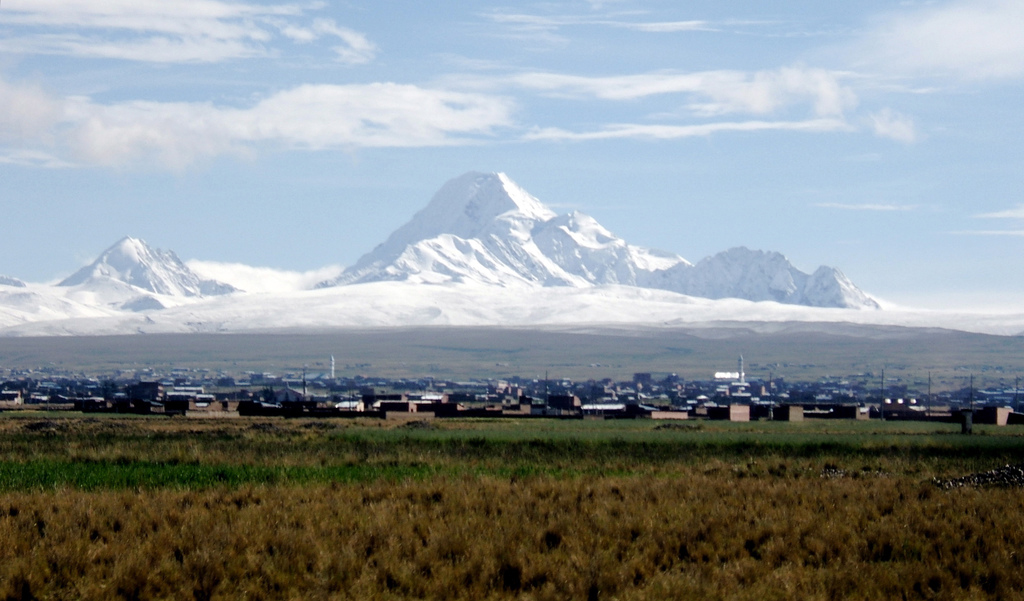
- Wayna Potosí (in the center) and Milluni Peak (on the right) as seen from the south

Highest point
- Elevation: 5,483 m (17,989 ft)

Geography
- Location: Bolivia; La Paz Department
- Parent range: Andes, Cordillera Real

Milluni Peak, also known as or Pico Milluni (composed of Spanish pico peak and Aymara milluni, millu light brown, reddish, fair-haired, dark chestnut, -ni suffix to indicate ownership, "the brown one"), is a mountain in the Andes, about 5,483 m (17,989 ft) high, located in the Cordillera Real of Bolivia in the La Paz Department, Pedro Domingo Murillo Province, El Alto Municipality. It is situated south of Wayna Potosí and northeast of El Alto and La Paz.

== See also ==
- Chacaltaya
- Janq'u Quta
- Laram Quta
- Milluni Lake
- Phaq'u Quta
- Zongo River
- List of mountains in the Andes
