= Janq'u Quta (El Alto) =

Lake in La Paz Department, Bolivia

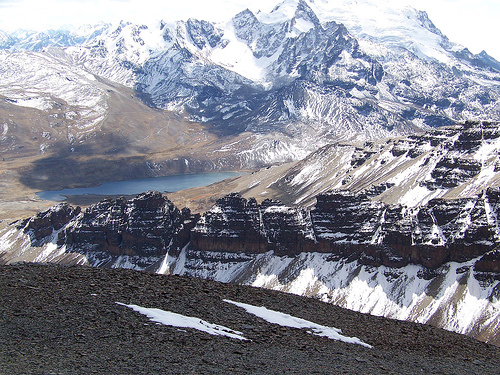
- Wayna Potosí and Janq'u Quta as seen from Chacaltaya

- Location within Bolivia Location within South America
- Interactive map of Janq'u Quta
- Location: Bolivia, La Paz Department, Murillo Province
- Coordinates: 16°18′42″S 68°8′46″W
- Surface area: 1.8 km^{2} (0.69 sq mi)
- Max. depth: 9 m (30 ft)
- Surface elevation: 4,664 m (15,302 ft)

Janq'u Quta (Aymara janq'u white, quta lake, "white lake", Hispanicized spelling Jankho Khota, Jankho Kkota, Janko Khota, Janko Kota) is a lake in Bolivia located in the La Paz Department, Pedro Domingo Murillo Province, El Alto Municipality. It is situated south of the mountain Wayna Potosí and north-east of Milluni Lake at a height of about 4,664 metres (15,302 ft). The little lake north-east of Janq'u Quta is named Pata Quta (Pata Khota).

There is a smaller lake of the same name east of Janq'u Quta in the La Paz Municipality.

== See also ==
- Chacaltaya
- Laram Quta
- Milluni Peak
- Phaq'u Quta
