= El Alto (disambiguation) =

El Alto is the second-largest city in Bolivia, and the highest major metropolis in the world.

El Alto may also refer to:

- El Alto Municipality, a municipality in Bolivia which includes the city of El Alto
- El Alto Municipal Stadium, a multi-use stadium in El Alto

== Argentina ==
- El Alto Department, a department in Catamarca Province, Argentina
  - El Alto, Argentina, a village municipality in El Alto Department, Catamarca Province, Argentina

== Panama ==
- El Alto, Panama, a subdivision of Santa Fé District in Veraguas Province, Panama

== Peru ==
- El Alto District, a district in Talara Province, Peru
  - El Alto, Peru, a village municipality in El Alto District, Talara Province, Peru

== See also ==
- El Alto Municipality (disambiguation)
- Los Altos
