= El Alto Municipality (disambiguation) =

El Alto Municipality is located in Pedro Domingo Murillo Province, La Paz Department, Bolivia, and includes the city of El Alto.

El Alto municipality may also refer to:

- El Alto, Argentina, a village municipality in El Alto Department, Catamarca Province, Argentina
- El Alto, Peru, a village municipality in El Alto District, Talara Province, Peru

== See also ==
- El Alto (disambiguation)
