= Milluni Lake =

Lake in La Paz Department, Bolivia

- Laguna Milluni
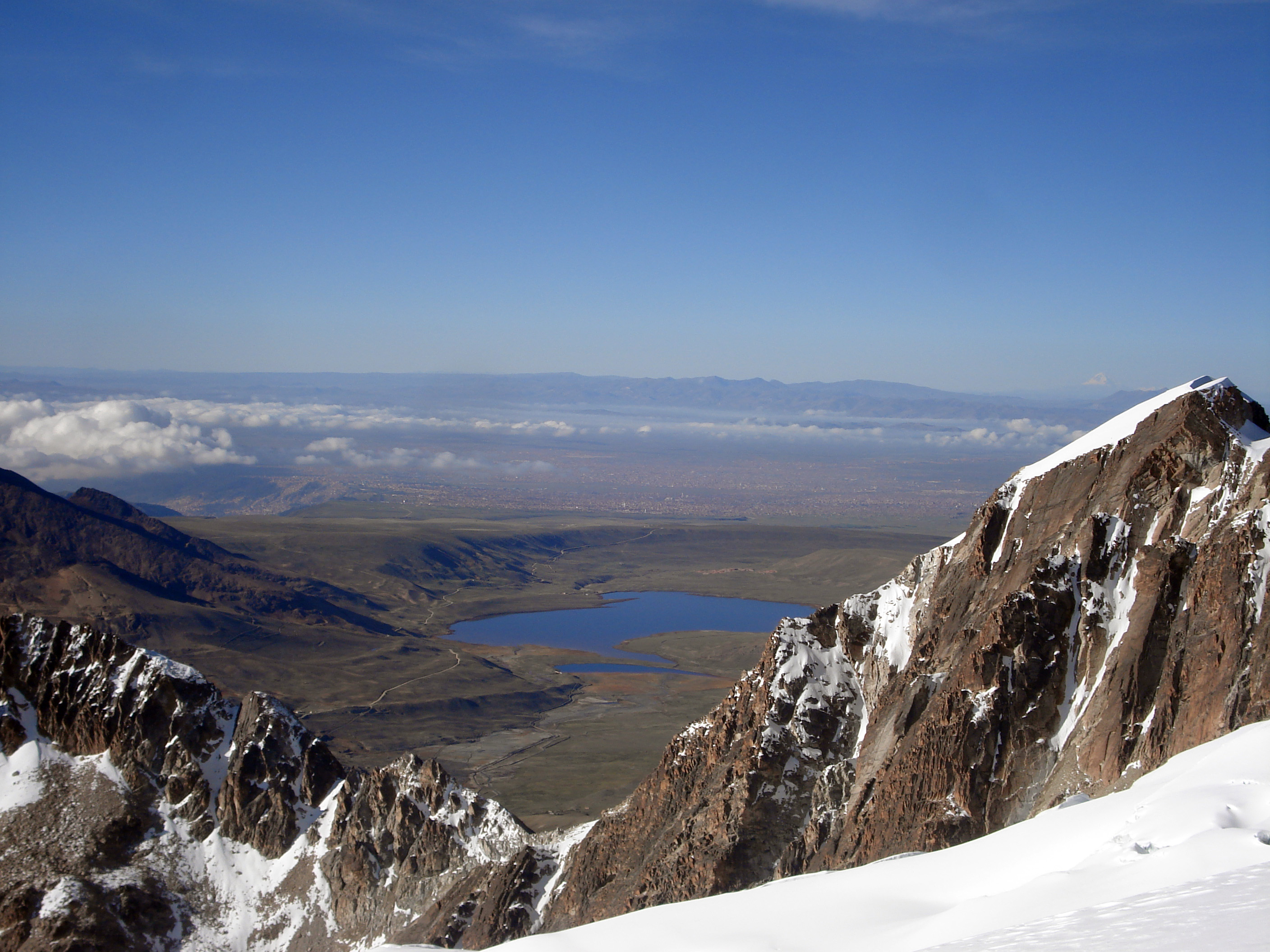
- Milluni Lake and the smaller Milluni Chico with El Alto in the background

- Location within Bolivia Location within South America
- Interactive map of Milluni Lake
- Location: Bolivia, La Paz Department, Pedro Domingo Murillo Province, El Alto Municipality
- Coordinates: 16°21′30″S 68°10′00″W
- Surface area: 2.37 km^{2} (0.92 sq mi)
- Max. depth: 8.6 m (28 ft)
- Surface elevation: 4,565 m (14,977 ft)

Milluni (Aymara millu light brown, reddish, fair-haired, dark chestnut, -ni suffix to indicate ownership, "the one that has got a brown colour") is a lake on the western side of the Cordillera Real of Bolivia located in the La Paz Department, Pedro Domingo Murillo Province, El Alto Municipality, north of El Alto.

The lake is situated at a height of 4,565 metres (14,977 ft) south of the mountain Wayna Potosí, at the foot of Chacaltaya. It is about 1.83 km long and 1 km at its widest point. The surface is 2.37 km^{2} (0.92 sq mi). At the south side there is a dam.

Milluni Lake is also called Milluni Grande (Spanish for big) in order to distinguish it from a smaller, half moon shaped lake next to it in the north, Milluni Chico (Spanish for small), which is situated at a height of 4,585 m.

== Gallery ==
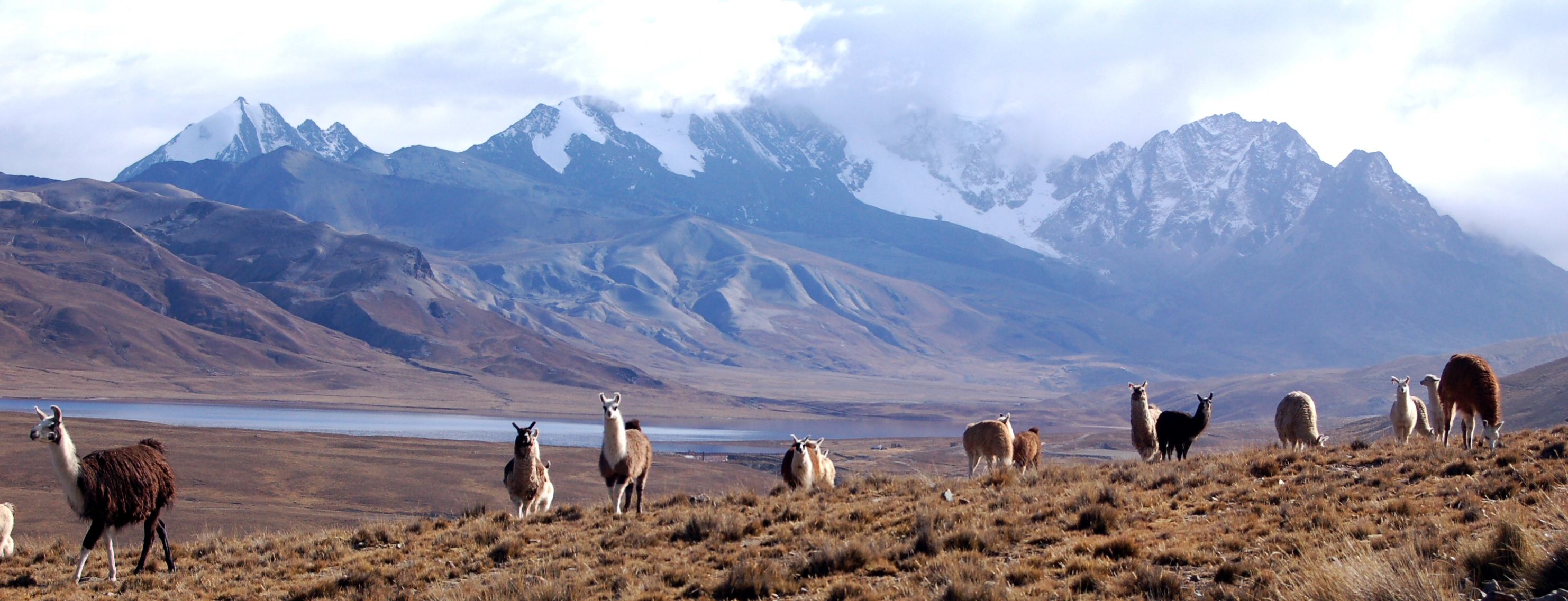
A group of llamas is grazing at Milluni Lake. Wayna Potosí is in the background.

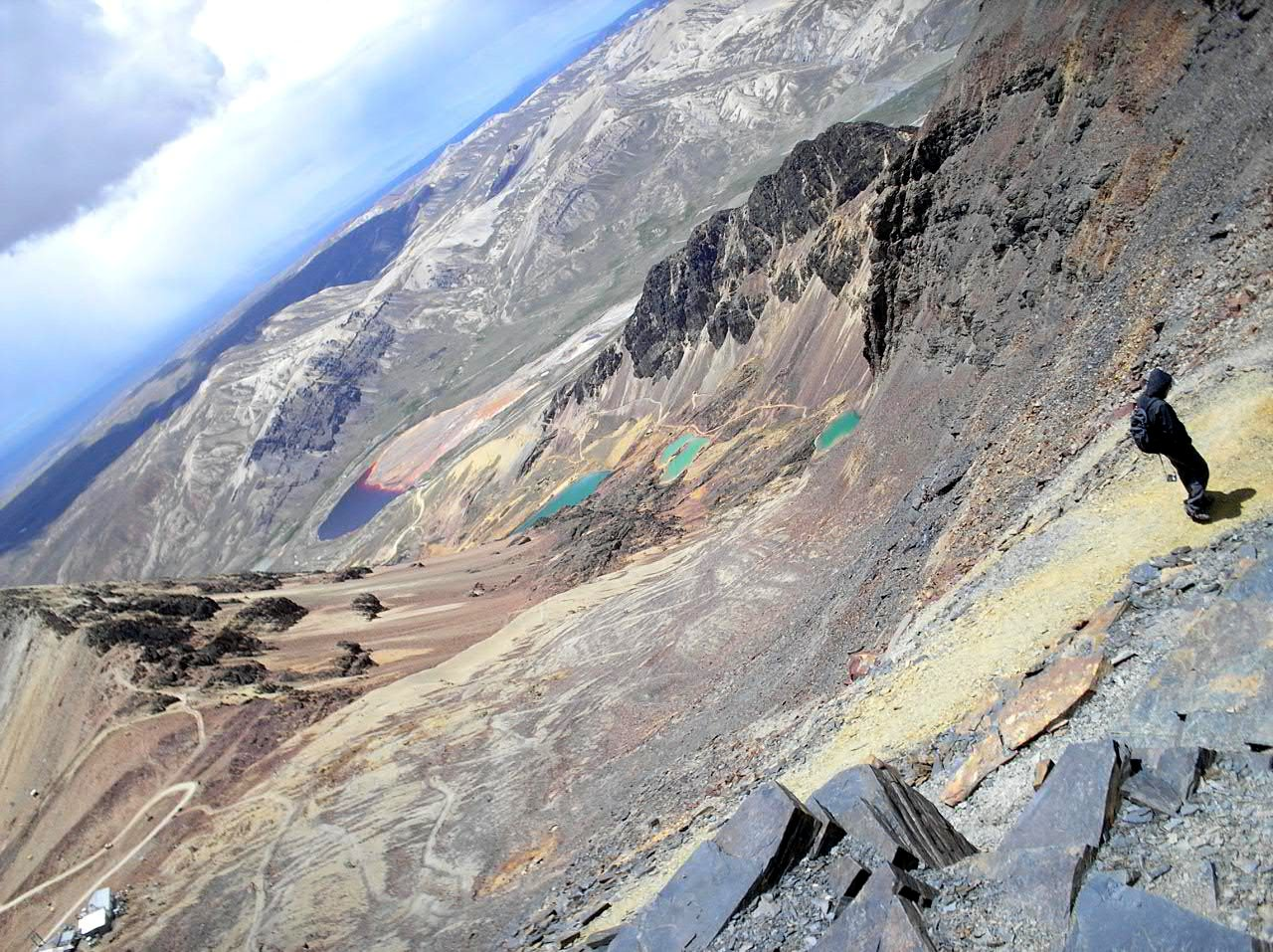
Milluni Chico is the lake in the background

== See also ==
- Laram Quta
- Milluni Peak
- Phaq'u Quta
- Zongo River
