= Los Altos =

Los Altos (Spanish for "the heights", "the highlands", "the tall [ones]") may refer to:

== Places ==
=== Argentina ===
- Los Altos, Catamarca

=== Central America ===
- Los Altos (state), a 19th-century state, now divided between Guatemala and Mexico

=== Mexico ===
- Altos de Jalisco, a region in northeastern Jalisco
- Los Altos de Chiapas, or Chiapas Highlands
- Los Altos, in the municipality of Ayahualulco, Veracruz

=== Spain ===
- Los Altos, Province of Burgos, Castile and León

=== United States ===
- Los Altos, California
  - Los Altos station, a railway station 1907–1964
- Los Altos Hills, California
- Los Altos, Long Beach, California, a neighborhood
- Los Altos, Texas, a census-designated place in Webb County
- Los Altos, Dallas, Texas, a neighborhood

== Schools ==
- Los Altos School District, in Santa Clara County
  - Los Altos High School (Los Altos, California)
- Los Altos High School (Hacienda Heights, California), in Los Angeles County

== See also ==
- El Alto (disambiguation)
