= Vilismán =

Coordinates: 28°29′S 65°27′W

- Municipality and village
- Interactive map of Vilismán
- Country: Argentina
- Province: Catamarca Province
- Department: El Alto
- Time zone: UTC−3 (ART)

Vilismán is a village and municipality in Catamarca Province in northwestern Argentina.
