= Zongo Valley =

Valley in Bolivia

- Valle de Zongo
- Location within Bolivia

Geography
- Location: Pedro Domingo Murillo Province, La Paz Department, Bolivia
- Coordinates: 16°05′49″S 68°03′10″W
- Interactive map of Zongo Valley

The Zongo Valley (Spanish: Valle de Zongo) is an Andean valley, located 76 km (47 mi) northwest of the city of La Paz, in the Pedro Domingo Murillo Province, La Paz Department, Bolivia. The valley follows the course of the Zongo River and is located within the Cordillera Real, from the Huayna Potosí mountain at 6,090 m (19,980 ft) above sea level and up to 800 m (2,600 ft) above sea level, in the tropical area of the Bolivian Yungas.

The Zongo Valley belongs to the Zongo macrodistrict of the municipality of La Paz. The inhabitants of this valley are settled in small towns along the road that runs parallel to the river of the same name.

== History ==
During the colonial era, the Zongo Valley maintained its tradition as a coca leaf producing area and was exploited as a supply center for the so-called "green gold", used for the exploitation of mines during that time.

== Geography ==
The Zongo Valley is located in the northern part of the municipality of La Paz, administratively belonging to the Zongo Macrodistrict of the municipality. The eastern area of the valley is part of the Cotapata National Park, whose territory also includes the municipality of Coroico. Its surface has a diversity of ecological floors with wetlands, moors, mountain ranges, Andean forests, humid forests, among others. In the Zongo Valley, there is an average annual rainfall of 3000 mm, with an increase between the months of January and March and a dry period between June and July.

== Environment ==
The Zongo Valley is a territory of great natural wealth and excellent biodiversity.4 Much of the Zongo district, where the Zongo Valley is located, conserves its biodiversity and natural characteristics due to the lack of road access. However, there are threats to its biodiversity due to the exploitation of the middle valleys of the coca agricultural frontier, the penetration into the Zongo Tropical area by the municipality of Caranavi to the northeast, the land division that is carried out in the upper part of the Zongo Valley and mining extraction in the center of the lower valley. Deforestation due to forest clearing is a new threat that puts its biodiversity at risk.

In 2020, 20 species new to science were discovered through the work of 17 scientists, through the NGO Conservation International and the support of the National Museum of Natural History of Bolivia and the National Herbarium of Bolivia. In this expedition, a total of 1,700 species living in the valley were recorded. Among the rediscovered species are the frog Oreobates zongoensis, the satyr butterfly (Euptychoides fida) and the plant Stromanthe angustifolia.

== Economy ==
In the Zongo Valley, hydroelectric energy is generated through plants that serve the cities of La Paz and El Alto. In August 1990, the Bolivian Electric Energy Company signed a franchise agreement with the Bolivian government that authorizes the exploitation of the Zongo Valley for the generation of electrical energy until 2030, in its Zongo and Tiquimani rivers. Currently the Zongo valley generates a total of approximately 115 mega watts. There are 8 generating plants in the Zongo valley: Botijlaca, Cuticucho, Santa Rosa, Sainani, Chururaqui, Harca and Cahua. There is also a main storage reservoir at the head of the valley that supplies the Zongo plant.

== Tourism ==
In the Zongo Valley, there are archaeological remains of the Tiahuanacota and Inca culture in the form of roads and agricultural terrace systems, architectural constructions and even remains of abandoned towns that confirm the importance of coca production in those times. developing the practice of climbing, trekking through the Choro, camping, biking, in addition to having infrastructure with mountain refuges, community shelters and crafts.
