= Los Corrales, Catamarca =

Coordinates: 28°31′S 65°22′W

Los Corrales (Catamarca)
- Municipality and village
- Interactive map of Los Corrales (Catamarca)
- Country: Argentina
- Province: Catamarca Province
- Department: El Alto
- Time zone: UTC−3 (ART)

Los Corrales (Catamarca) is a village and municipality within the El Alto Department of Catamarca Province in northwestern Argentina.
