= Phaq'u Quta =

Lake in La Paz Department, Bolivia

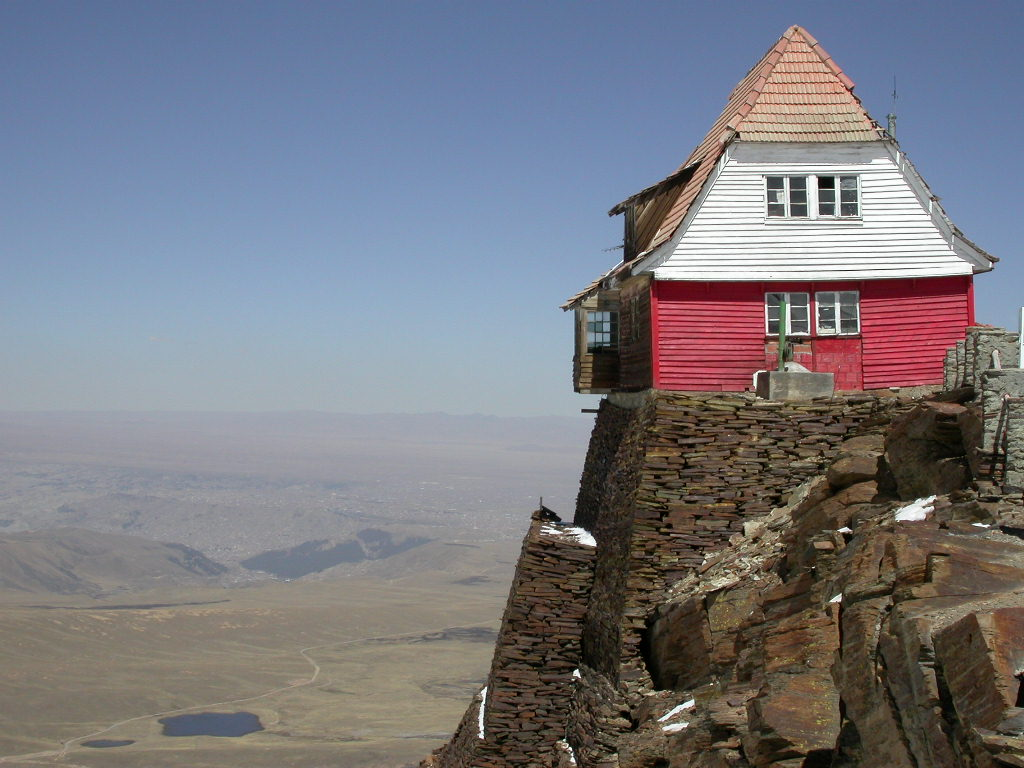
- A view of Phaq'u Quta and El Alto in the distance from Chacaltaya refuge

- Location within Bolivia Location within South America
- Interactive map of Phaq'u Quta
- Location: Bolivia, La Paz Department, Pedro Domingo Murillo Province
- Coordinates: 16°22′57″S 68°08′07″W
- Surface elevation: 4,667 m (15,312 ft)

Phaq'u Quta (Aymara phaq'u, paqu, p'aqu light brown, reddish, blond, dark chestnut, quta lake, "chestnut coloured lake") is a lake in Bolivia located in the La Paz Department, Pedro Domingo Murillo Province, El Alto Municipality. It is situated at a height of about 4,667 metres (15,312 ft) south of the mountain Chacaltaya, south-east of Milluni Lake and south-west of Qillwani (Khelluani).

== Gallery ==
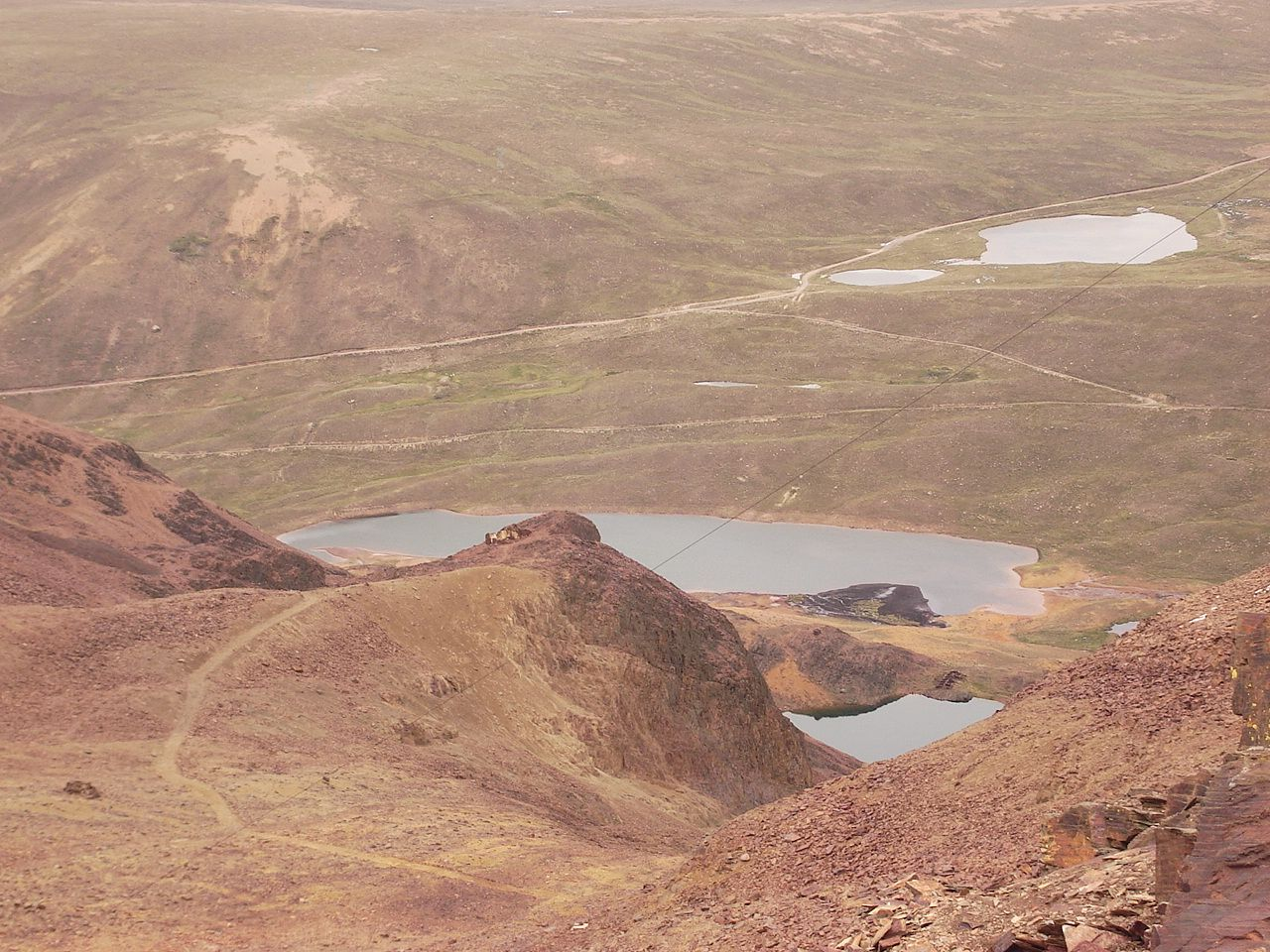
Phaq'u Quta (in the background on the right) as seen from the north

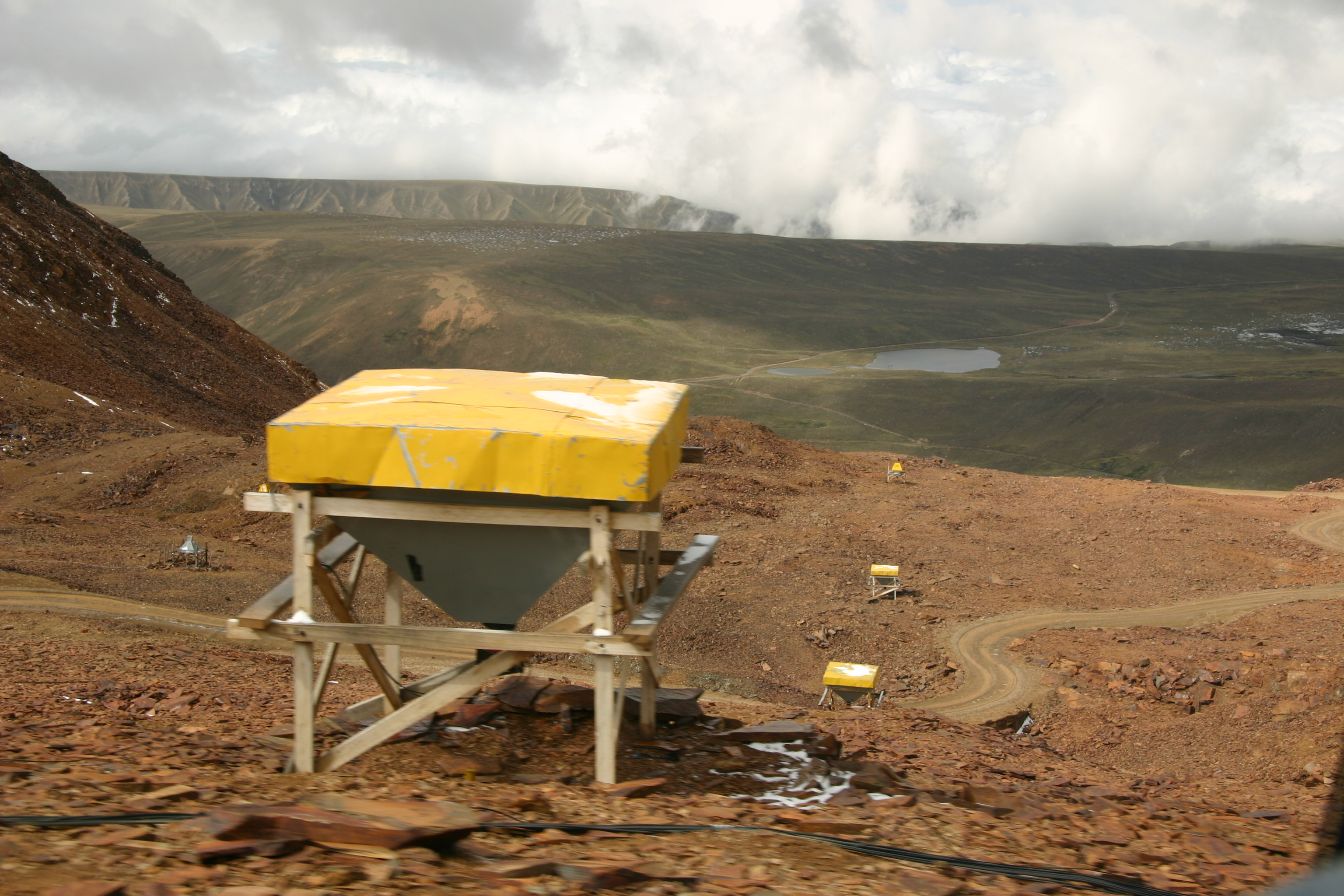
Phaq'u Quta as seen from the Chacaltaya Astrophysical Observatory

== See also ==
- Janq'u Quta (El Alto)
- Laram Quta
