= Laram Quta (El Alto) =

Lake in Bolivia

- Laguna Laram Kkota
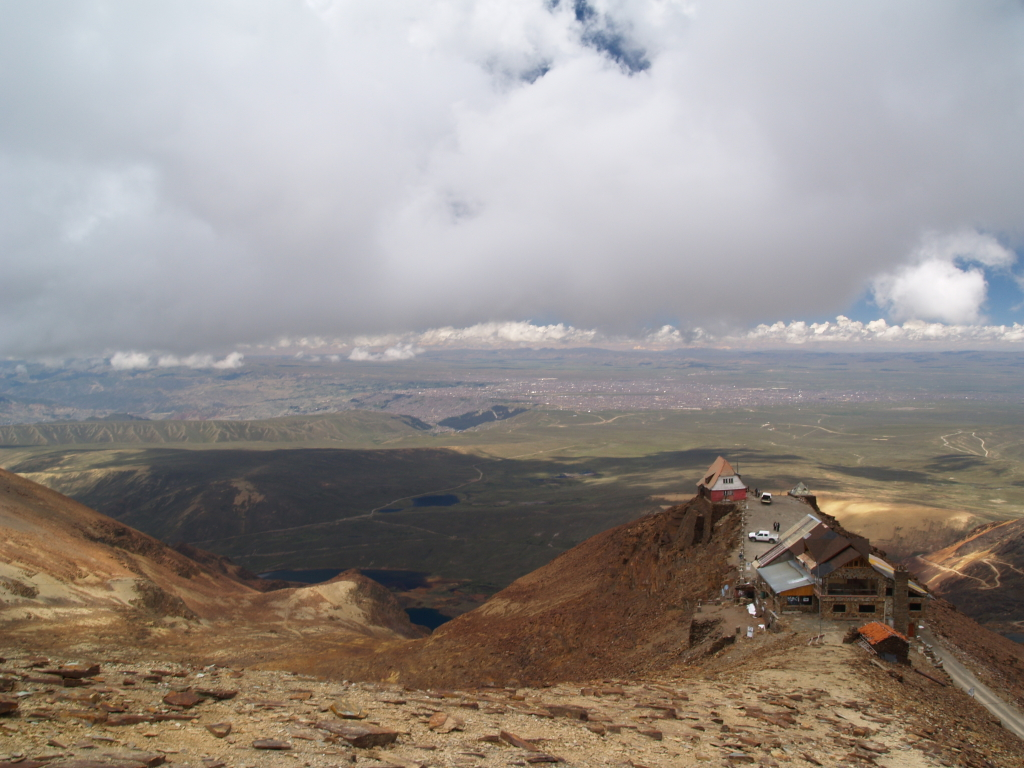
- A view of Laram Quta (the largest lake) and Phaq'u Quta (in the distance) from the top of Chacaltaya. Chacaltaya refuge is on the right.

- Location within Bolivia Location within South America
- Interactive map of Laram Quta
- Location: Bolivia, La Paz Department, Murillo Province
- Coordinates: 16°22′35″S 68°07′55″W
- Max. length: 0.5 km (0.31 mi)
- Max. width: 0.17 km (0.11 mi)
- Surface elevation: 4,556 m (14,948 ft)

Laram Quta (Aymara larama blue, quta lake, "blue lake", Hispanicized spelling Laram Kkota) is a lake in Bolivia located in the La Paz Department, Pedro Domingo Murillo Province, El Alto Municipality. It lies south of the mountain Chacaltaya, south-east of Milluni Lake, south-west of the Qillwani Lakes and north-west of Qillwani (Khelluani). Laram Quta is situated at a height of about 4,556 metres (14,948 ft), about 0,5 km long and 0,17 km at its widest point.

== Gallery ==
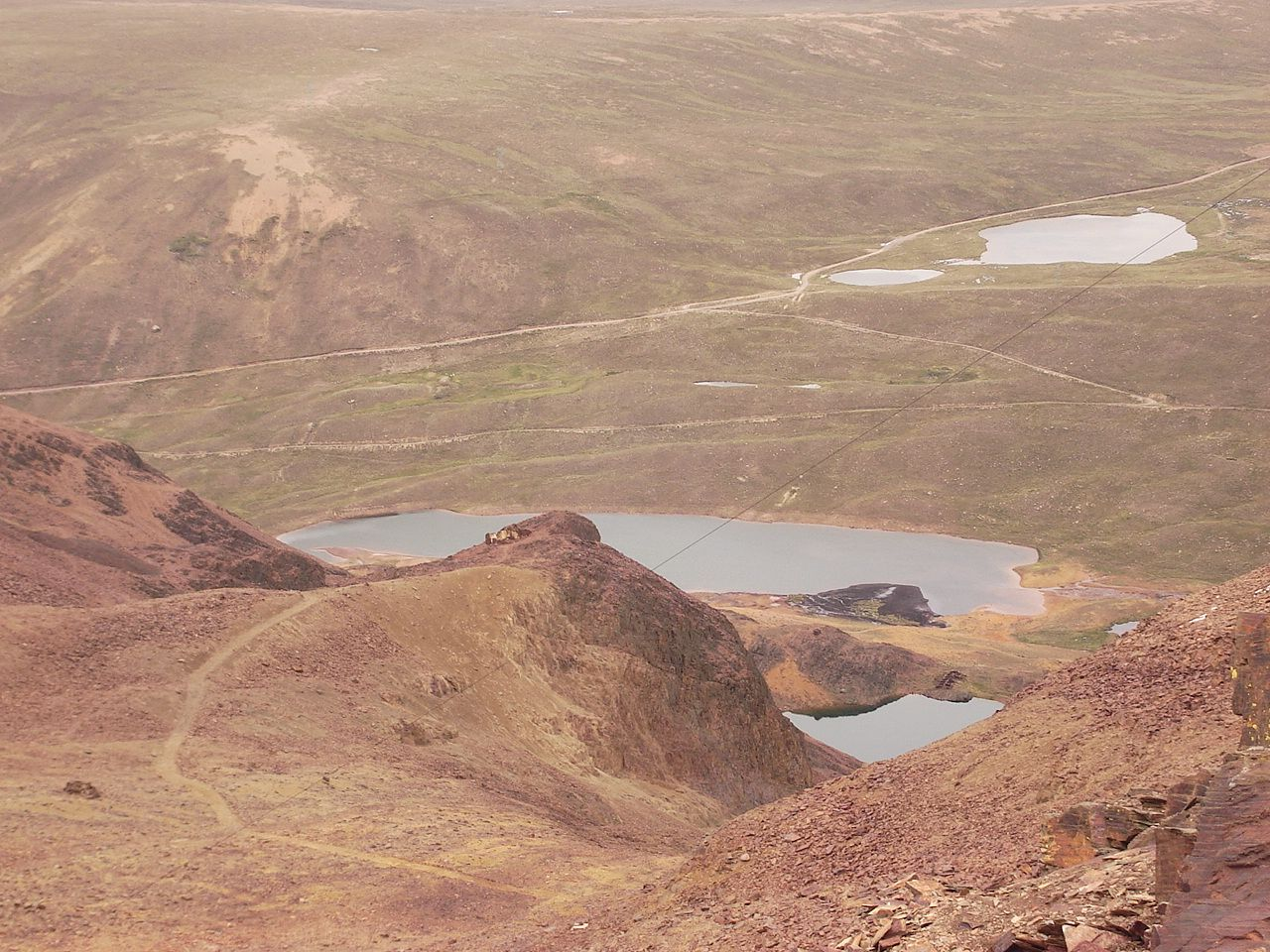
Laram Quta in the middle and Phaq'u Quta in the background as seen from the north

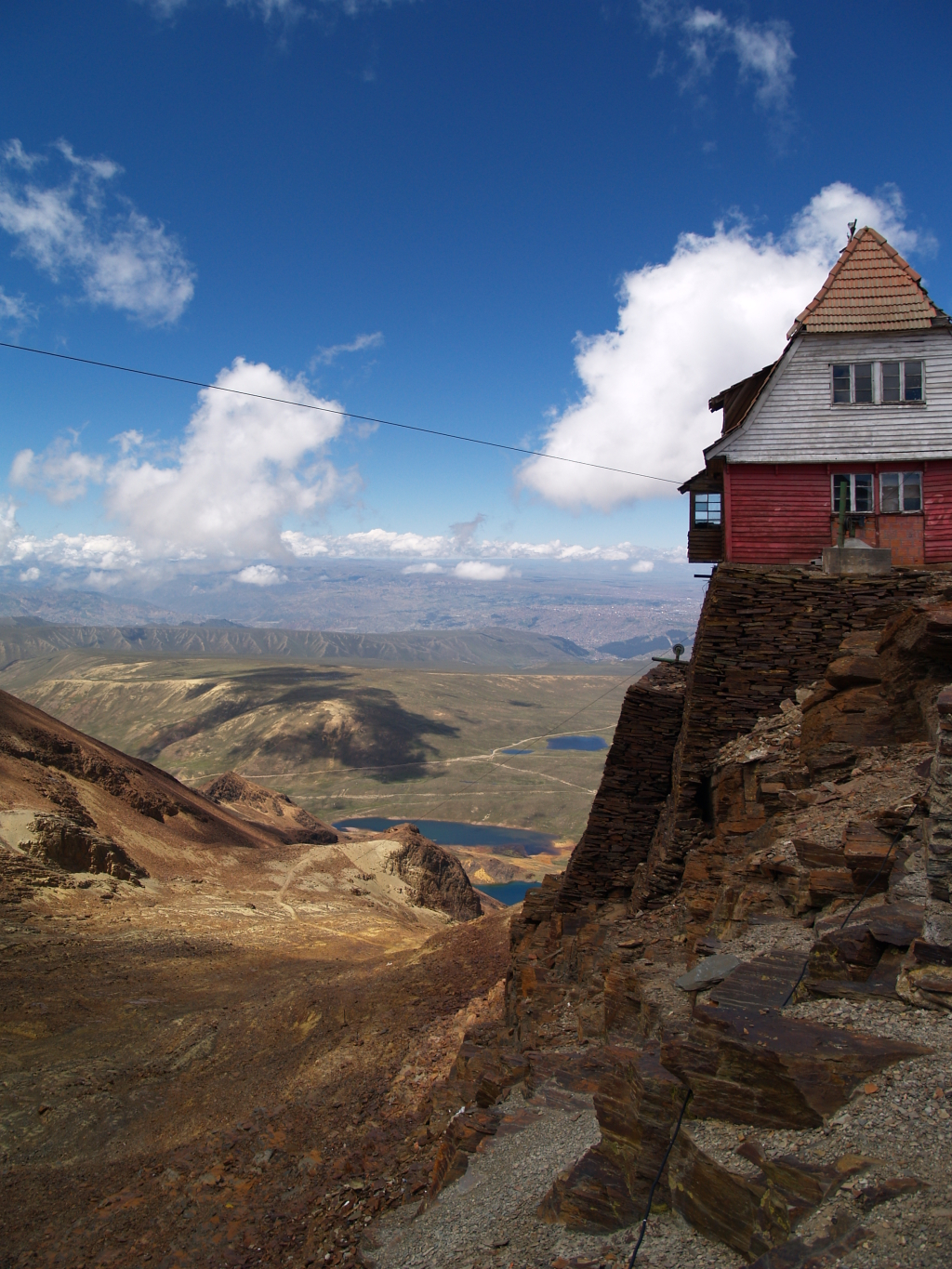
Laram Quta (the largest lake in the middle) as seen from Chacaltaya refuge

== See also ==
- Janq'u Quta (El Alto)
- Phaq'u Quta
