= Los Altos, Catamarca =

Coordinates: 28°03′S 65°28′W

Los Altos (Catamarca)
- Municipality and town
- Interactive map of Los Altos (Catamarca)
- Country: Argentina
- Province: Catamarca Province
- Time zone: UTC−3 (ART)

Los Altos (Catamarca) is a town and municipality in Catamarca Province in northwestern Argentina.
