= El Alto, Argentina =

Coordinates: 28°18′S 65°22′W

El Alto (Catamarca)
- Village municipality
- Interactive map of El Alto (Catamarca)
- Country: Argentina
- Province: Catamarca Province
- Time zone: UTC−3 (ART)

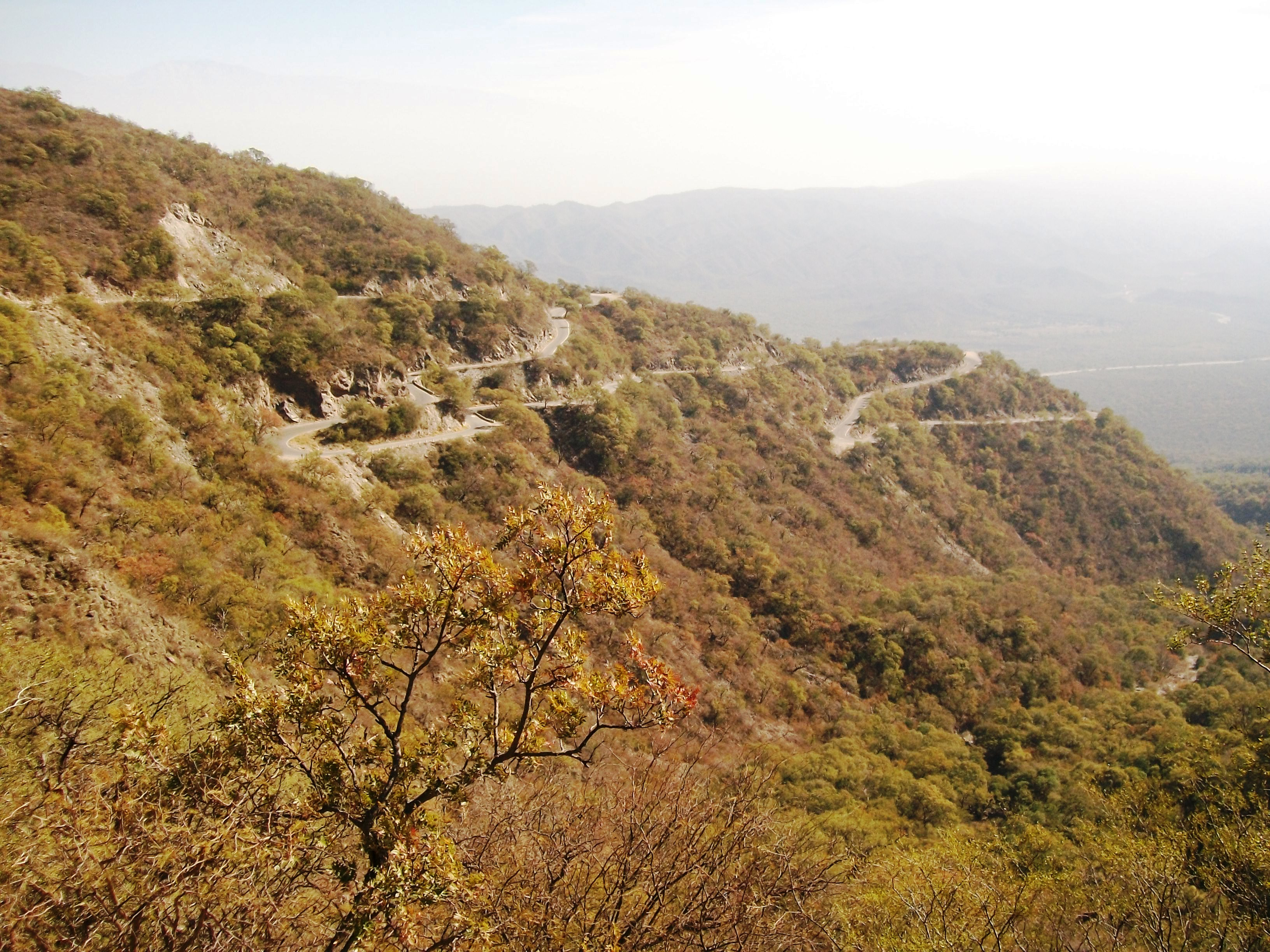
El Alto

El Alto (Catamarca) is a village municipality in El Alto Department, Catamarca Province, in northwestern Argentina.
