= Huayna Potosí =

Mountain in Bolivia

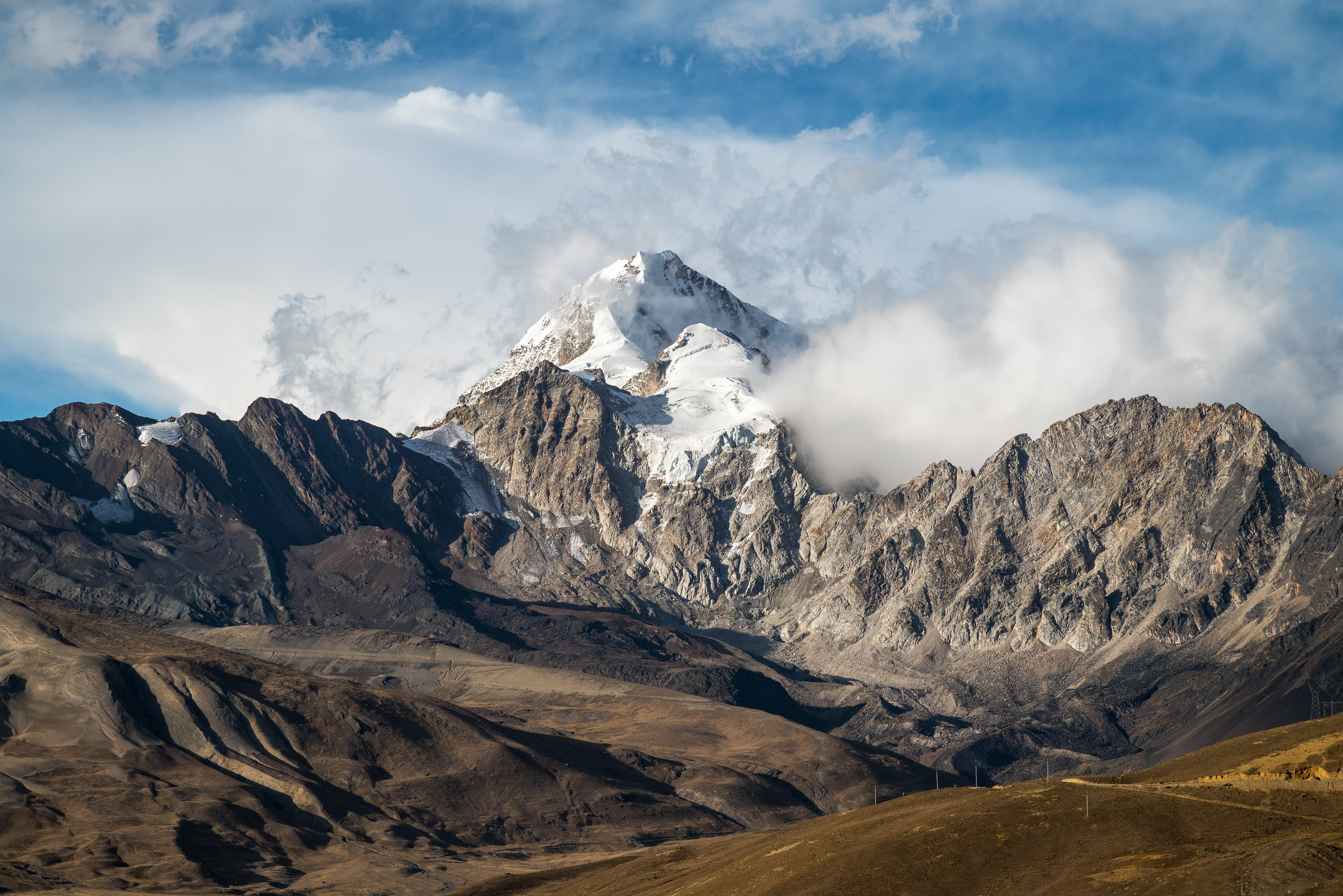
- Huayna Potosí's north slope viewed from the lower base of the mountain on 24 December 2022

Highest point
- Elevation: 6,088 m (19,974 ft)
- Prominence: 1,352 m (4,436 ft)
- Parent peak: Ancohuma
- Coordinates: 16°15′45″S 68°09′13.5″W

Naming
- Etymology: Huayna (Aymara for “young”) and Potosí
- Language of name: Aymara, Spanish

Geography
- Location within Bolivia
- Country: Bolivia
- Department: La Paz
- Parent range: Cordillera Real, Andes

Geology
- Formed by: Subduction zone
- Mountain type(s): Granite, metamorphic

Climbing
- First ascent: 1919 by Rudolf Dienst and O. Lhose
- Easiest route: rock/ice hiking and scrambling via the normal route (northwest)

Huayna Potosí is a fold mountain located in western Bolivia, near the city of El Alto and approximately 25 km (16 mi) north of La Paz, the country's administrative capital. It rises to an elevation of 6,088 m (19,974 ft) above sea level and forms part of the Cordillera Real range of the larger Andes, which runs parallel between the intermountain plains of the Altiplano and the lowland forests of the Yungas region leading to the Amazon basin.

Surrounded by high mountains, it is roughly 15 miles due north of the city, which makes this mountain the most popular climb in Bolivia. The normal ascent route is a fairly straightforward glacier climb, with some crevasses and a steep climb to the summit. However, the other side of the mountain—Huayna Potosí West Face—is the biggest face in Bolivia. Several difficult snow and ice routes ascend this 1,000-meter-high face.

The first ascent of the normal route was undertaken in 1919 by Germans Rudolf Dienst and Adolf Schulze. Some climbing books report this mountain as the "easiest 6,000er in the world", but this claim is debatable. The easiest route entails an exposed ridge and sections of moderately steep ice, with a UIAA rating of PD. There are many 6,000 m mountains that are easier to climb in terms of technical difficulty. Perhaps therefore, the main reason Huayna Potosí has been referred to as the easiest 6,000 m climb is that the elevation gain from trailhead to summit is less than 1,400 m; with easy access from La Paz. Since La Paz is at 3,640 m, climbers have an easier time acclimatizing.

== Name ==
The name Huayna Potosí is a hispanized word with Aymara origins. According to standardized Aymara, Wayna means "young" or "youth", while Potosí is a reference to the city of the same name, famous for its Cerro Rico, and an important mining site during the Spanish colonial times. Together, the word translates to "Young Potosí".

== Geographical setting ==
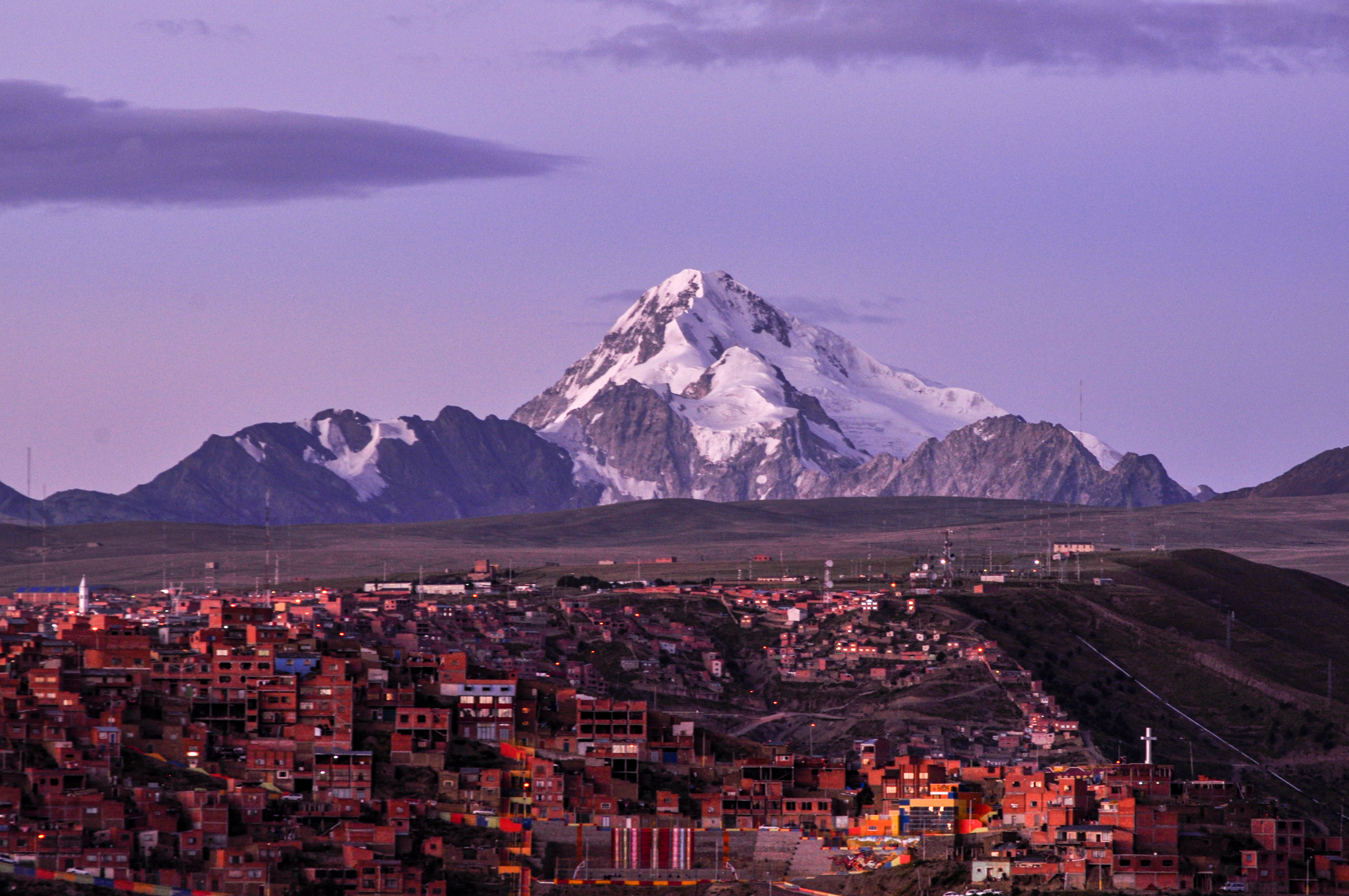
Huayna Potosi in the background viewed from the outermost neighborhoods of La Paz.

Huayna Potosí is the fifth highest peak in the Cordillera Real subrange of the Bolivian Andes, after Illimani, Ancohuma, Illampu, Layqa Qulli and Ch'iyar Juqhu. The mountain is part of a larger massif composed of multiple ridges and faces that descend into surrounding valleys. The northwestern slope of the mountain is the most frequently used climbing route as it presents moderate snow and ice gradients.

The mountain is situated 25 km (16 mi) north of La Paz, near the city of El Alto. Owing to this closeness to the metropolitan area, its glaciated summit and upper slopes are visible from many northern and northeastern parts of the city as well as from the higher elevations of El Alto, where it forms a visually distinctive backdrop to the urban landscape.

== Geology ==
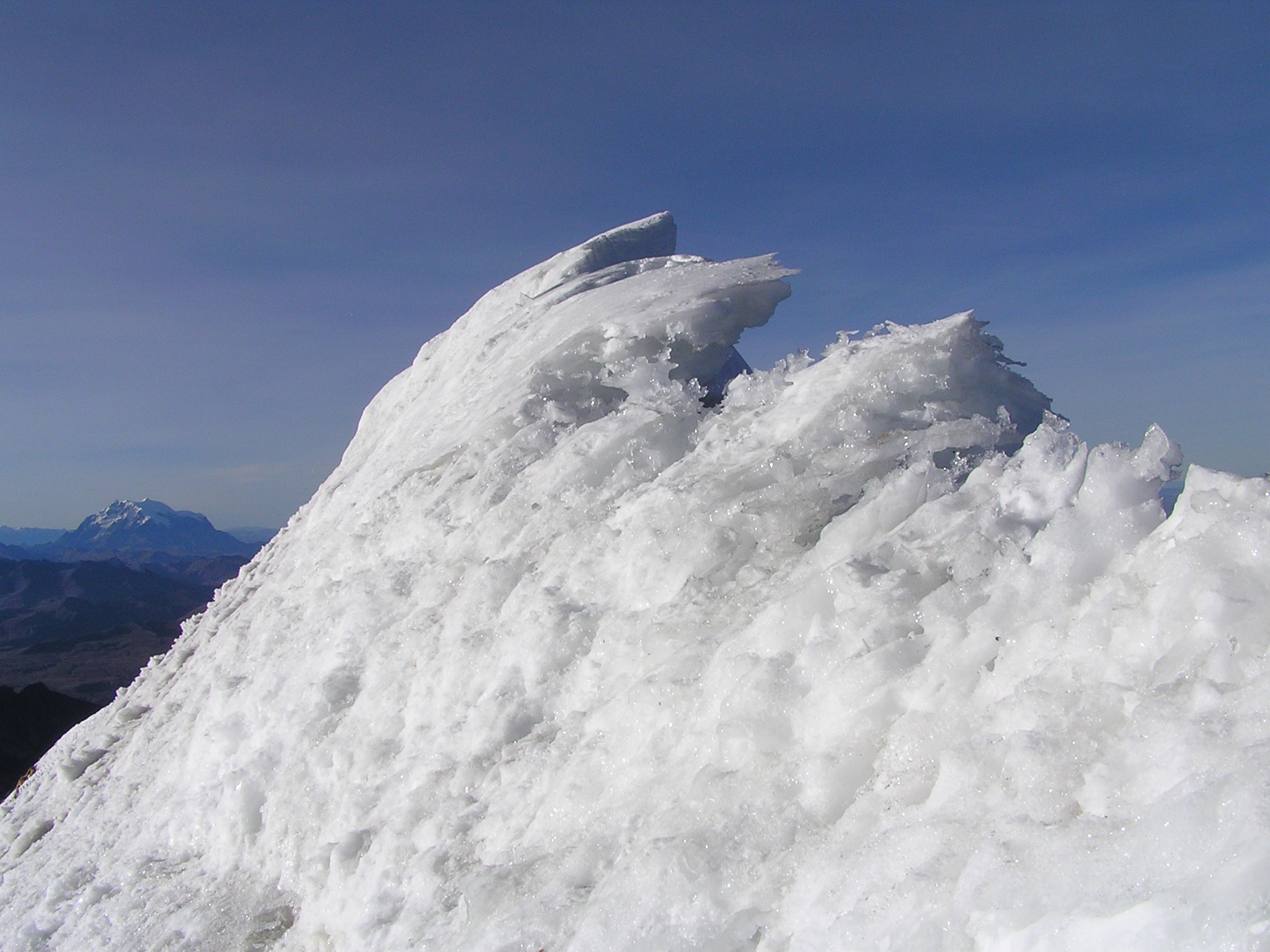
View of the summit of Huayna Potosí, with Mount Illimani visible in the distant left

Huayna Potosí is a metamorphic mountain in the Cordillera Real that consists mainly of granite and other Precambrian rocks, including schists, gneisses, and quartzites. These resistant rock types contribute to Huayna Potosí's steep slopes and sharp ridgelines, as well as its ability to support extensive glaciers at high elevations.

Like all mountains in the Cordillera Real, Huayna Potosí was formed during the Andean orogeny, the tectonic interaction between the Nazca and South American plates.

The mountain's structure is defined by a series of faults and fractures that run parallel to the cordillera, influencing the orientation of its valleys and the development of its glacial basins. Over geological time, glacial and periglacial processes have sculpted Huayna Potosí's landscape. During the Pleistocene, repeated glaciations carved deep U-shaped valleys, cirques, and morainic deposits that remain visible today around the Zongo Valley and on the eastern slopes. The modern glaciers, though retreating due to climate change, continue to play a crucial role in shaping the mountain's geomorphology and hydrology. Meltwater from these ice bodies feeds into the Katari River system, which eventually drains toward Lake Titicaca, thus linking Huayna Potosí's geology directly to the broader ecosystems of the Altiplano.

=== Glaciers ===
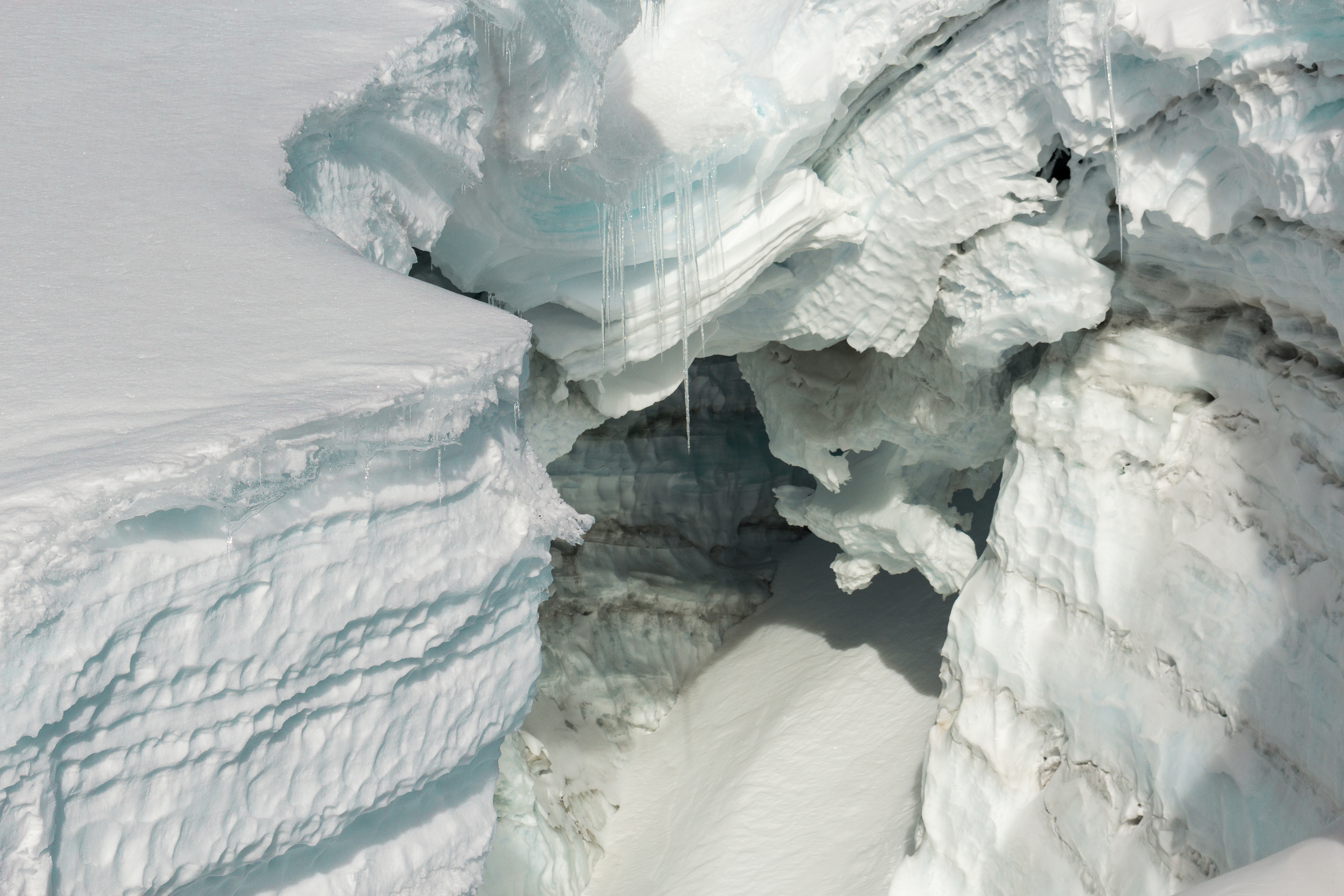
The Mina de Oro glacier

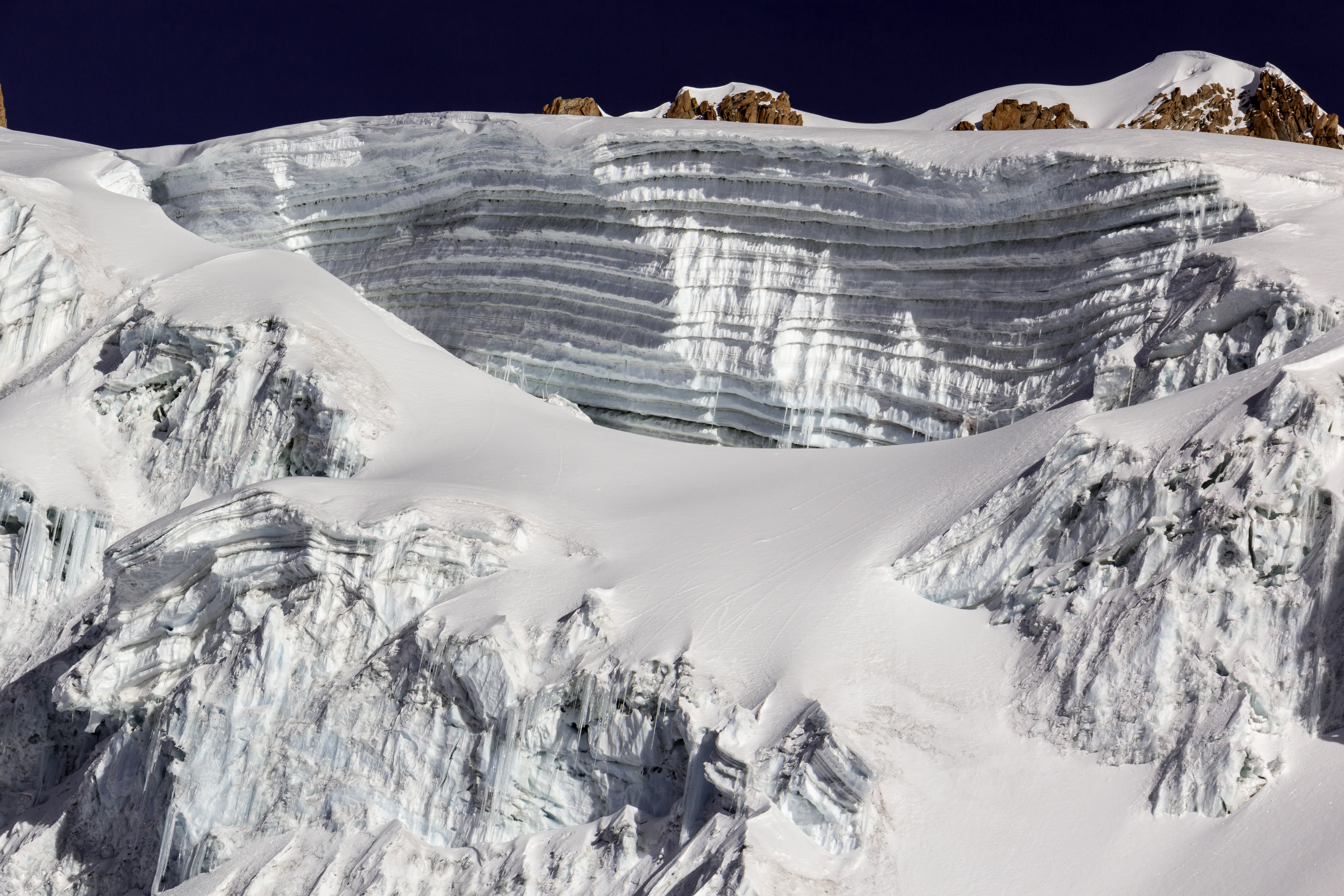
Glaciers covering the ridges of Huayna Potosí

Huayna Potosí features extensive glaciers, the largest one being the Zongo Glacier located on the western slope of the mountain and with a surface area of 2.4 km^{2} (0.93 sq mi). The glacier descends from approximately 6,000 m (20,000 ft)to 4,900 m (16,100 ft) above sea level.

Other notable glaciers include the Glaciar Mina de Oro on the northern face of the mountain and the Glaciar Italia near the southeastern ridges and close, along with several smaller ice fields and crevasses scattered across the upper ridges. These glaciers are classified as tropical mountain glaciers, sustained by a combination of high-altitude precipitation and consistently low temperatures. They play a critical role in the regional hydrological system, contributing meltwater to the Zongo River basin which supports both hydroelectric power generation and water supply for the urban areas of La Paz and El Alto.

== History ==
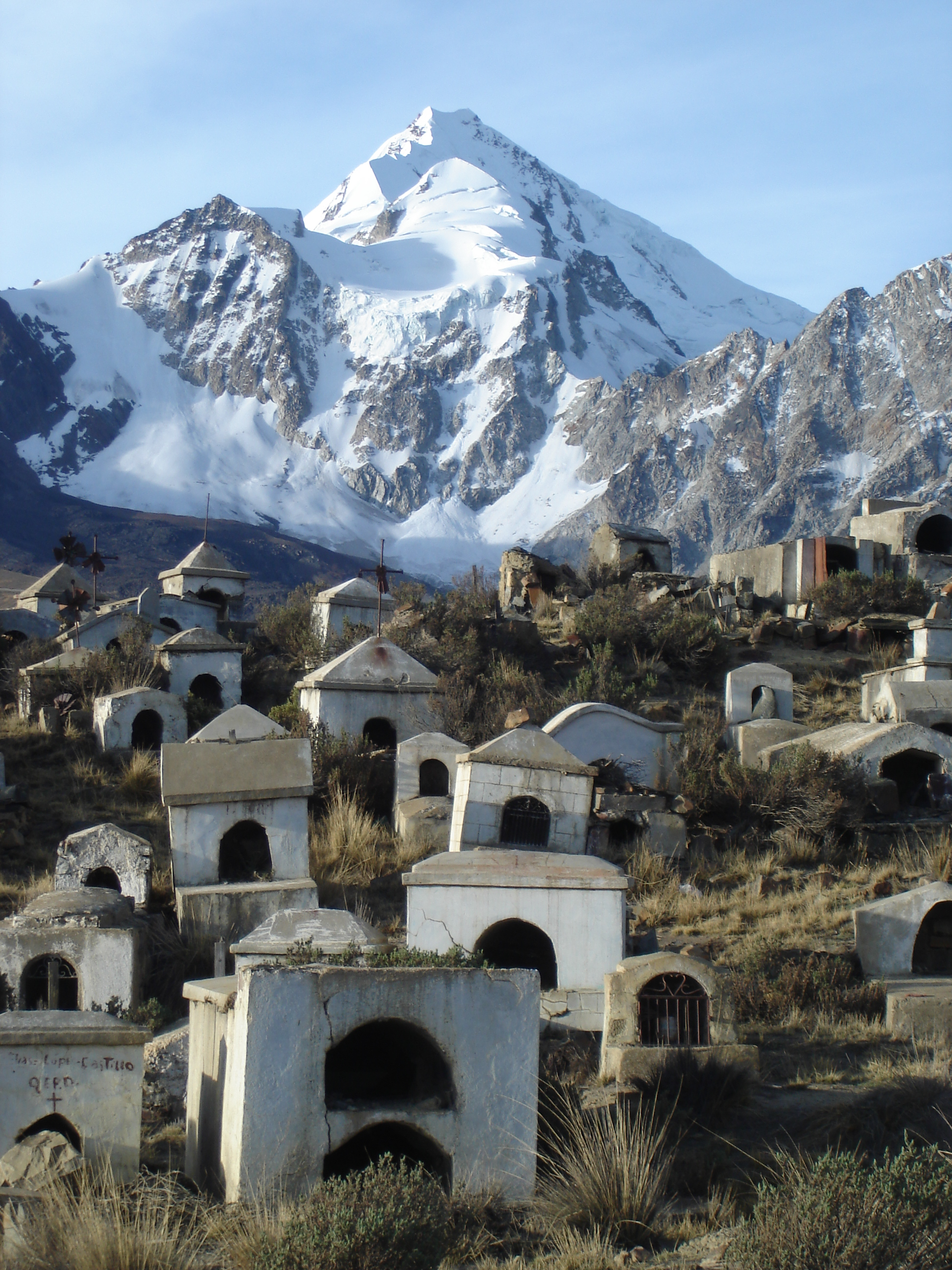
Huayna Potosí viewed from the Milluni Cemetery

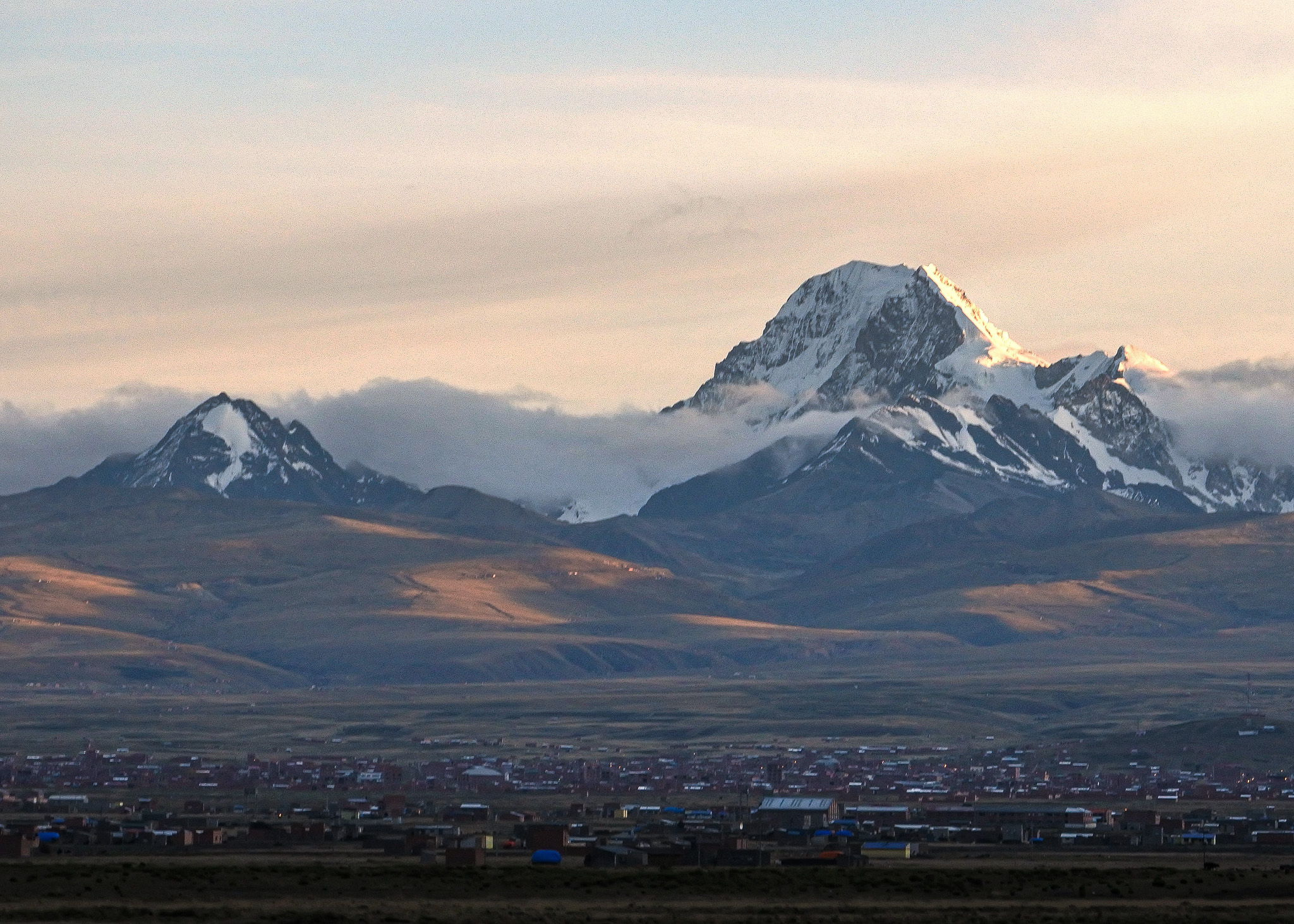
The northeastern face of Huayna Potosí towering over the outskirts of El Alto in the foreground

The history of Huayna Potosí can be traced back to indigenous traditions in Bolivia. The mountain's name derives from Quechua and Aymara origins, often interpreted as “Young Potosí”, a reference to its resemblance to Cerro Rico in Potosí, the legendary silver mountain known for its mineral wealth since colonial times. For the Aymara communities living in the surrounding highlands, Huayna Potosí has long held spiritual significance as an apu, or sacred mountain spirit, believed to watch over the region and influence weather, fertility, and water sources. These cultural associations predate European exploration and remain integral to local identity and ritual practices today.

The first recorded European attempts to climb Huayna Potosí date back to the late 19th century. In 1877, a group of six German climbers set off to climb Huayna Potosí for the first time; without proper equipment and with little practical information, their unsuccessful attempt met with tragedy. Four climbers died at an altitude around 5,600 m; the remaining two managed to retreat in deteriorating conditions, but later died by exhaustion shortly after finding their way back to the Zongo Valley. On 9 September 1898, an expedition of Austrian climbers attempted the mountain ascension but failed, after five days spent at 5,900 m (19,400 ft) when they were forced to descend due to technical and weather difficulties.

The first successful ascent was achieved a few years later, in 1919, by Rudolph Dienst and Adolf Schulze, members of a German-Austrian expedition, climbing the mountain via the east face on the route that would later become the current Normal Route, with some variants. Their climb marked a milestone in Andean mountaineering and establishing Bolivia as a destination for high-altitude exploration due to the numerous peaks suitable for climbing. In the decades that followed, Huayna Potosí became a cornerstone for both scientific expeditions and recreational climbing, with the German Alpine Club (DAV) producing some of the earliest detailed maps of the Cordillera Real.

== European climbing history of the mountain ==
In 1877 a group of six German climbers tried to climb Huayna Potosí for the first time. Without proper equipment and with little practical information, they set off toward the unclimbed peak. Their unsuccessful attempt met with tragedy. Four climbers died at an altitude around 5,600 m; the remaining two managed to retreat in deteriorating conditions, but died by exhaustion just after finding their way to the Zongo Pass. 21 years later, on 9 September 1898, an expedition of Austrian climbers attempted the mountain ascension again but after five days spent at 5,900 m they were forced to descend. Finally, in 1919 the Germans R. Dienst and O. Lhose reached the south summit (marginally higher than the north summit) climbing the mountain on the east face on a route that later would become the current normal route, with some variants.

== Normal route ==
The normal route to climb Huayna Potosí is a straightforward climb on glacier. Following this route the mountain can be climbed in two daily stages. Climbers generally take a 4×4 up the valley on a gravel road from El Alto taking about two hours to reach a car park at 4,700 m, Zongo Pass (16°17′15″S 68°07′47.6″W), where a base camp is established. There is a recently established hut here. Staff are usually happy to book walk ins if they have rooms available, and a reduced price can be negotiated outside of the peak season.

From the hut here it is a 1–3 hour hike up to the high camp at 5,200 m (16°16′32″S 68°08′16.6″W) on the snow line (Time taken depends greatly on acclimatization and fitness). This camp is called locally Campo Argentino and consists of a number of areas of leveled rocks suitable for pitching tents. As of 2006, there was a refuge at the high camp where spartan lodging was available for a fee.

Most climbers begin their summit attempt between midnight and 3 am. Fit and well acclimatized climbers rise and leave later, overtaking other groups during the climb, and can reach the summit in around 3–4 hours, but people frequently take twice that time. The route is usually clearly visible between the penitentes, and follows the main glacier up directly (across the bergschrund and directly up a ridge) or along an arête on the right. Following that it curves behind the mountain when viewed from Zongo pass. The final approach is fairly exposed, either directly to the summit, or along the summit ridge. The summit is small and frequently has a pronounced cornice, reducing usable space.

The entire climb from the high camp takes between 8 and 12 hours. Well acclimatised parties climb the mountain directly from the hut at Zongo Pass and in this case the whole climb takes most of the day.

Morning sunshine causes the snow to become less stable for walking, and increases avalanche risk from 8 am onwards. The views on a clear morning from the summit are remarkable – the mountain is far higher than anything else anywhere nearby, and the Cordillera Real, Lake Titicaca, La Paz, and part of the Altiplano they reside on are all visible. Until early 2004 there was a guest book for summiting climbers to sign. Unfortunately this overhang collapsed in mid-2006 leaving the original metal container protruding out of the summit ridge hanging above the city of La Paz below.

== Other routes ==
In addition to the normal route, a large variety of routes (some of them very technical) to the two summits exist.

- East face, French route to the south summit Difficulty AD-, opened in 1974 by Thierry Cardon and Alain Mesili
- West face, American route to the north summit. Difficulty TD, opened in 1970 by Roman Laba and John Hudson
- West face, Direct route to the north summit. Difficulty TD, opened in 1978 by F. Faure and others
- East face, Triangulo route to the south summit. Difficulty TD+, opened in 1983 by A. Mesili and others

== See also ==
- Milluni Peak
- Kunturiri
- Potosí mountain range
