= El Alto Municipality =

- Municipality
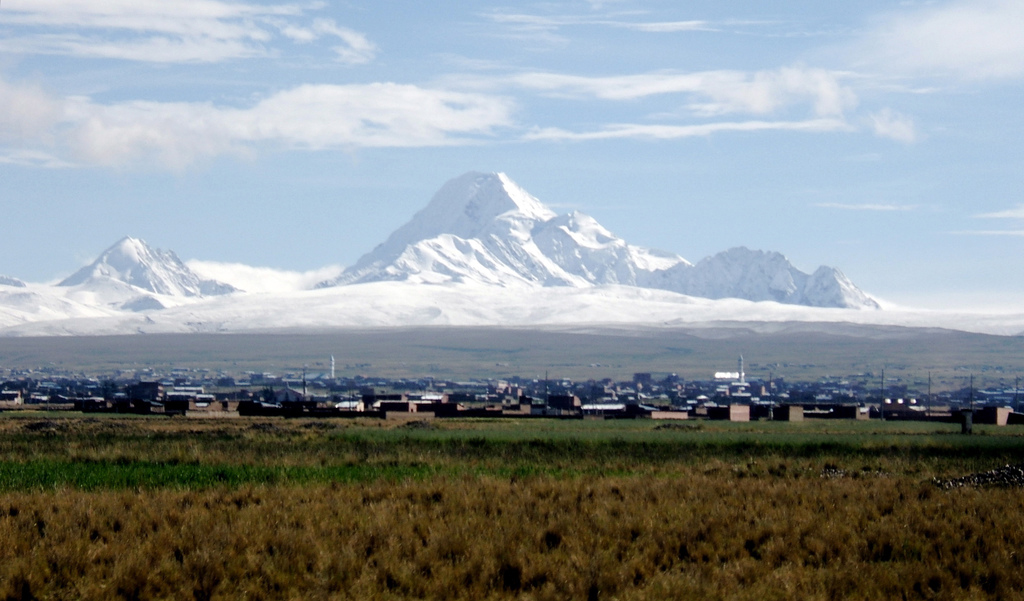
- El Alto with the Andes in the background

- Location of the El Alto Municipality within Bolivia
- Coordinates: 16°25′0″S 68°12′0″W
- Country: Bolivia
- Department: La Paz Department
- Province: Pedro Domingo Murillo Province
- Seat: El Alto

Government
  - Mayor: Fanor Nava Santiesteban (2007)
  - President: Gustavo Adolfo Morales (2007)

Area
  - Total: 134 sq mi (346 km^{2})
- Elevation: 13,000 ft (4,000 m)

Population (2024 census)
  - Total: 885,035
  - Density: 6,620/sq mi (2,560/km^{2})
- Time zone: UTC-4 (BOT)

El Alto Municipality or El Alto de La Paz Municipality is a municipal section of the Pedro Domingo Murillo Province in the La Paz Department, Bolivia. Its seat is El Alto, the second-largest city in Bolivia.

== See also ==
- Janq'u Quta
- Laram Quta
- Milluni Lake
- Phaq'u Quta
