= El Alto Department =

Department in Argentina

El Alto Departamento El Alto
- Department
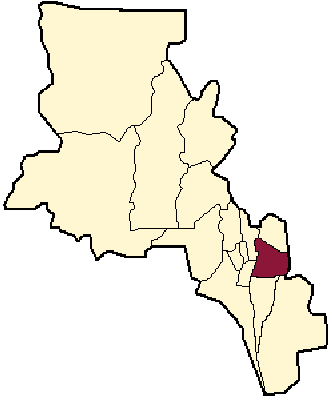
- location of El Alto Department in Catamarca Province
- Coordinates: 28°18′S 65°22′W
- Country: Argentina
- Established: ?
- Founder: ?
- Seat: El Alto

Government
  - Mayor: Moisés Bulacio, Frente Justicialista

Area
  - Total: 2,327 km^{2} (898 sq mi)

Population (2001 census [INDEC])
  - Total: 3,400
  - Density: 1.5/km^{2} (3.8/sq mi)
- Demonym: ?
- Postal Code: K4235
- IFAM: CAT008
- Area Code: 03833
- Patron saint: ?
- Website: web.archive.org/web/20061214085930/http://www.camsencat.gov.ar/elalto.html

El Alto is an eastern department of Catamarca Province in Argentina.

The provincial subdivision has a population of about 3,400 inhabitants in an area of 2,327 km^{2} (898 sq mi), and its capital city is El Alto.
