= Zongo River =

- Etymology: Aymara

Location
- Country: Bolivia
- Region: La Paz Department

The Zongo River (Aymara sunku one-armed) is a river in the La Paz Department of Bolivia.

The Rio Zongo begins approximate east of the Huayna Potosí mountain and runs 15 km northwards before turning to the northeast. It feeds into the Coroico River near alcoche village, ca. 15 km north-west from Caranavi.

There are several large hydroelectric power plants at the Rio Zongo, mainly for the power supply of La Paz. The first power plant went into service in Botijlaca in 1938.

== See also ==
- List of rivers of Bolivia
