= Chacaltaya =

Mountain in Bolivia

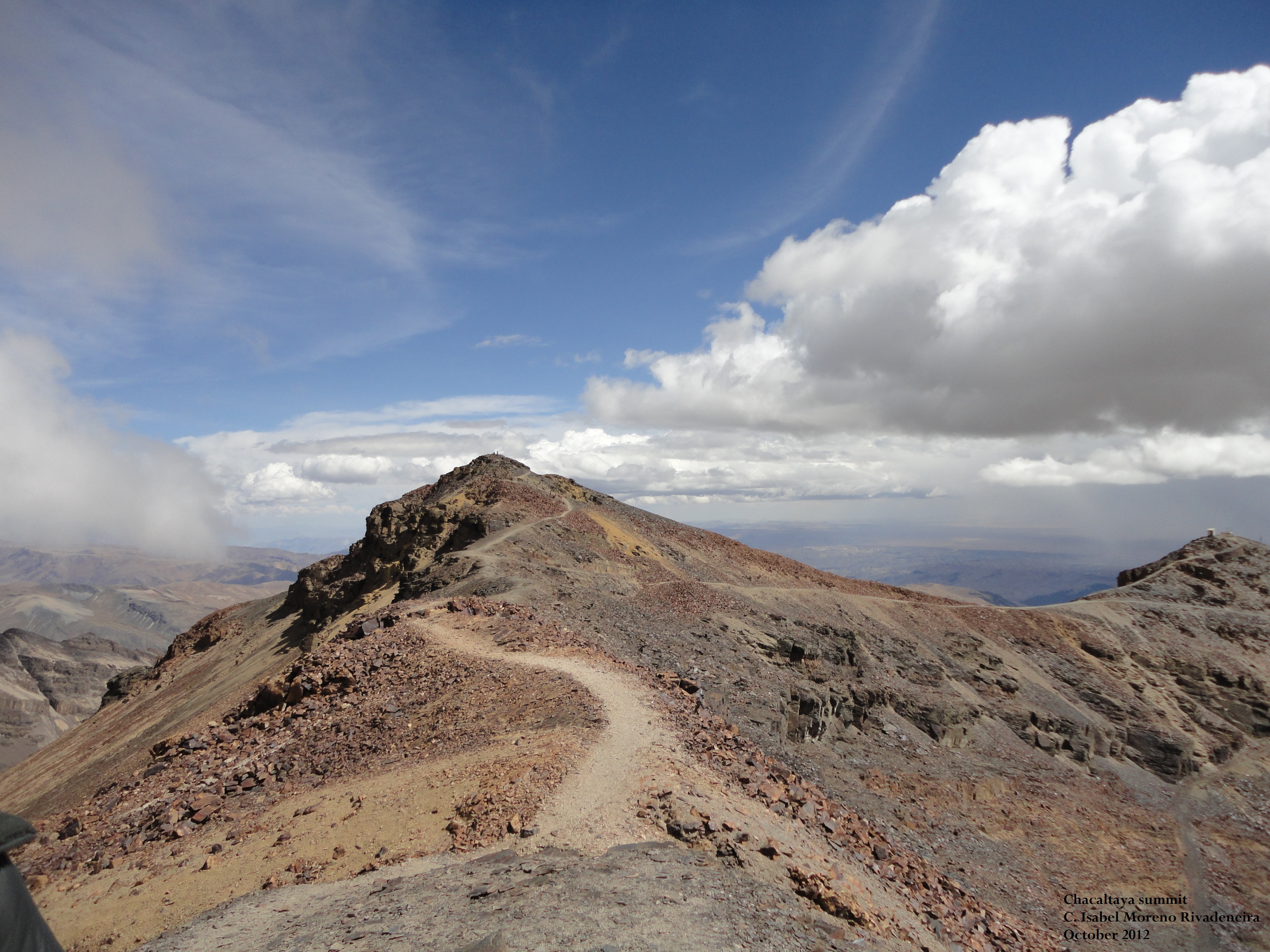
- Chacaltaya peak, October 2012

Highest point
- Elevation: 5,395 m (17,700 ft)
- Prominence: 658 m (2,159 ft)
- Coordinates: 16°21′12″S 68°07′53″W

Geography
- Location within Bolivia
- Location: La Paz Department, Bolivia
- Parent range: Cordillera Real, Andes

Geology
- Mountain type: Fold mountain

Climbing
- Easiest route: Walk up

Chacaltaya (Mollo language for "bridge of winds" or "winds meeting point", Aymara for "cold road") is a mountain in the Cordillera Real, one of the mountain ranges of the Cordillera Oriental, itself a range of the Bolivian Andes. Its elevation is 5,395 meters (17,700 ft). Chacaltaya's glacier — which was as old as 18,000 years — had an area of 0.22 km^{2} (0.085 sq mi) in 1940, which had been reduced to 0.01 km^{2} (0.0039 sq mi) in 2007 and was completely gone by 2009. Half of the meltdown, as measured by volume, took place before 1980. The final meltdown after 1980, due to missing precipitation and the warm phase of El Niño, resulted in the glacier's disappearance in 2009. The glacier was located about 30 kilometers (19 mi) from La Paz, near Huayna Potosí mountain.

== Ski area ==
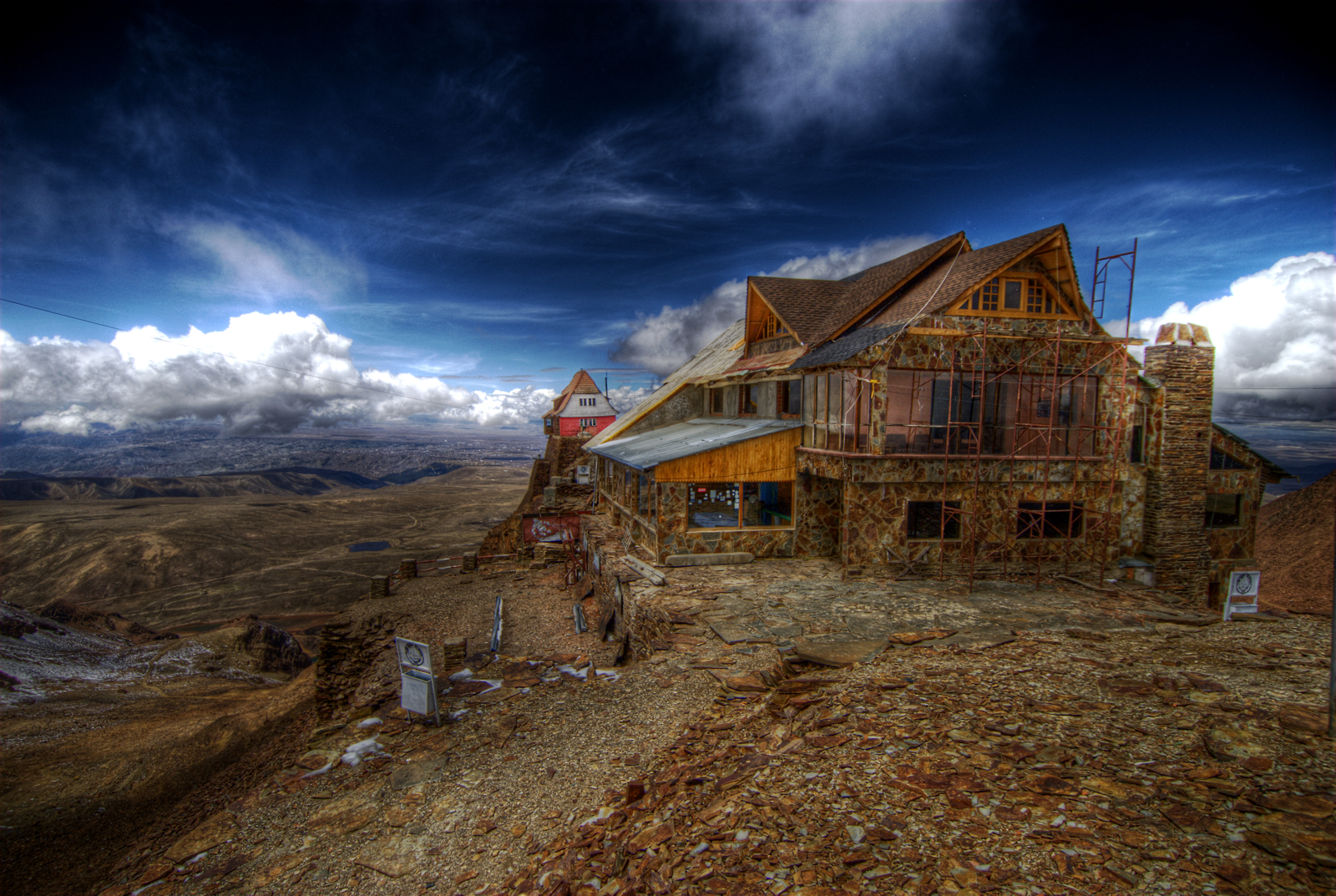
Enhanced image of Chacaltaya ski resort, November 2007

The glacier on Chacaltaya served as Bolivia's only ski resort. It was the world's highest lift-served ski area and the northernmost in South America.

The rope tow, the first in South America, was built in 1939 using an automobile engine; it was housed in the site's original clapboard lodge, and is now inoperable. The road to the base of the 200-meter (660 ft) drop is reached by a narrow road, also built in the 1930s. Traditionally, due to the extreme cold weather, the lift operated exclusively on weekends from November to March. Since 2009, skiing is restricted to a 600-foot (180 m) stretch that sometimes receives sufficient snowfall for a run during the winter. The mountain is also popular with amateur mountaineers, as the road stops only 200 metres (660 ft) from the summit. Guinness World Records considers the ski resort restaurant to be the highest restaurant in the world.

== Retreat of Chacaltaya glacier ==
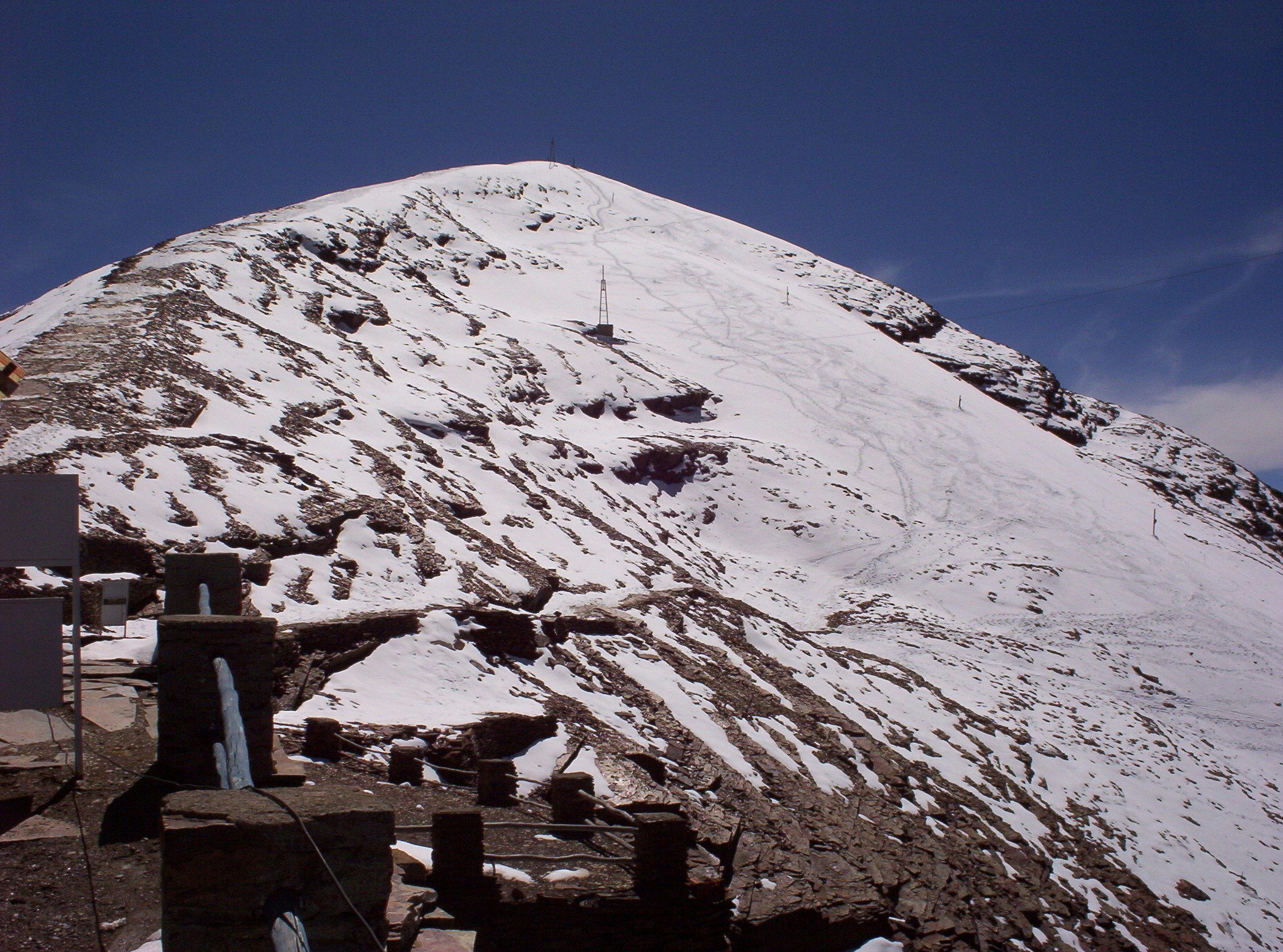
View of Chacaltaya glacier, May 2005

Scientists at the Mount Chacaltaya Laboratory started measuring the Chacaltaya glacier in the 1990s. Predicted at that time to survive until 2015, the glacier melted at a faster rate than expected. By 2009, it had been reduced to a few small patches of ice and snow near the top of the mountain.

Many Bolivians on the Altiplano and in two of Bolivia's main cities — La Paz and El Alto — depend on melt water from Andean glaciers for part of their water supply during the dry season. The World Bank has warned that many glaciers in the tropical portion of the Andes are expected to disappear within 20 years. This will threaten the water supplies of nearly 80 million people as well as the future generation of hydropower. Bolivia, Ecuador, and Peru depend on hydropower for about half their electricity.

== Observatory ==
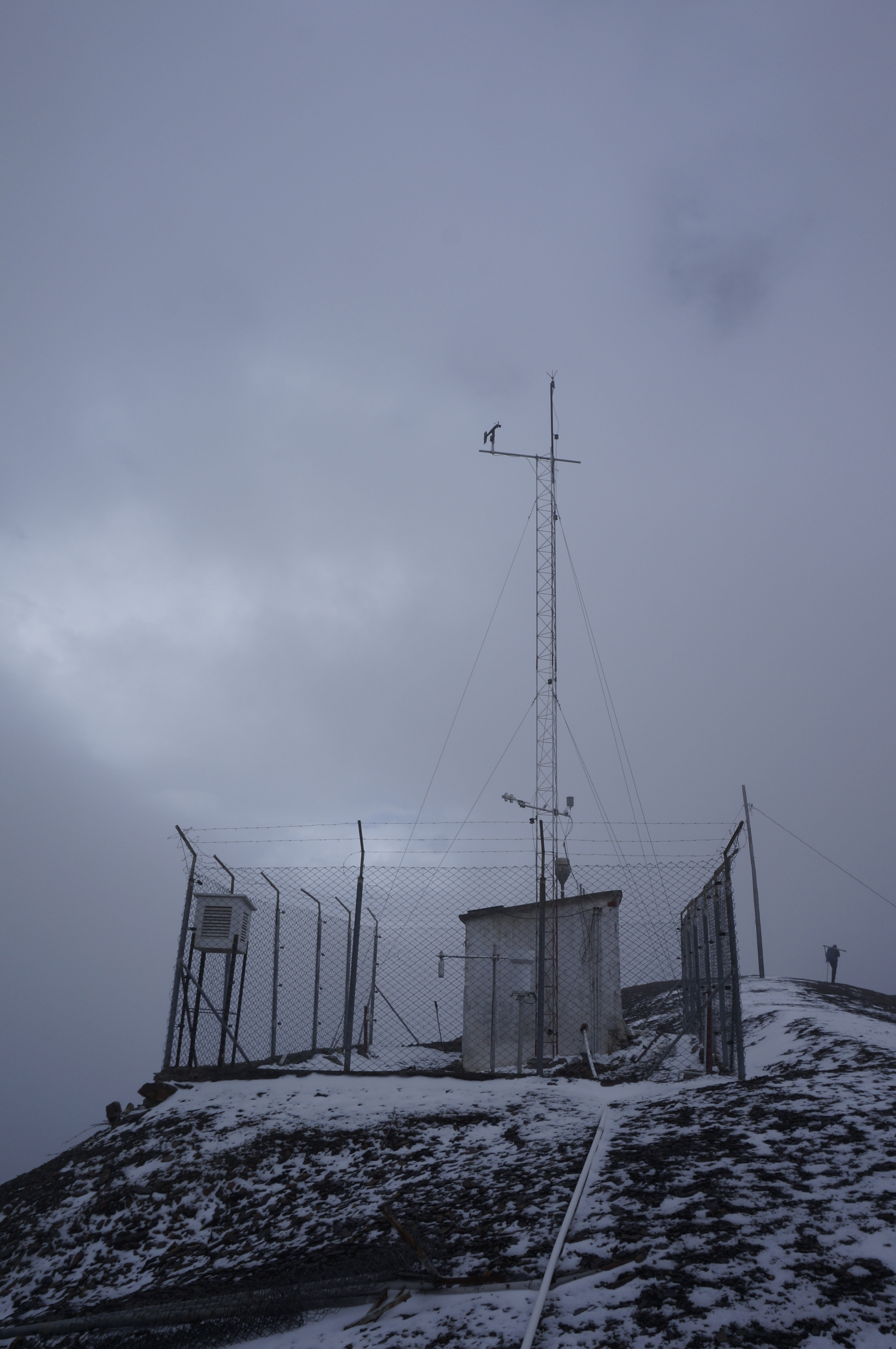
The automatic weather station located in the northwestern ridge of Mount Chacaltaya, Bolivia. It is one of the highest in the country, located at 5380 m above sea level. Until 1952 the station belonged to the Bolivia's National Meteorological Service but since that date it belongs to the Universidad Mayor de San Andrés.

Located at 5,240 meters (17,190 ft), the Mount Chacaltaya Laboratory began as a weather station in 1942. It is an important site for gamma ray research and was the site in the 1940s of the first observations of pions.

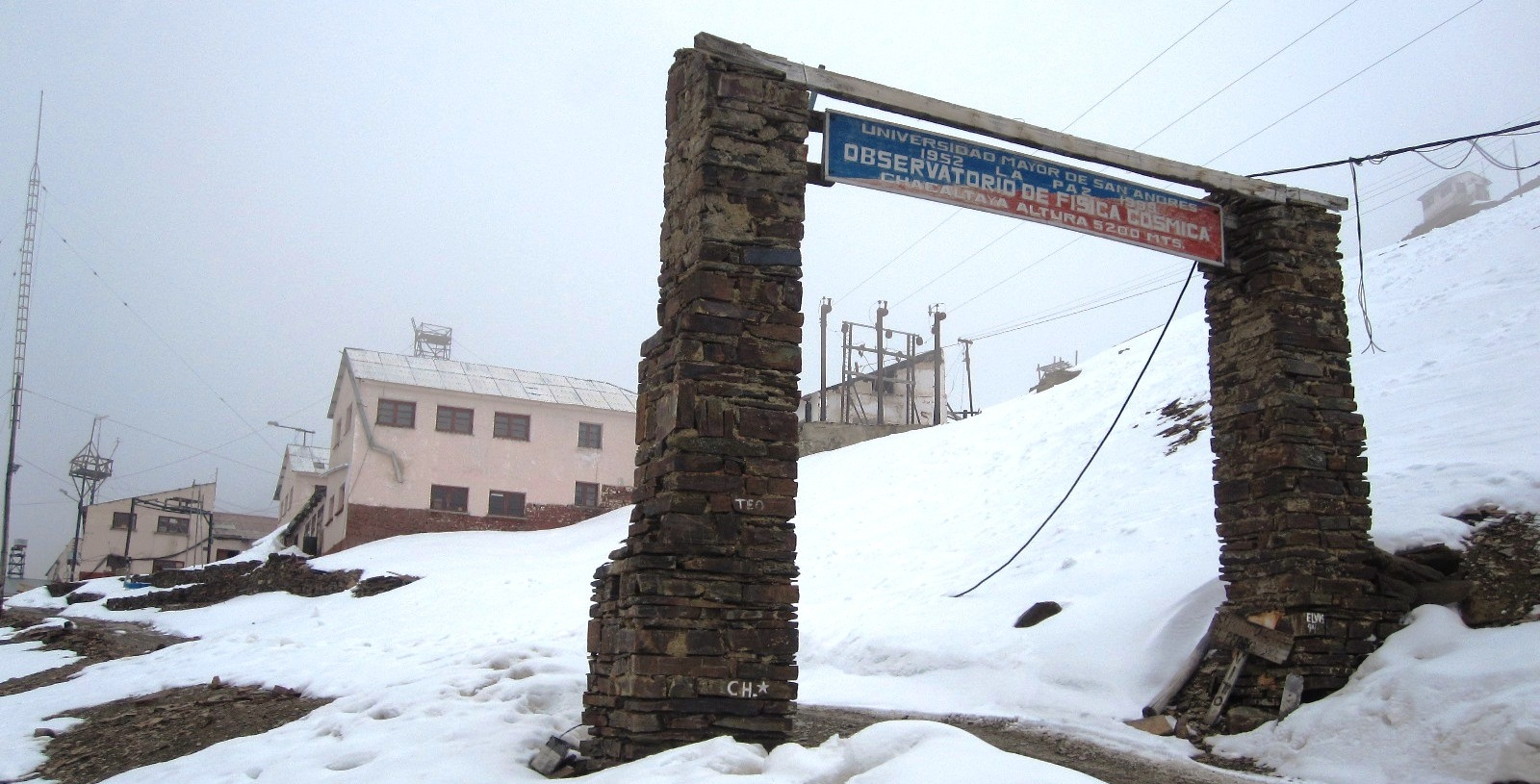
Chacaltaya Observatory, March 2011

The Chacaltaya (Astrophysical) Observatory belongs to the Universidad Mayor de San Andrés and it is operated in collaboration with other universities worldwide. It hosts a cosmic ray research group, and since 2011 the Chacaltaya Global Atmosphere Watch (GAW) station. The GAW station is one of the few monitoring sites of Essential Climate Variables (meteorological variables, aerosols, and greenhouse gases) in the Southern Hemisphere.

== Climate ==
Climate data for Chacaltaya, elevation 5,188 m (17,021 ft)
Month	Jan	Feb	Mar	Apr	May	Jun	Jul	Aug	Sep	Oct	Nov	Dec	Year
Record high °C (°F)	8.0 (46.4)	10.5 (50.9)	12.0 (53.6)	8.3 (46.9)	8.5 (47.3)	7.7 (45.9)	6.5 (43.7)	9.7 (49.5)	6.9 (44.4)	11.0 (51.8)	10.1 (50.2)	10.0 (50.0)	12.0 (53.6)
Mean daily maximum °C (°F)	3.8 (38.8)	3.1 (37.6)	4.0 (39.2)	3.6 (38.5)	3.2 (37.8)	2.7 (36.9)	2.3 (36.1)	3.4 (38.1)	4.1 (39.4)	5.7 (42.3)	5.1 (41.2)	4.7 (40.5)	3.8 (38.9)
Daily mean °C (°F)	0.3 (32.5)	−0.2 (31.6)	0.2 (32.4)	−0.1 (31.8)	−0.9 (30.4)	−1.5 (29.3)	−2.7 (27.1)	−1.1 (30.0)	−0.4 (31.3)	0.9 (33.6)	1.0 (33.8)	0.8 (33.4)	−0.3 (31.4)
Mean daily minimum °C (°F)	−3.8 (25.2)	−4.0 (24.8)	−3.9 (25.0)	−3.8 (25.2)	−5.2 (22.6)	−5.8 (21.6)	−7.7 (18.1)	−5.6 (21.9)	−5.5 (22.1)	−4.3 (24.3)	−3.8 (25.2)	−3.8 (25.2)	−4.8 (23.4)
Record low °C (°F)	−13.7 (7.3)	−12.5 (9.5)	−15.0 (5.0)	−8.7 (16.3)	−13.4 (7.9)	−13.8 (7.2)	−12.9 (8.8)	−13.5 (7.7)	−15.9 (3.4)	−13.6 (7.5)	−12.6 (9.3)	−11.6 (11.1)	−15.9 (3.4)
Average precipitation mm (inches)	81.1 (3.19)	80.7 (3.18)	68.2 (2.69)	33.9 (1.33)	22.7 (0.89)	4.6 (0.18)	3.4 (0.13)	9.7 (0.38)	38.3 (1.51)	29.5 (1.16)	38.7 (1.52)	65.0 (2.56)	475.8 (18.72)
Average precipitation days	14.7	13.6	10.3	5.6	3.4	0.9	1.3	3.0	7.7	7.5	8.1	11.1	87.2
Average relative humidity (%)	84.5	86.7	83.7	79.0	76.0	68.0	69.1	67.8	72.4	75.6	78.6	78.4	76.6
Source 1: Servicio Nacional de Meteorología e Hidrología de Bolivia
Source 2:

== See also ==
- List of highest astronomical observatories
- Retreat of glaciers since 1850
