= Chakana =

Andean symbol

Most commonly used variation of an Andean cross used today; this open Andean cross can also be seen at the Tello Obelisk and on Tiwanaku Qirus, often with an eye inside.

The chakana or Andean cross (also "stepped cross", "step motif", or "stepped motif") is a stepped cross motif used by the Inca and pre-Incan Andean societies. The most commonly used variation of this symbol today is made up of an equal-armed cross indicating the cardinal points of the compass and a superimposed square. Chakana means 'bridge' or 'to cross over' in Quechua. The symbol has a cultural tradition spanning 4,000 years up to the Inca Empire. The motif appears in pre-contact artifacts such as textiles and ceramics from such cultures as the Chavín, Wari, Chancay, Cañari, and Tiwanaku, but with no particular emphasis and no key or guide to a means of interpretation. The anthropologist Alan Kolata calls the Andean cross "one of the most ubiquitous, if least understood elements in Tiwanaku iconography".

== Andean cross with central eye motif ==
Ancient Tiwanaku Qirus sometimes bear Andean crosses with central eye motifs. The central eye sometimes is vertically divided. The anthropologist Scott C. Smith interprets the Andean cross motif as a top view of a platform mound (like the Akapana or Pumapunku). According to anthropologist Robin Beck, the cross motif in Yaya-Mama stone carving may have been a precursor of the Tiwanaku Andean cross. Beck suggests that the Tiwanaku Andean cross is a representation of a "platform-chamber complex".

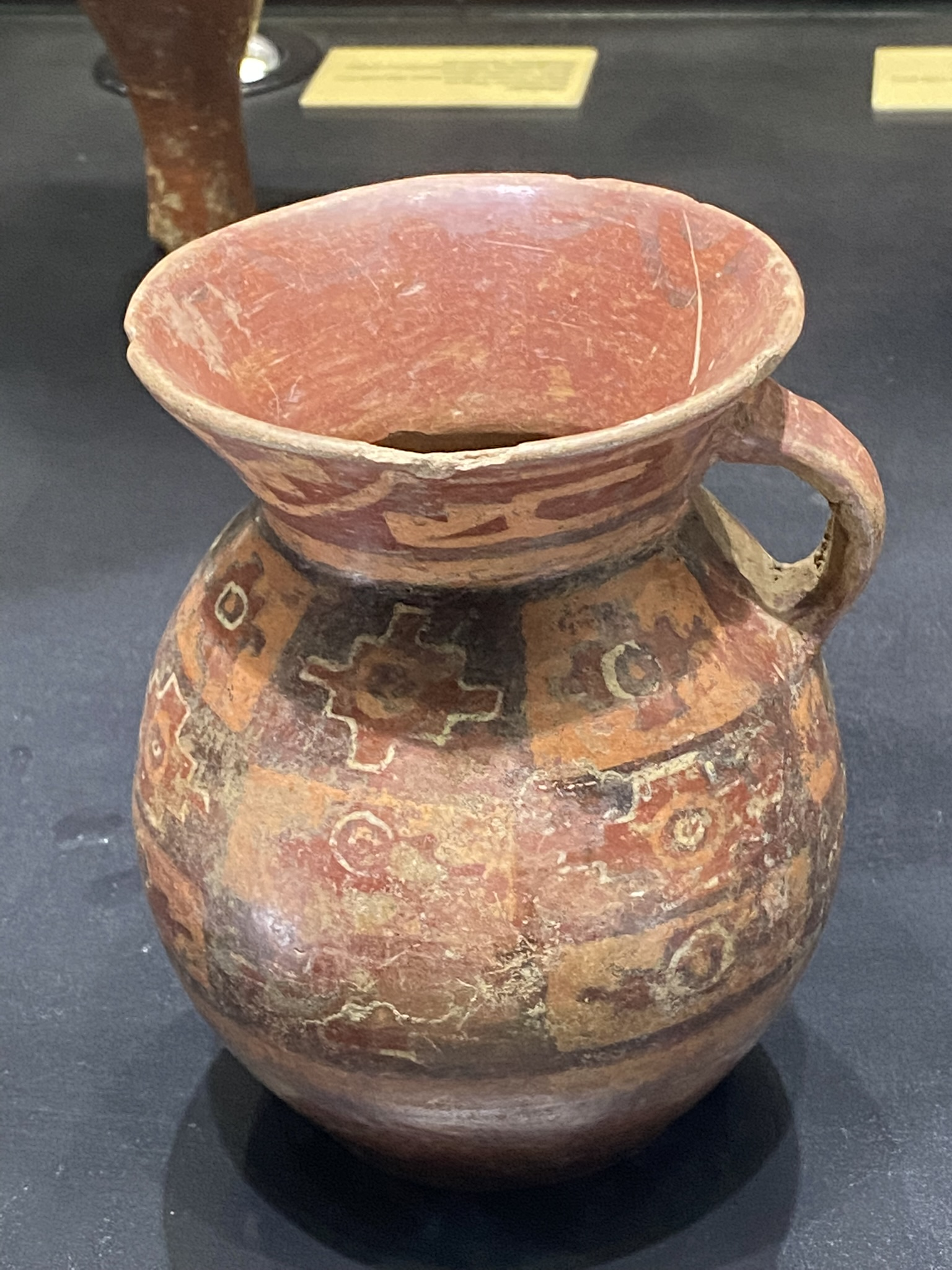
Andean cross with central eye motif on a Tiwanaku Qiru

Modern Andean cross with central eye motif replicated in the coat of arms of Puno (Peru)

== Historical evidence ==
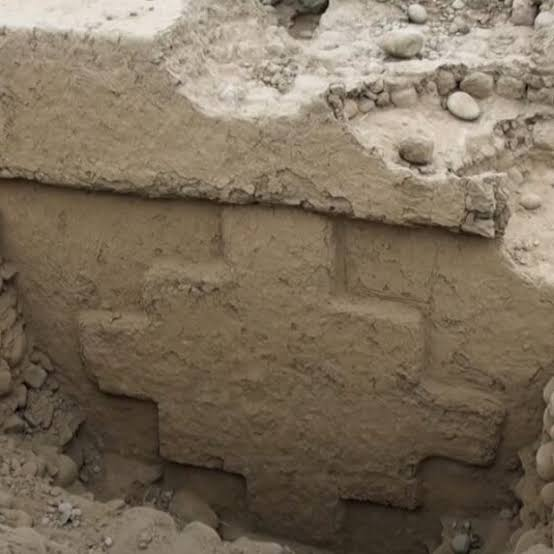
Approximately 4,000-year-old Chakana

The Andean cross (Chakana) is one of the oldest symbols in the Andes. The oldest complete Chakana was found at an approximately 4,000-year-old temple complex in Huaral by a team of archaeologists led by archaeologist Pieter Van Dalen. It appears as a prominent element of the decoration of the Tello Obelisk, a decorated monolithic pillar discovered by Peruvian archaeologist Julio C. Tello at the Chavín culture site of Chavín de Huántar. Construction of Chavín de Huántar began around 1200 BCE and the site continued in use to about 400 BCE. The exact date of the Tello Obelisk is not known, but based on its style it probably dates to the middle of this range, around 800 BCE. The form of the Andean cross may be replicated in the Akapana, a large terraced platform mound with a central reservoir built at the site of Tiahuanaco by people of the Tiwanaku culture near Lake Titicaca, Bolivia, and dating to about AD 400. Tiwanaku was the center of the Tiwanaku Empire, which thrived in the southern Andes from about 400 to 1000 CE.

The mestizo historian Garcilaso de la Vega, el Ynga, reports about a holy cross of white and red marble or jasper, which was venerated in 16th-century Cusco.

The Incas began to venerate the holy cross after they heard how Pedro de Candia had miraculously defied a lion and a tiger holding a cross. When the Spaniards captured the city, they transferred the cross to the sacristy of the newly built cathedral, where de la Vega saw it in 1560. He was surprised that the clergy had not decorated it with gold or gems. Ongoing stories about indigenous crosses contributed to the idea of a 'natural' religion that would have prepared the Indians for their inevitable conversion to Christianity.

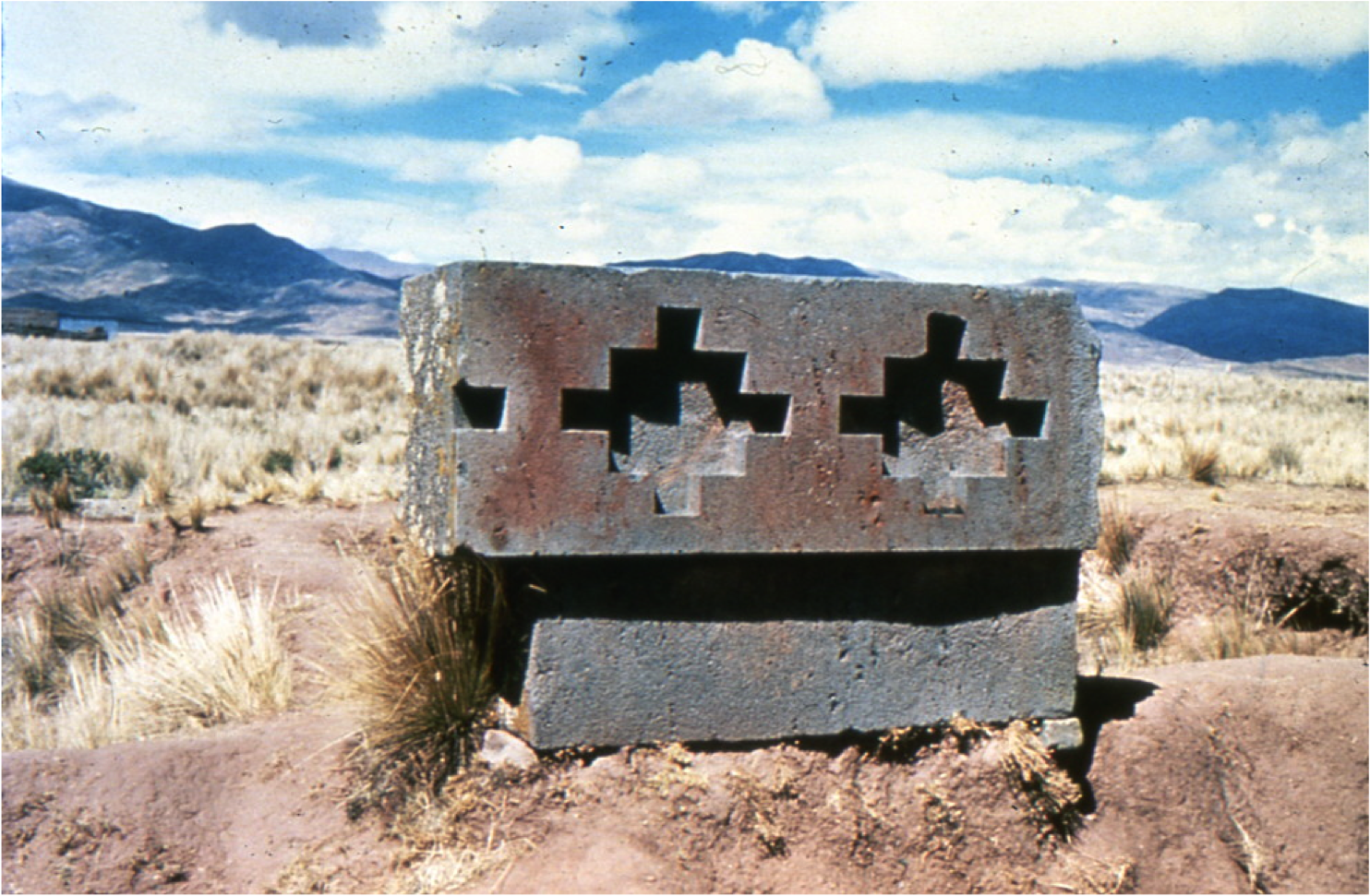
"Andean cross" at Tiwanaku

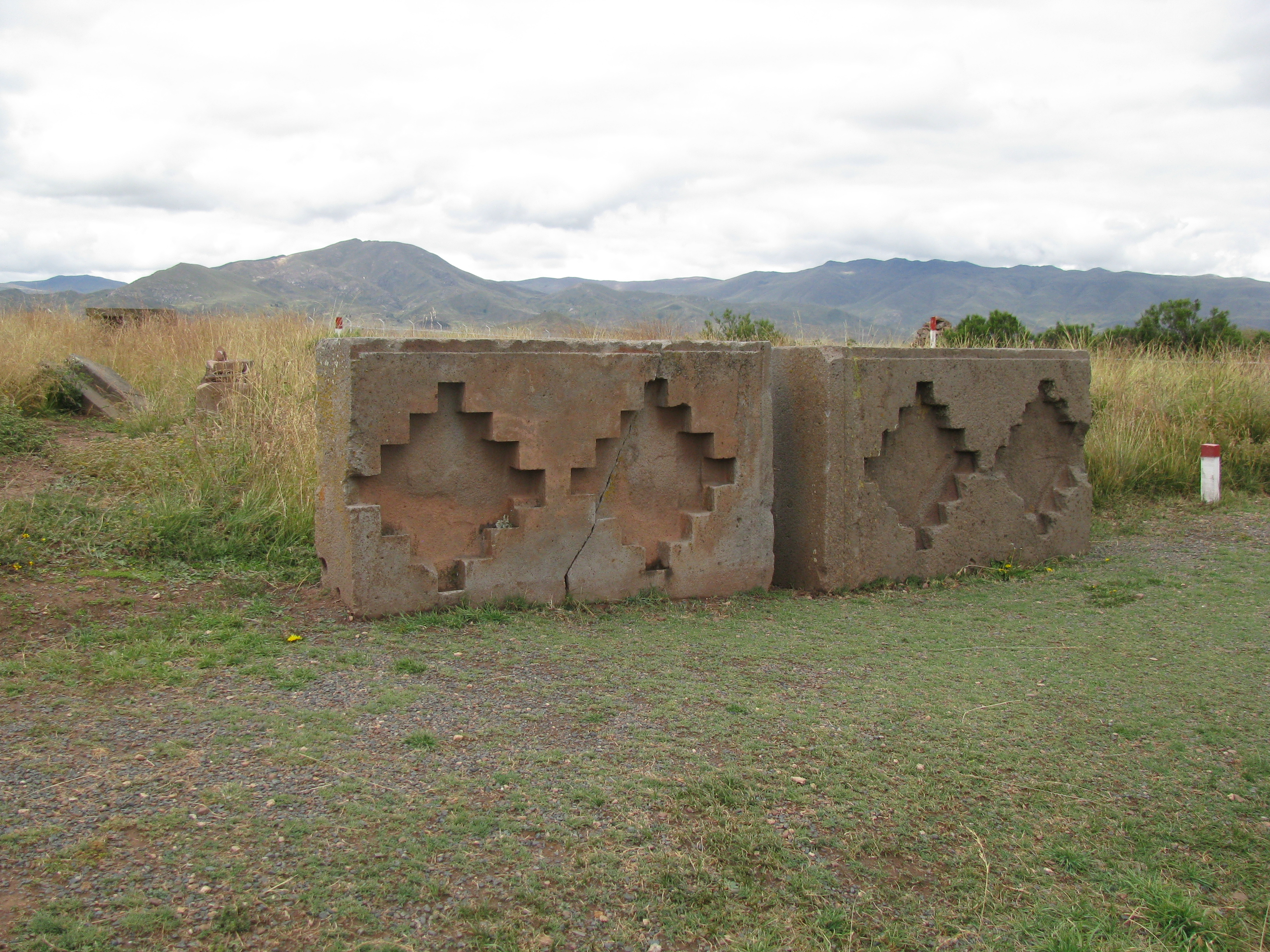
"stepped or Andean cross motif" at Kantatayita (Tiwanaku)

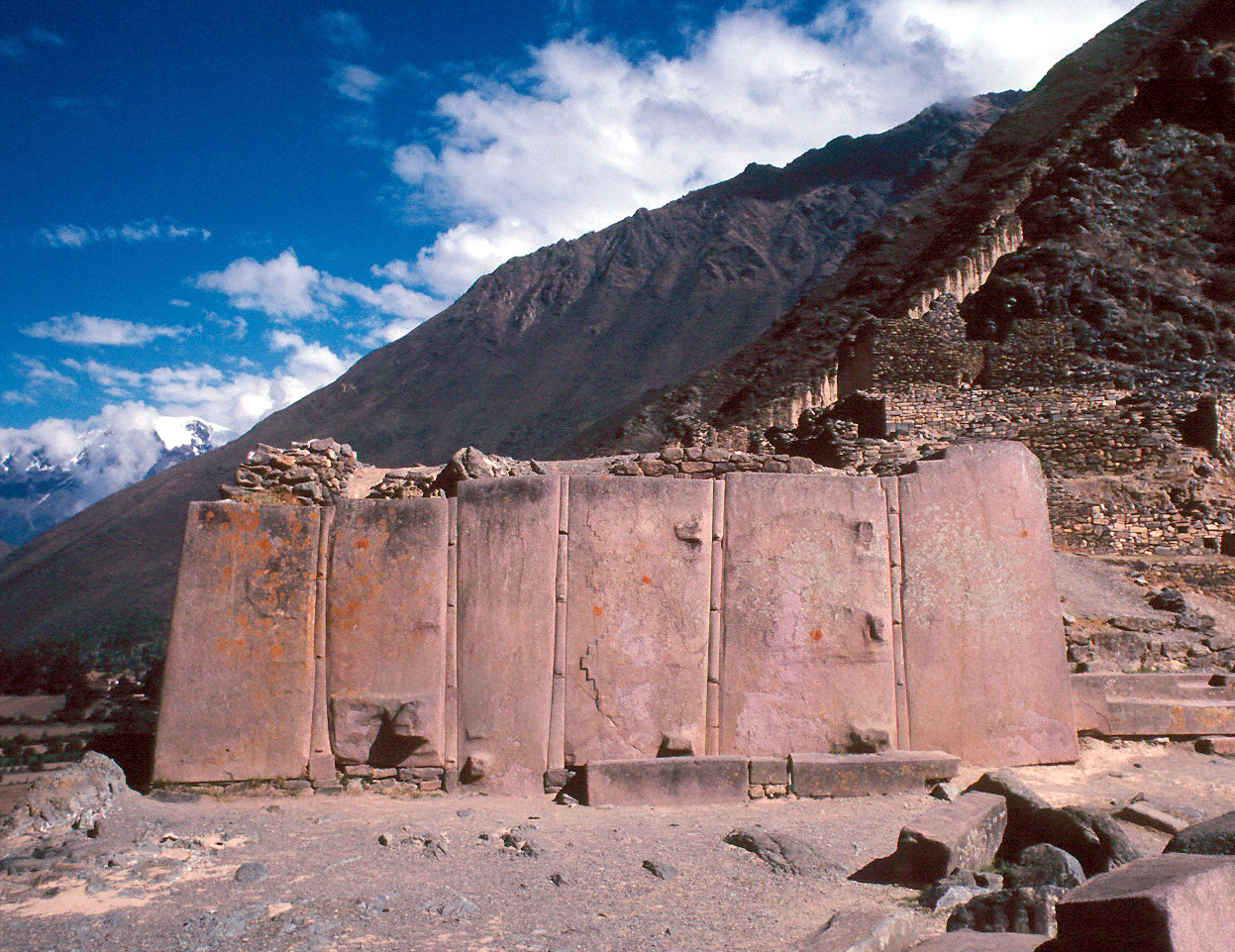
Wall of the Six Monoliths at Ollantaytambo with "step motif"

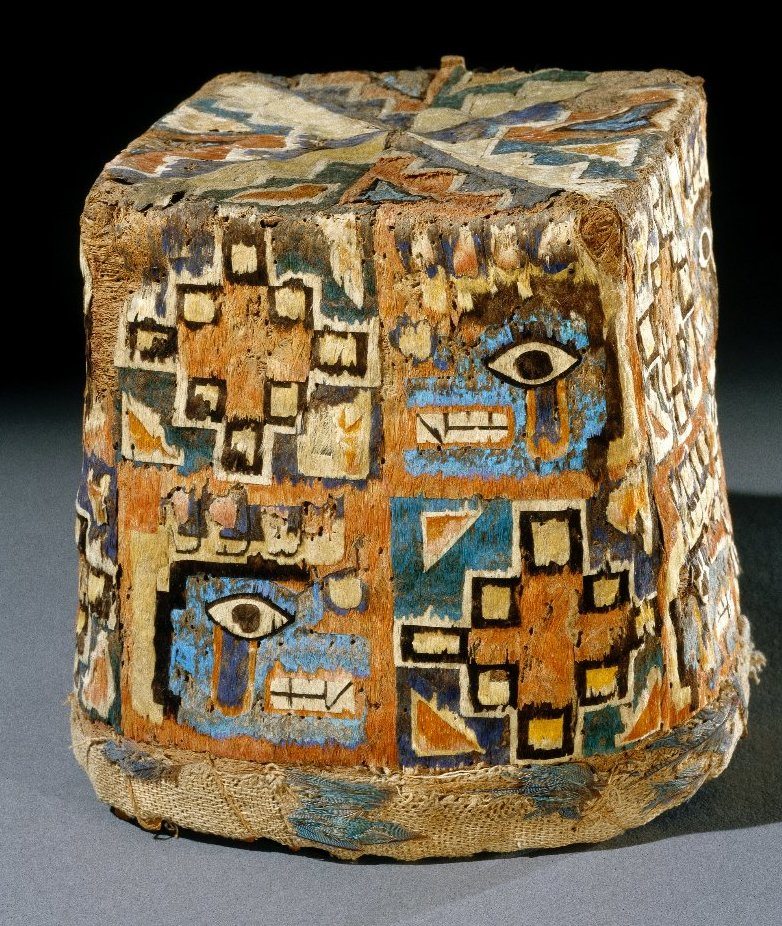
Four-Cornered Wari Hat

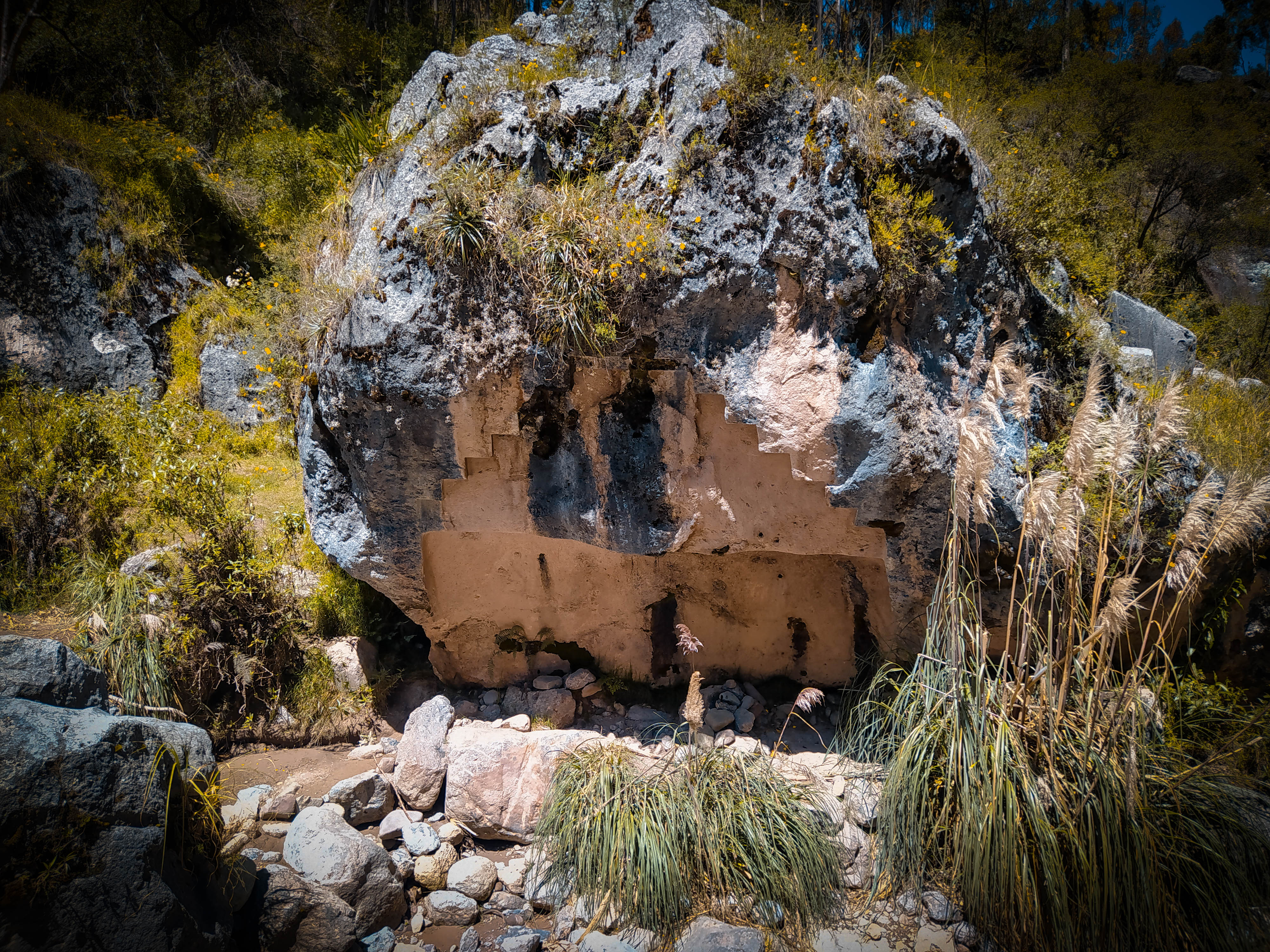
Chakana at Kanchisqocha

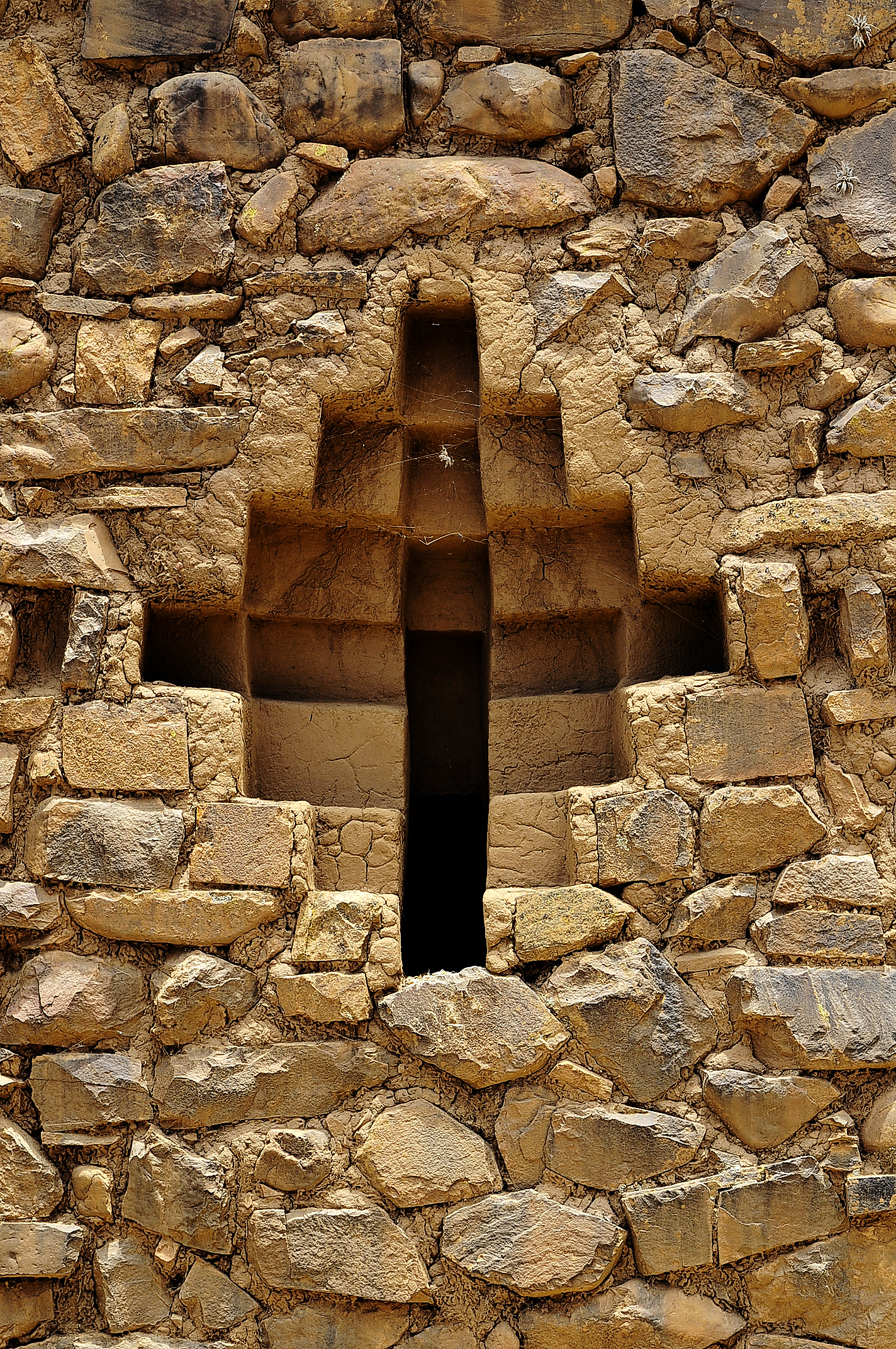
"Andean cross motif" at Iñaq Uyu

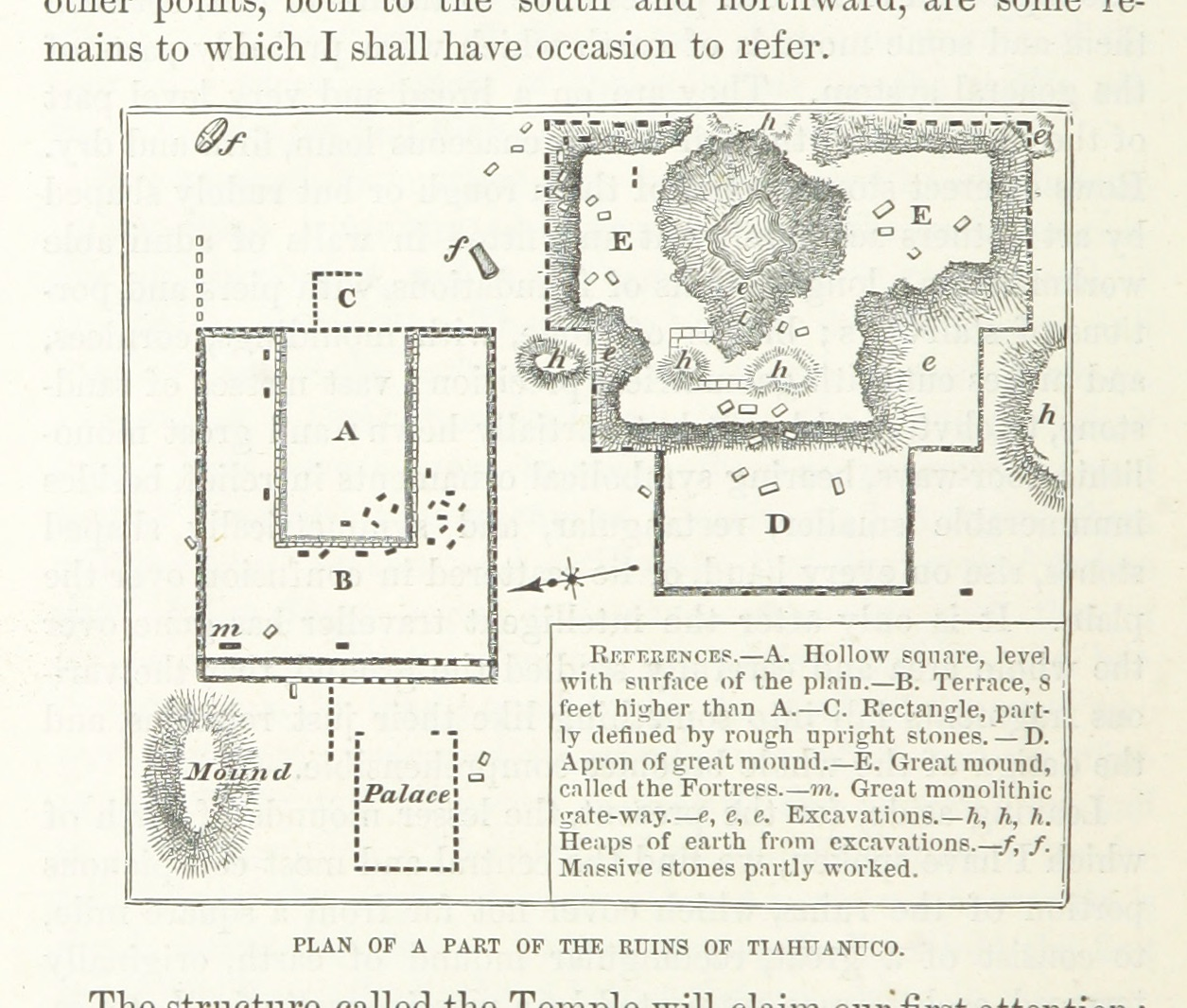
The plan of Akapana is often described as "half Andean Cross"

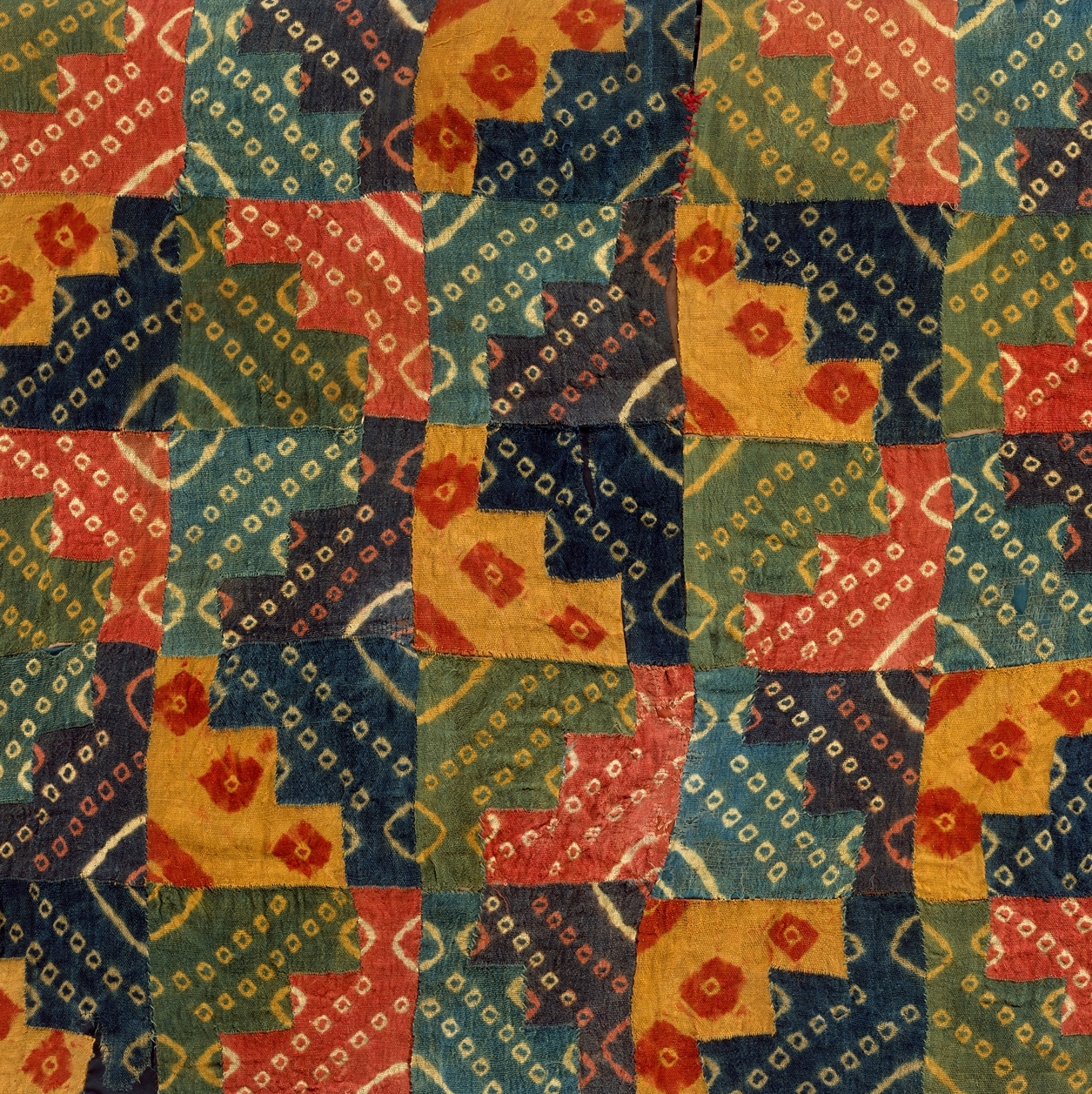
Chakana on a Wari Tunic

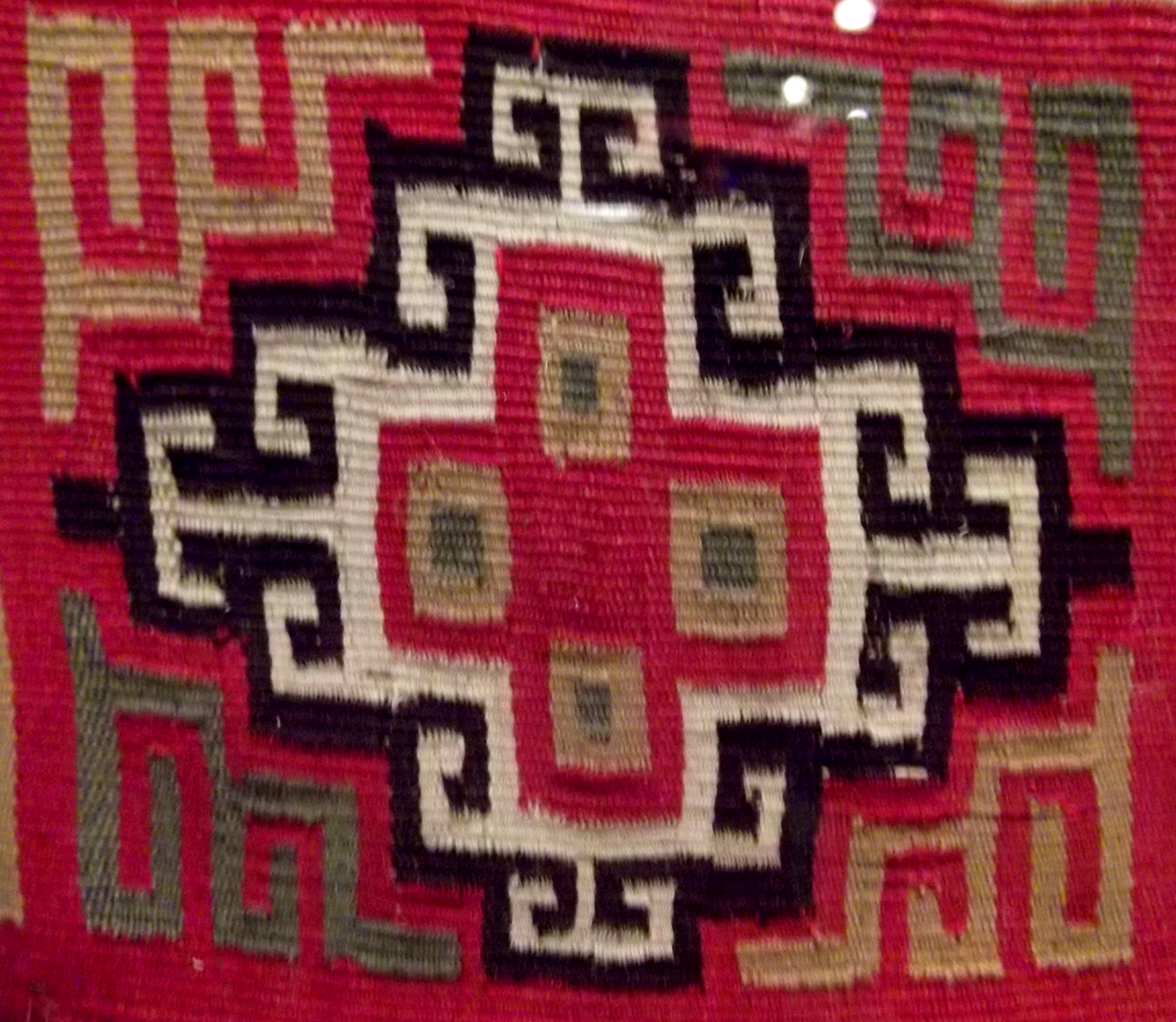
Chakana on an Inca Uncu

== Contemporary interpretations and perspectives ==
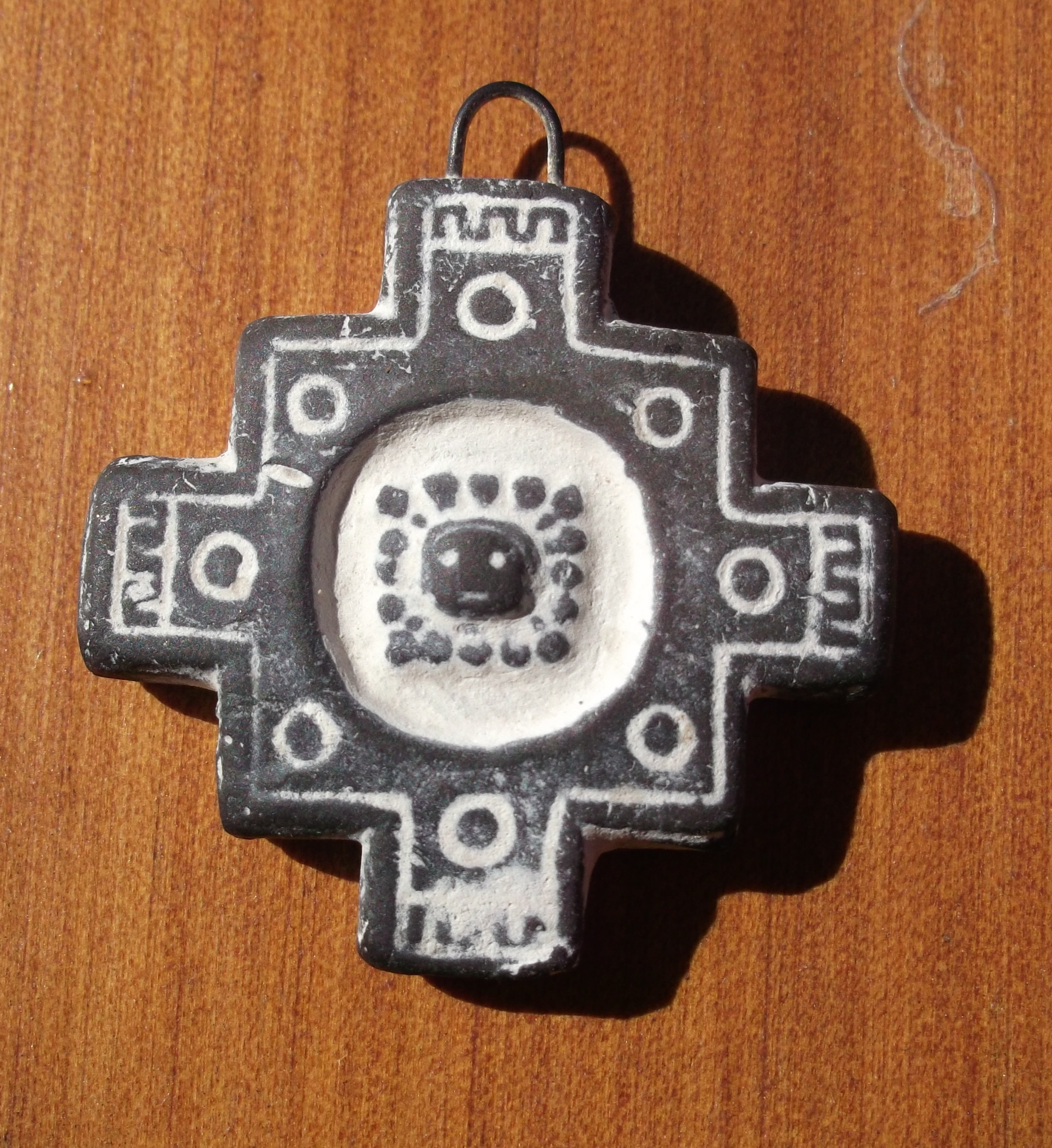
Chakana pendant crafted from polished soft stone, originating from the province of Jujuy in northwest Argentina. This indigenous design is commonly found in local markets in various parts of South America.

The stepped motif has received strong attention from various New Age practitioners and contemporary spiritual leaders. These people claim a relationship with the constellation of the Southern Cross and that all corners and steps have special symbolic meanings. According to art historian Jessica Joyce Christie, the Inca may have shared some of those meanings; however Christie notes that the New Age claim "[...] is purely speculative and unsubstantiated by any historical sources."
