= Akapana =

Mound of the Tiwanaku culture

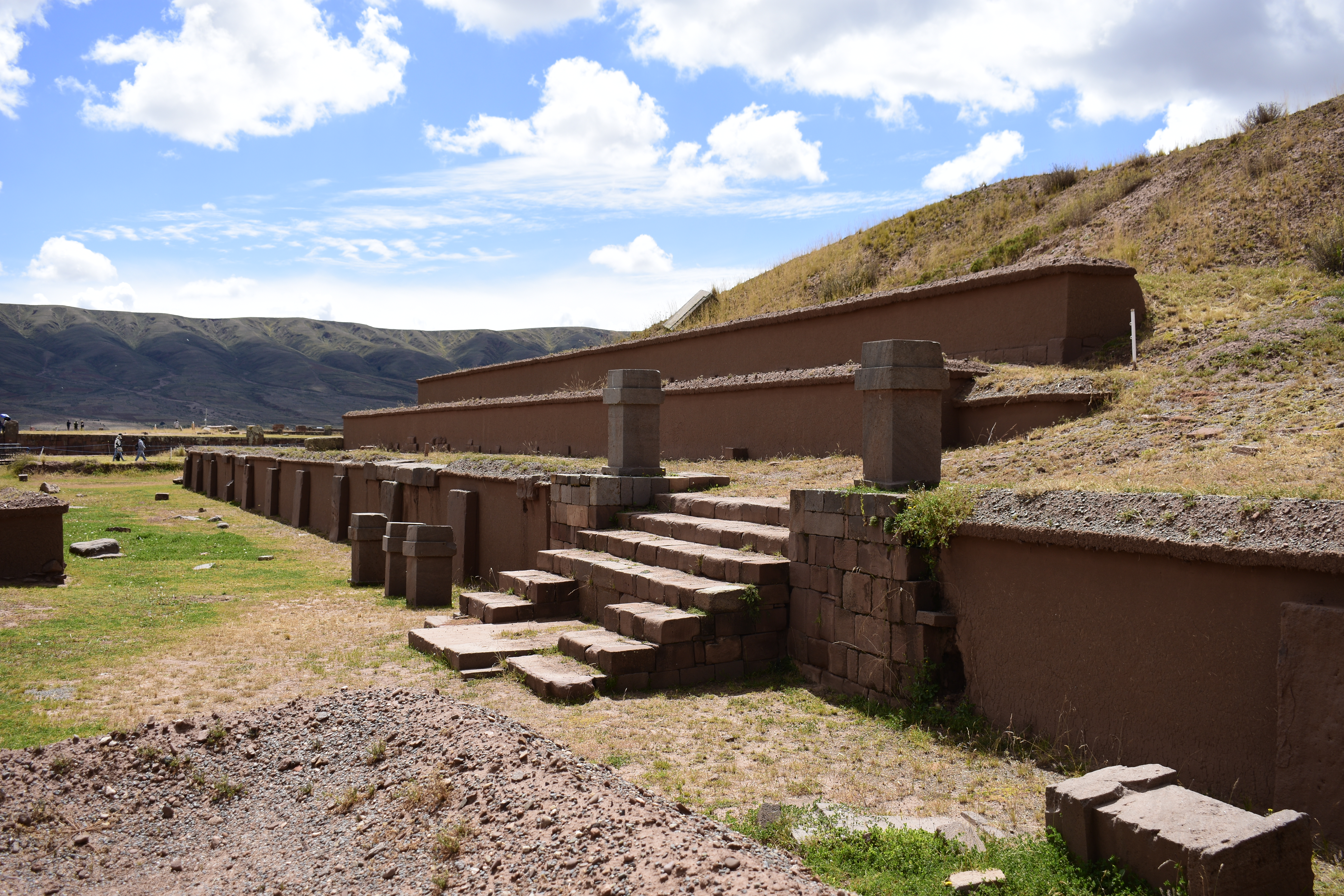
- Interactive map of Akapana
- 16°33′23″S 68°40′22″W
- Type: Platform mound
- Cultures: Tiwanaku polity
- Location: Bolivia

Site notes
- Material: Andesite

Akapana (Akkapana) is an artificial platform mound (sometimes referred to as a pyramid) at the pre-Columbian archaeological site of Tiwanaku in Bolivia, located in the department of La Paz. It is composed of seven levels of platforms contained by carved sandstone walls.

The Akapana is a "half Andean Cross"-shaped structure that is 257 m wide, 197 m broad at its maximum, and 16.5 m tall. At its center appears to have been a sunken court. This was nearly destroyed by a deep looters excavation that extends from the center of this structure to its eastern side. Material from the looter's excavation was dumped off the eastern side of the Akapana. A staircase is present on its western side. Possible residential complexes might have occupied both the northeast and southeast corners of this structure.

Originally, the Akapana was thought to have been developed from a modified hill. Twenty-first-century studies have shown that it is an entirely man-made earthen mound, faced with a mixture of large and small stone blocks. The dirt comprising Akapana appears to have been excavated from the "moat" that surrounds the site. The largest stone block within the Akapana, made of andesite, is estimated to weigh 65.7 tons. Tenon stone blocks in the form of puma and human heads stud the upper terraces.

== See also ==
- Pumapunku
- Kalasasaya
