= Pumapunku =

Terraced platform mound in Bolivia

Coordinates: 16°33′42″S 68°40′48″W

- Puma Punku
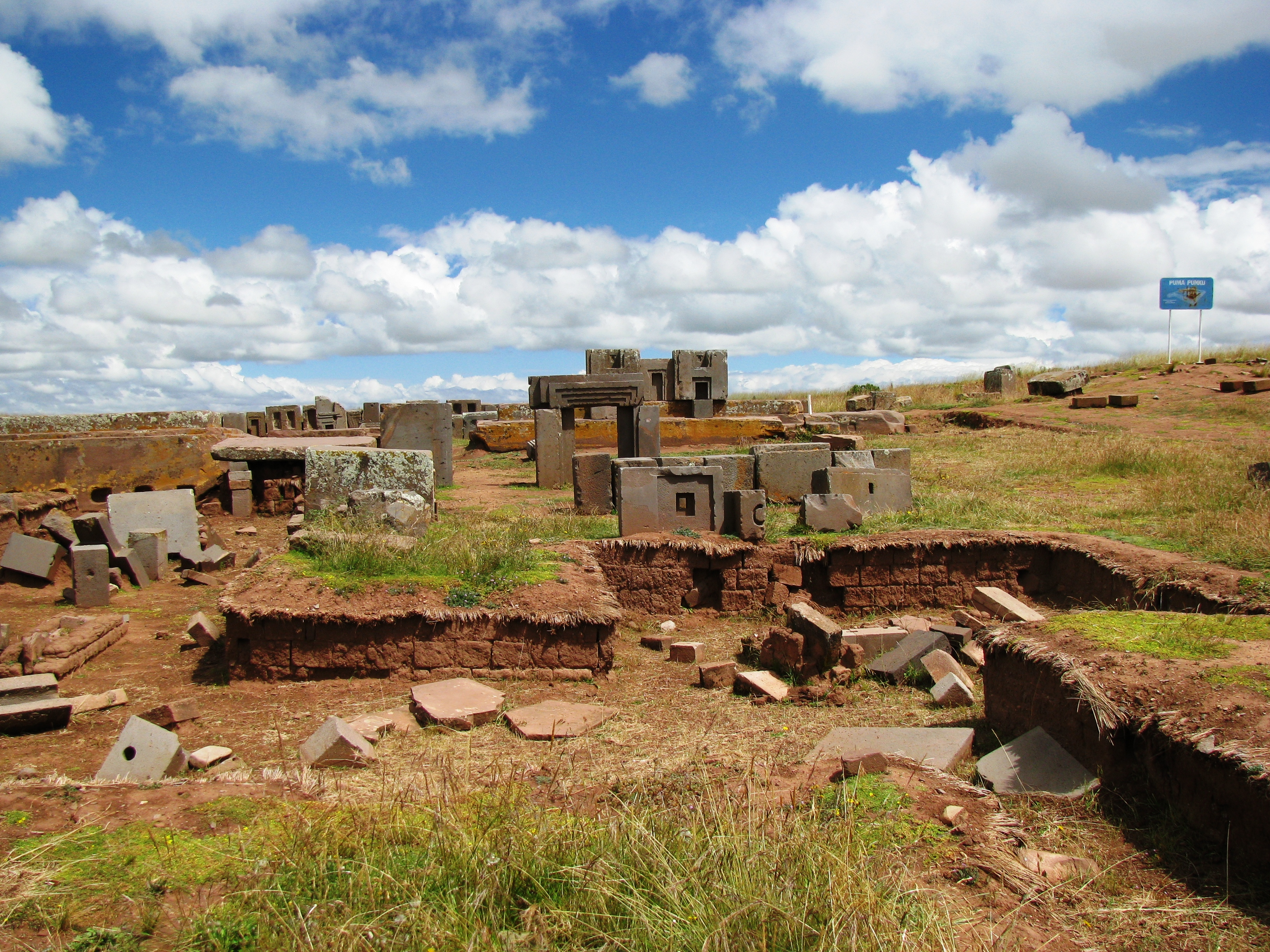
- View at the ruins of Pumapunku
- Interactive map of Pumapunku
- Type: platform mound
- Cultures: Tiwanaku empire
- Location: Western Bolivia
- Part of: Tiwanaku Site

History
- Built: 536–600

Site notes
- Material: sifted and layered soils (mound), andesite (superstructure), sandstone (foundation and internal channels), ternary Cu–As–Ni bronze alloy (cramps), mortar of lime and sand with ground-up malachite (turquoise green plaster floor), clay (red floor)
- Elevation: 3,850 m (12,630 ft)
- Length: 116.7 m (383 ft)
- Width: 167.4 m (549 ft)
- Area: at least 14 hectares
- Architectural style: Pumapunku Style architecture
- Excavation dates: Alexei Vranich
- Discovered: 1549 by Pedro Cieza de León (first European visitor)
- Condition: Ruined

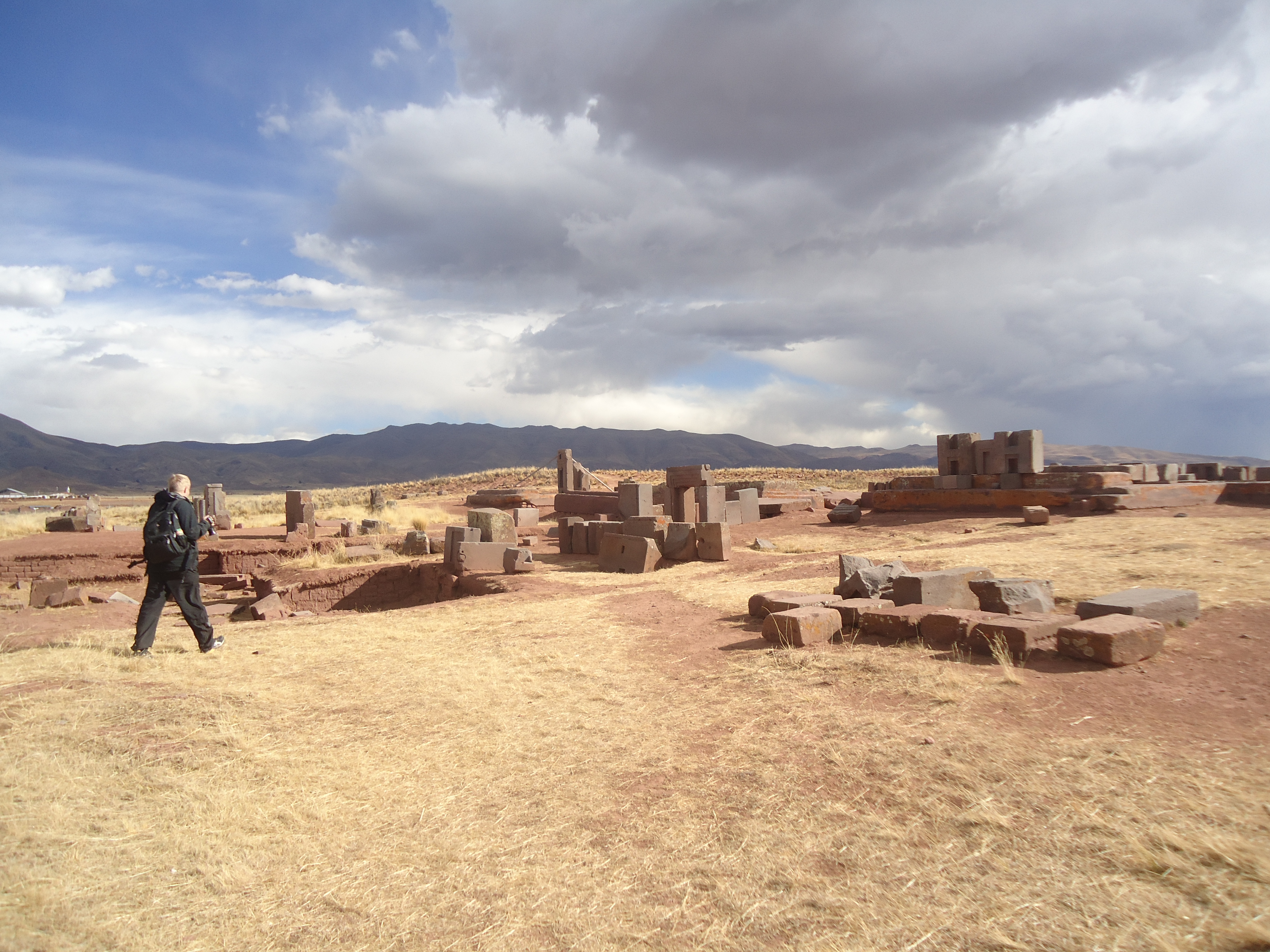
Stone blocks at Pumapunku

Pumapunku or Puma Punku (Aymara and Quechua 'Gate of the Puma') is a 6th-century T-shaped and strategically aligned man-made terraced platform mound with a sunken court and monumental structure on top, near Tiwanaku, La Paz, Bolivia. It is part of the Pumapunku complex, at the Tiwanaku Site, an ancient archeological complex in the Andes of western Bolivia that has been designated a UNESCO World Heritage Site.

The Pumapunku complex is a collection of plazas and ramps centered on the Pumapunku platform mound. Long ago the monumental complex on top of the Puma Punku platform mound deteriorated or was destroyed, and now only ruins remain of this feature.

Construction of Puma Punku is believed to have begun after AD 536. Pumapunku was the most important construction in Tiwanaku, other than Akapana, which is believed to be "Pumapunku's twin". Among the place names in Tiwanaku, only the names "Akapana" and "Pumapunku" have historical relevance.

Pumapunku holds several miniature gates that are perfect replicas of once standing full-size gateways. In addition to these miniature gateways, likely, at least five gateways (and several blind miniature gateways) were once (or were intended to be) integrated into the Pumapunku monumental complex. The foundation platform of Pumapunku supported as many as eight andesite gateways. The fragments of five andesite gateways with similar characteristics to the Gateway of the Sun were found.

Tiwanaku, the location of Pumapunku, is significant in Inca traditions. According to traditions, Tiwanaku is believed to be the site where the world was created.

The Pumapunku complex consists of an unwalled western court, a central unwalled esplanade, a terraced platform mound that is faced with stone, and a walled eastern court.

At its peak, Pumapunku is thought to have been "unimaginably wondrous," adorned with polished metal plaques, brightly colored ceramic and fabric ornamentation, and visited by costumed citizens, elaborately dressed priests, and elites decked in exotic jewelry. Current understanding of this complex is limited due to its age, the lack of a written record, and the current deteriorated state of the structures due to treasure hunting, looting, stone mining for building stone and railroad ballast, and natural weathering.

== Cultural and spiritual significance ==
According to some theories, the Pumapunku complex and surrounding monumental structures like Akapana, Kalasasaya, Putuni, and Kerikala functioned as spiritual and ritual centers for the Tiwanaku. This area might be the center of the Andean world, attracting pilgrims from far away to marvel in its beauty. These structures transformed the local landscape; Pumapunku was integrated with Illimani mountain. The spiritual significance and the sense of wonder might be amplified into a "mind-altering and life-changing experience" through the use of hallucinogenic plants. Examinations of hair samples exhibit remnants of psychoactive substances in many mummies found in Tiwanaku culture from Northern Chile, including babies as young as one year of age, demonstrating the importance of these substances to the Tiwanaku.

== History ==
The Tiwanaku civilization and the use of these enclosures and platform mounds appears to peak from AD 700 to 1000, by which point, the city core and surrounding area could house 10,000 to 20,000 residents. An extensive infrastructure was developed, including a complex irrigation system extending more than 30 square miles (80 km^{2}) to support cultivation of potatoes, quinoa, corn, and other various crops. During their peak centuries, the Tiwanaku culture dominated the Lake Titicaca basin as well as portions of Bolivia and Chile.

Apparently, this culture dissolved abruptly some time around AD 1000, and researchers can only guess the reasons. A likely scenario involves rapid onset extended drought. Unable to produce the massive crop yields necessary for their large population, the Tiwanaku apparently scattered into the local mountain ranges, then disappeared shortly thereafter. Apparently, Puma Punku was abandoned before its builders could complete it.

When the Spanish arrived at Tiwanaku, architecture was still standing at Pumapunku. Bernabé Cobo reports that one gateway and one "window" still stood upright on one of the platforms.

== Description ==
The Pumapunku is a terraced earthen mound faced with blocks. It is 167.4 metres (549 feet) wide along its north–south axis and 116.7 metres (383 feet) long along its east–west axis. On the northeast and southeast corners of the Pumapunku, it has 20-metre (66-foot) wide projections extending 27.6 metres (91 feet) north and south from the rectangular mound.

The eastern edge of the Pumapunku is occupied by the Plataforma Lítica. This structure consists of a stone terrace 6.8 by 38.7 metres (22 by 127 feet) in dimension. This terrace is paved with multiple enormous stone blocks. It contains the largest stone slab in the Pumapunku and Tiwanaku Site, measuring 7.8 metres (26 feet) long, 5.2 metres (17 feet) wide and averages 1.1 m (3 ft 7 in) thick. Based on the specific gravity of the red sandstone from which it was carved, this stone slab is estimated to weigh 131 tonnes (144 short tons). The remarkable aspects of the sandstone slabs, including their size and smooth surfaces have drawn comments for several centuries.

The other stonework and facing of the Pumapunku consists of a mixture of andesite and red sandstone. Pumapunku's core consists of clay, while the fill under parts of its edge consists of river sand and cobbles instead of clay. Excavations documented "three major building epochs plus repairs and re-modeling".

The even older Kalasasaya complex a kilometre away shows a long period of settlement in the area. The area between the Pumapunku and the Kalasasaya complex a kilometre away was surveyed around 2007 using ground-penetrating radar, magnetometry, induced electrical conductivity, and magnetic susceptibility. The geophysical data collected from these surveys and excavations indicate the presence of numerous man-made structures in the area between the Pumapunku and Kalasasaya complexes. These structures include the wall foundations of buildings and compounds, water conduits, pool-like features, revetments, terraces, residential compounds, and widespread gravel pavements, all of which are buried and hidden beneath the modern ground surface.

The area was mapped with a drone in 2016. The survey showed the site is seventeen hectares in size, of which only two hectares are unearthed. Two additional platforms exist underground.

== Age ==
Noted by Andean specialist, W. H. Isbell, professor at Binghamton University, a radiocarbon date was obtained by Alexei Vranich from organic material from the deepest and oldest layer of mound-fill forming the Pumapunku. This layer was deposited during the first of three construction epochs, and dates the initial construction of the Pumapunku to AD 536–600 (1510 ±25 B.P. C14, calibrated date). Since the radiocarbon date came from the deepest and oldest layer of mound-fill under the andesite and sandstone stonework, the stonework was probably constructed sometime after AD 536–600. The excavation trenches of Vranich show the clay, sand, and gravel fill of the Pumapunku complex were laid directly on the sterile middle Pleistocene sediments. These excavation trenches also demonstrated the lack of any pre-Andean Middle Horizon cultural deposits within the area of the Tiwanaku Site adjacent to the Pumapunku complex.

== Engineering ==
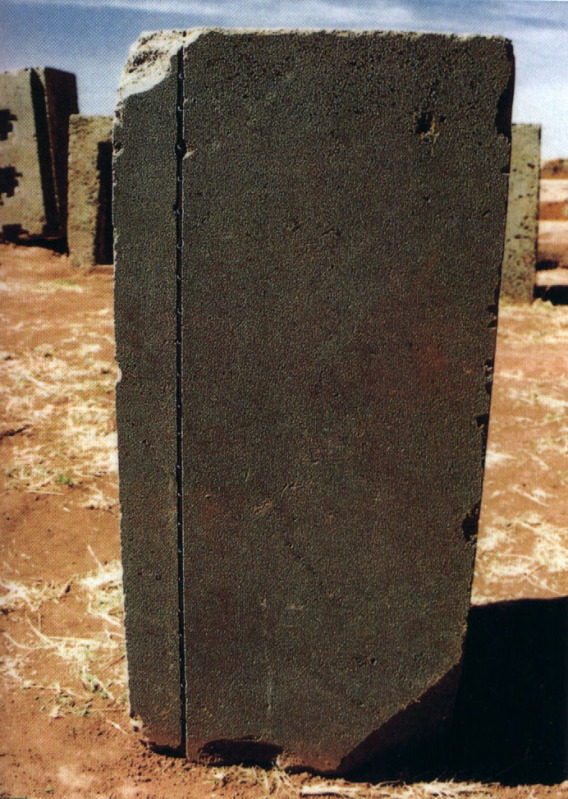
Detail of stone with precisely cut straight line and tooled holes within the line

The largest of Pumapunku's stone blocks is 7.81 metres (25.6 feet) long, 5.17 metres (17.0 feet) wide, averages 1.07 metres (3 feet 6 inches) thick, and is estimated to weigh about 131 tonnes (144 short tons). The second largest stone block found within the complex is 7.90 metres (25.9 feet) long, 2.50 metres (8 feet 2 inches) wide, and averages 1.86 metres (6 feet 1 inch) thick. Its weight is estimated to be 85.21 tonnes (93.93 short tons). Both of these stone blocks are part of the Plataforma Lítica, and are red sandstone. Based on detailed petrographic and chemical analyses of samples from individual stones and known quarry sites, archaeologists concluded these and other red sandstone blocks were transported up a steep incline from a quarry near Lake Titicaca roughly 10 kilometres (6.2 miles) away. Smaller andesite blocks for stone facing and carvings came from quarries within the Copacabana Peninsula about 90 kilometres (56 miles) away from and across Lake Titicaca from the Pumapunku and the rest of the Tiwanaku Site.

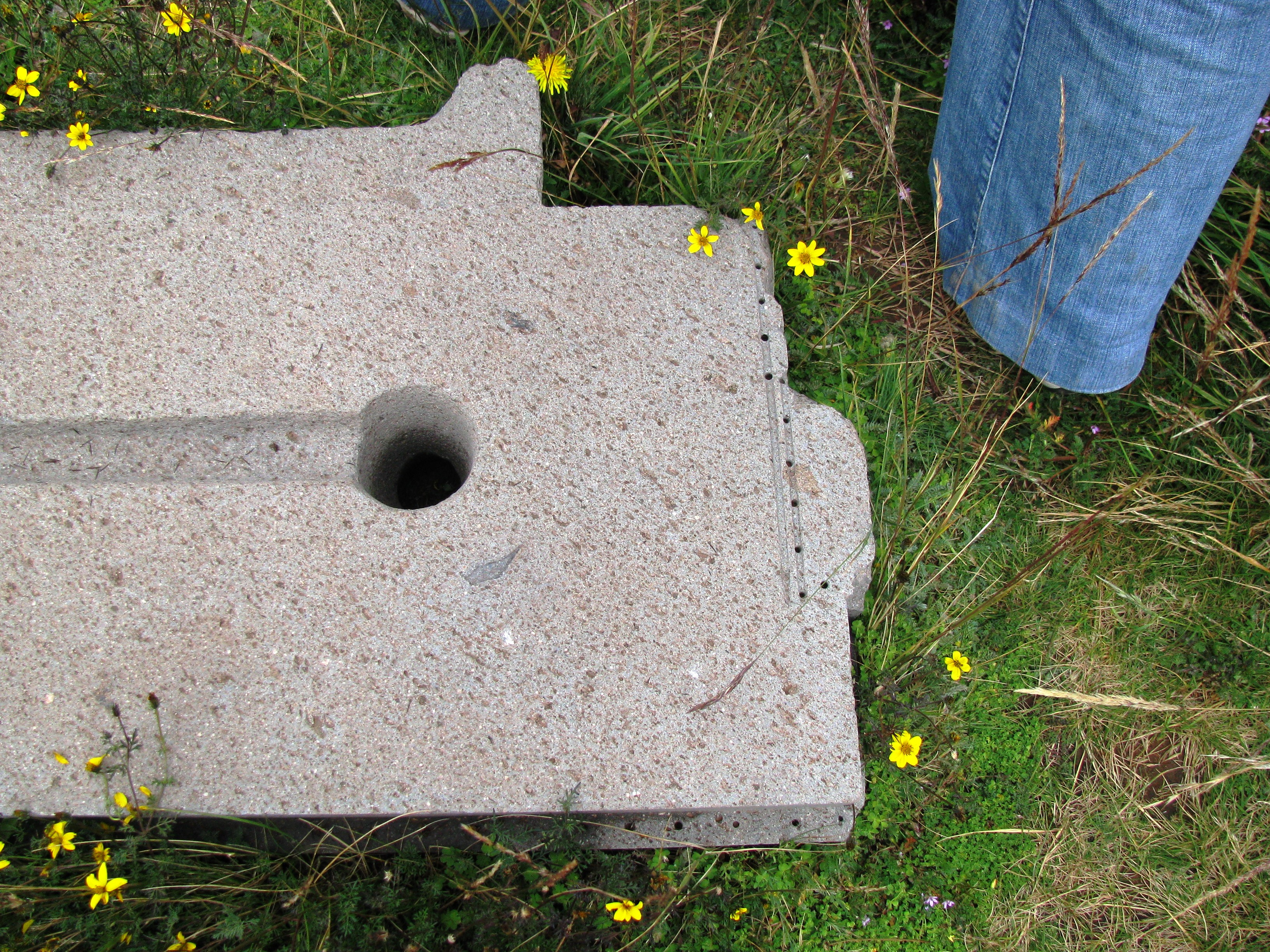
An example of high-precision small holes

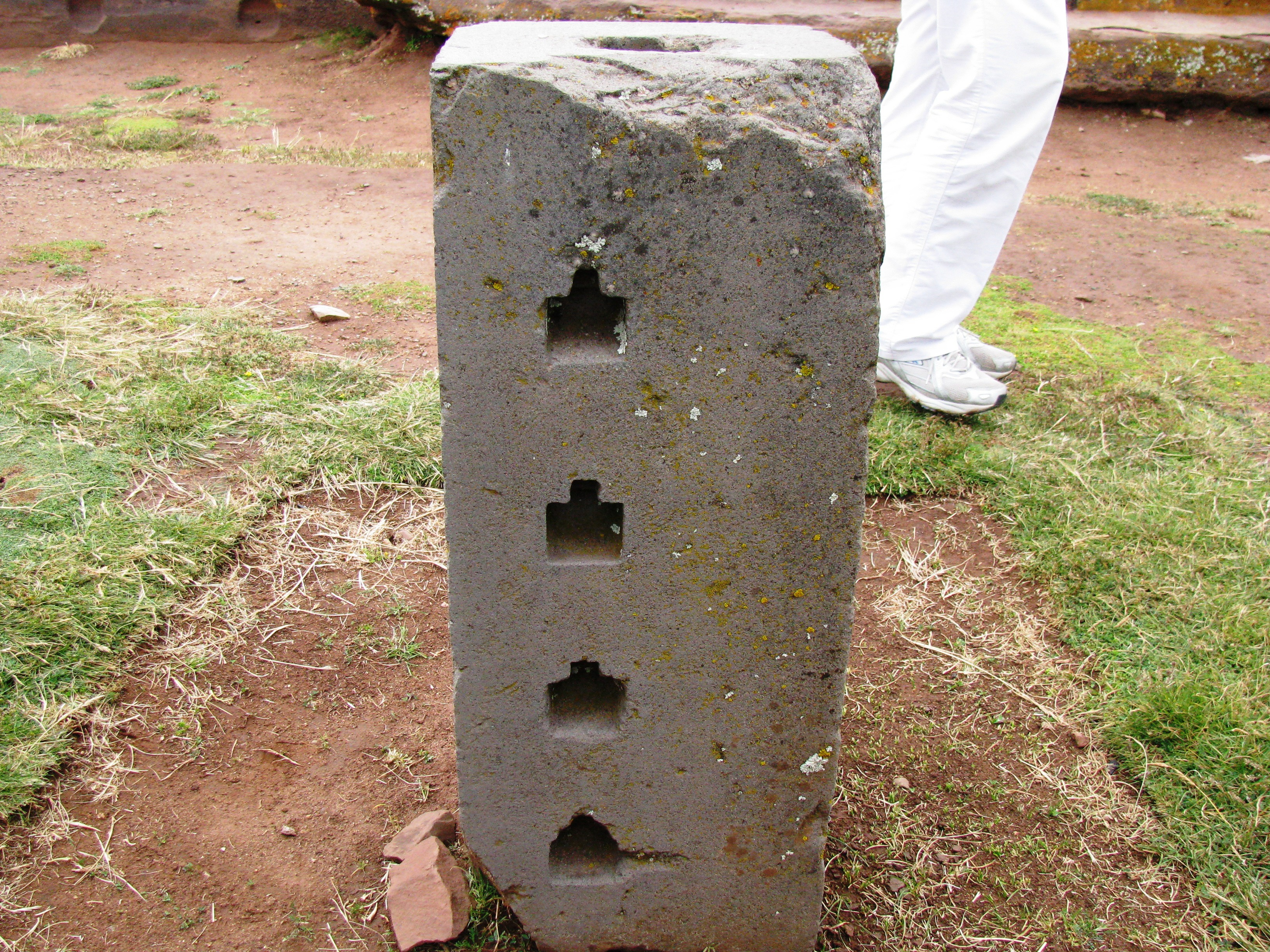
Unfinished (upside down) block of andesite with blind holes. On finished blocks, each blind hole houses a tiny T-shaped cramp socket, proving that the blocks should be mated with others.

Archaeologists dispute whether the transport of these stones was by the large labor force of ancient Tiwanaku. Several conflicting speculative theories attempt to imagine how this labor force transported the stones. Two common possibilities involve the use of llama skin ropes, and the use of ramps and inclined planes.

In assembling the walls of Pumapunku, each stone interlocked with the surrounding stones. The blocks were fit together like a puzzle, forming load-bearing joints. Jean-Pierre Protzen and Stella Nair identified a 1 to 1.5 millimeters thick thin coat of whiteish material covering some of the stones as a possible layer of mortar. One common engineering technique involves cutting the top of the lower stone at a certain angle, and placing another stone on top of it which was cut at the same angle. The precision with which these angles create flush joints is indicative of sophisticated knowledge of stone-cutting and a thorough understanding of descriptive geometry. Much of the masonry is characterized by accurately cut rectilinear blocks of such uniformity, they could be interchanged for one another while maintaining a level surface and even joints. Although similar, the blocks do not have the same dimensions. The precise cuts suggest the possibility of pre-fabrication and mass production. Some of the stones are in an unfinished state, showing some of the techniques used to shape them. The architectural historians Jean-Pierre and Stella Nair who conducted the first professional field study on the stones of Tiwanaku/Pumapunku conclude:

[…] to obtain the smooth finishes, the perfectly planar faces and exact interior and exterior right angles on the finely dressed stones, they resorted to techniques unknown to the Incas and to us at this time [1997]. […] The sharp and precise 90° interior angles observed on various decorative motifs most likely were not made with hammerstones. No matter how fine the hammerstone's point, it could never produce the crisp right interior angles seen on Tiahuanaco stonework. Comparable cuts in Inca masonry all have rounded interior angles typical of the pounding technique […]. The construction tools of the Tiahuanacans, with perhaps the possible exception of hammerstones, remain essentially unknown and have yet to be discovered.

According to Protzen and Nair, no tools have been excavated that were used in the construction of Tiwanaku, or if they have, they have not been identified as tools. According to the art historian Jessica Joyce Christie, the experiments of Jean-Pierre Protzen and Stella Nair showed that the Tiwanaku artisans may have used tools other than hammerstones to facilitate the creation of exact geometric cuts and forms and of which archeology has no record.

Nair subsequently experimented with replicating a small section of a carving using a variety of possible stone tools, including blades, flakes and thin chisels made of stones including flint, agate, jasper, obsidian, hydrated obsidian, greywacke, quartzite, and hematite. (Bronze tools proved to be largely ineffective against hard andesite). She succeeded in carving a half-cross-shaped design about eight inches across, achieving the same high precision shown by the Puma Punku carvings. One element that she was unable to work out how to replicate was the accurately flat surface of the inside of the carving, and the researchers were struck by the ubiquity of such surfaces in the Tiahuanaco carvings. The process took 40 hours, although some of this was time taken in trial and error - the researchers estimated that it would take an experienced person about 25 hours.

Tiwanaku engineers also developed civic infrastructure at this complex, constructing functional irrigation systems, hydraulic mechanisms, and leak-proof sewage lines.

== Architecture ==
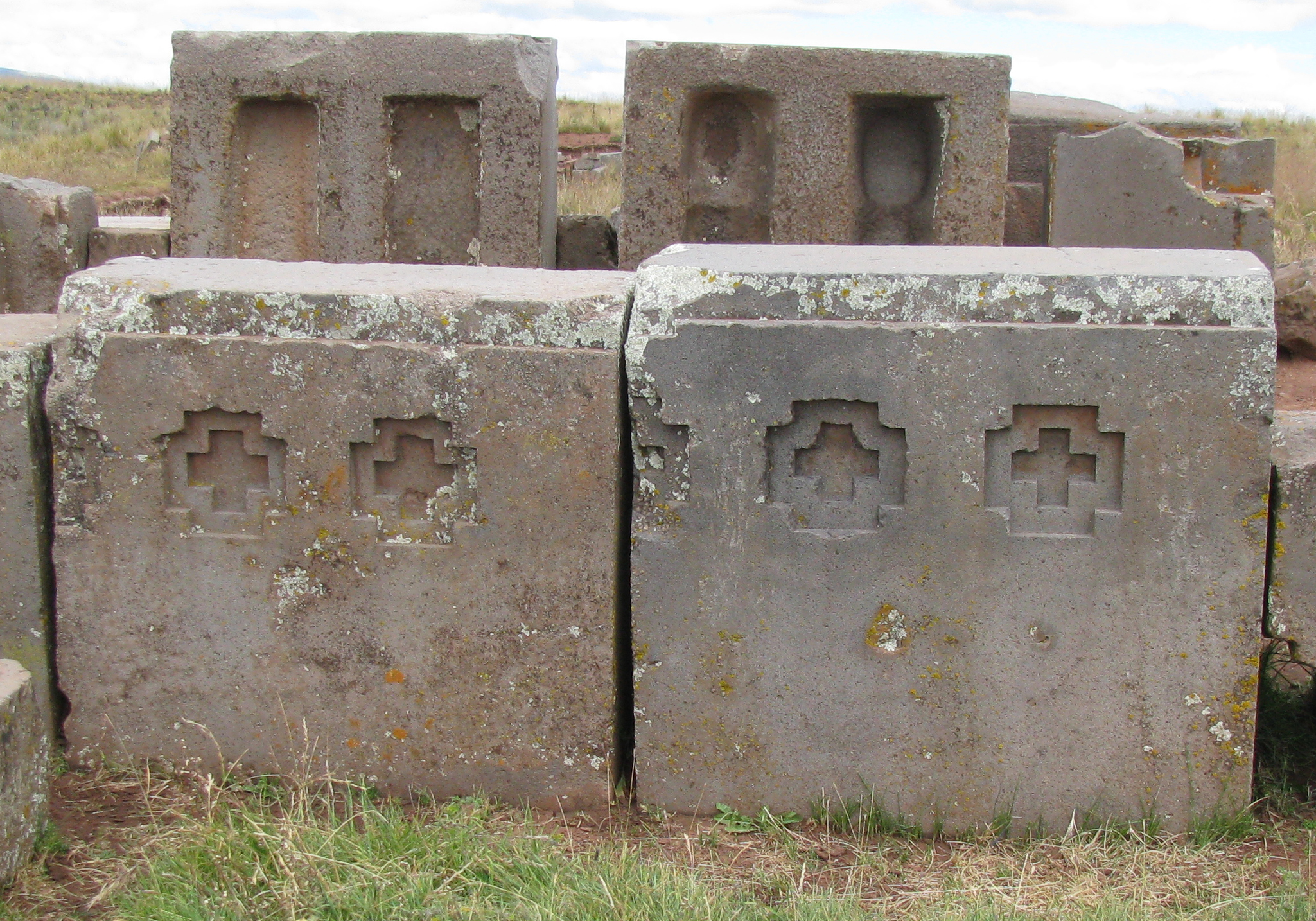
Demonstration of the building block technique

Pumapunku was a large earthen platform mound with three levels of stone retaining walls. Its layout is not square in plan, but rather T-shaped. To sustain the weight of these massive structures, Tiwanaku architects were meticulous in creating foundations, often fitting stones directly to bedrock or digging precise trenches and carefully filling them with layered sedimentary stones to support large stone blocks. Modern engineers argue that the base of Pumapunku was constructed using a technique called layering and depositing. By alternating layers of sand from the interior and layers of composite from the exterior, the fills overlap at the joints, grading the contact points to create a sturdy base.

== Use of cramps ==
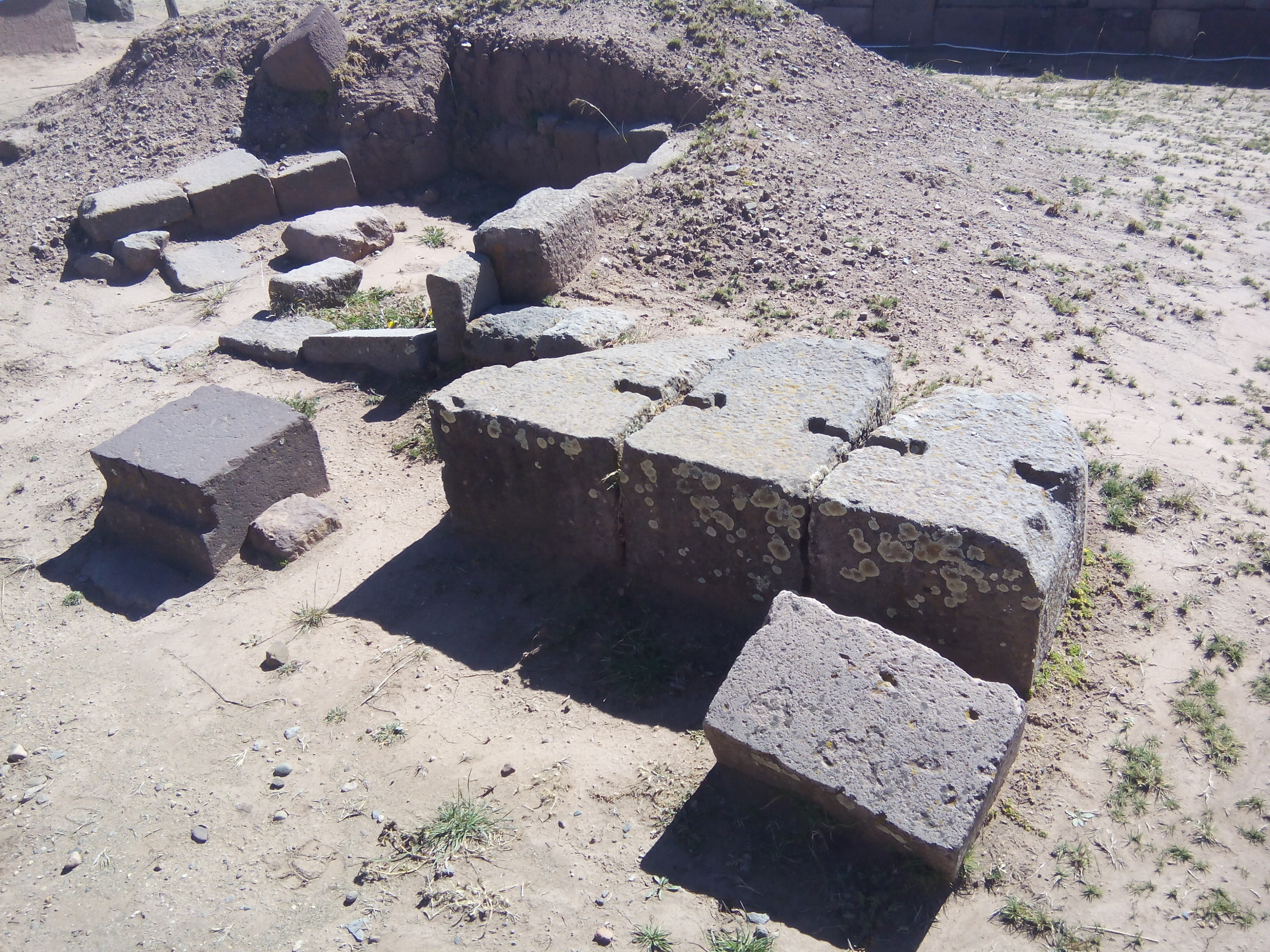
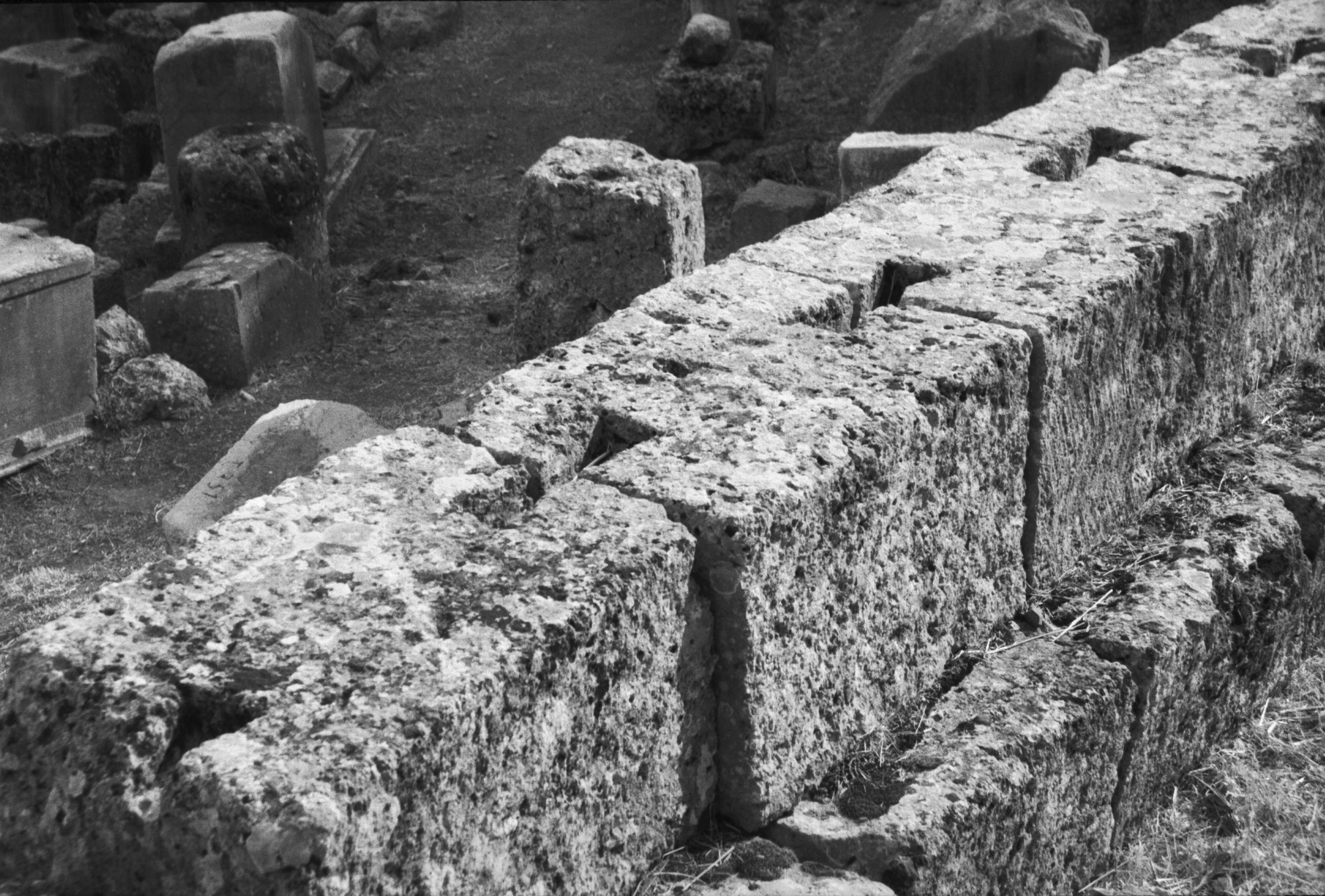
Cramp technique at Tiwanaku (above) compared to the one in Delphi (below)

Notable features at Pumapunku are I-shaped architectural cramps, composed of a unique copper-arsenic-nickel bronze alloy. These I-shaped cramps were also used on a section of canal found at the base of the terraced platform mound Akapana at Tiwanaku. These cramps hold the blocks comprising the walls and bottom of stone-lined canals to drain sunken courts. In the south canal of the Pumapunku, the I-shaped cramps were cast in place. In sharp contrast, the cramps used at the Akapana canal were fashioned by the cold hammering of copper-arsenic-nickel bronze ingots. The unique copper-arsenic-nickel bronze alloy is also found in metal artifacts within the region between Tiwanaku and San Pedro de Atacama during the late Middle Horizon around 600–900. Within Peru, T-shaped sockets can also be found at the Qorikancha and Ollantaytambo. The cramp technique can also be found at buildings of Ancient Egypt (e. g. at the temple of Khnum) and Ancient Greece (e.g. at the Erechtheion). According to Stübel and Uhle the cramp sockets of Olympia and the Erechtheum in Athens are of the same shape as the ones of Tiwanaku. They call it "strikingly consistent choice of technical means" ("auffallend übereinstimmenden Wahl der technischen Mittel") which they think is due to "similar patterns in human way of thinking" ("Gesetzmässigkeit der menschlichen Denkentwickelung").

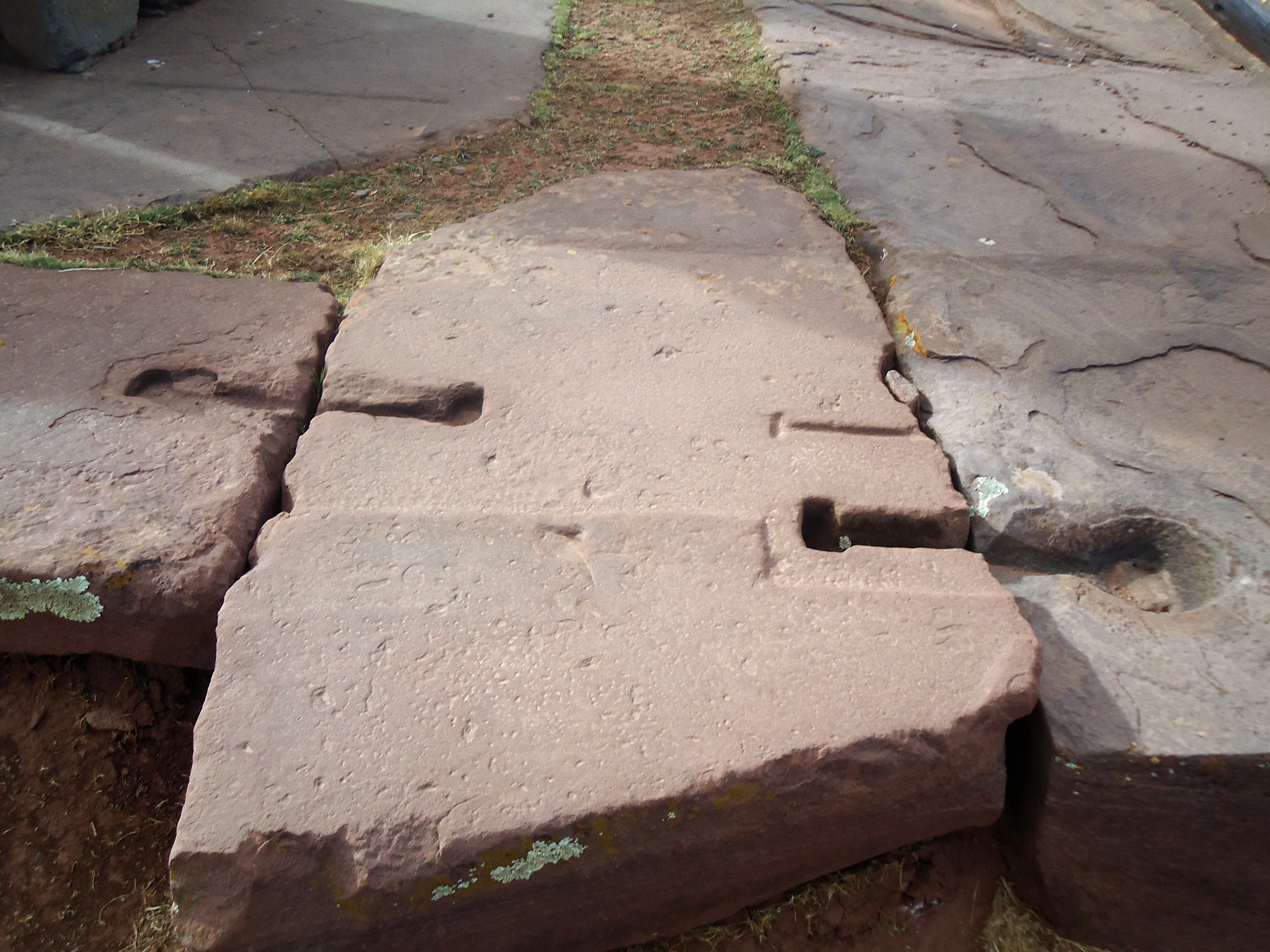
Cramp sockets in the foundation platforms of Pumapunku

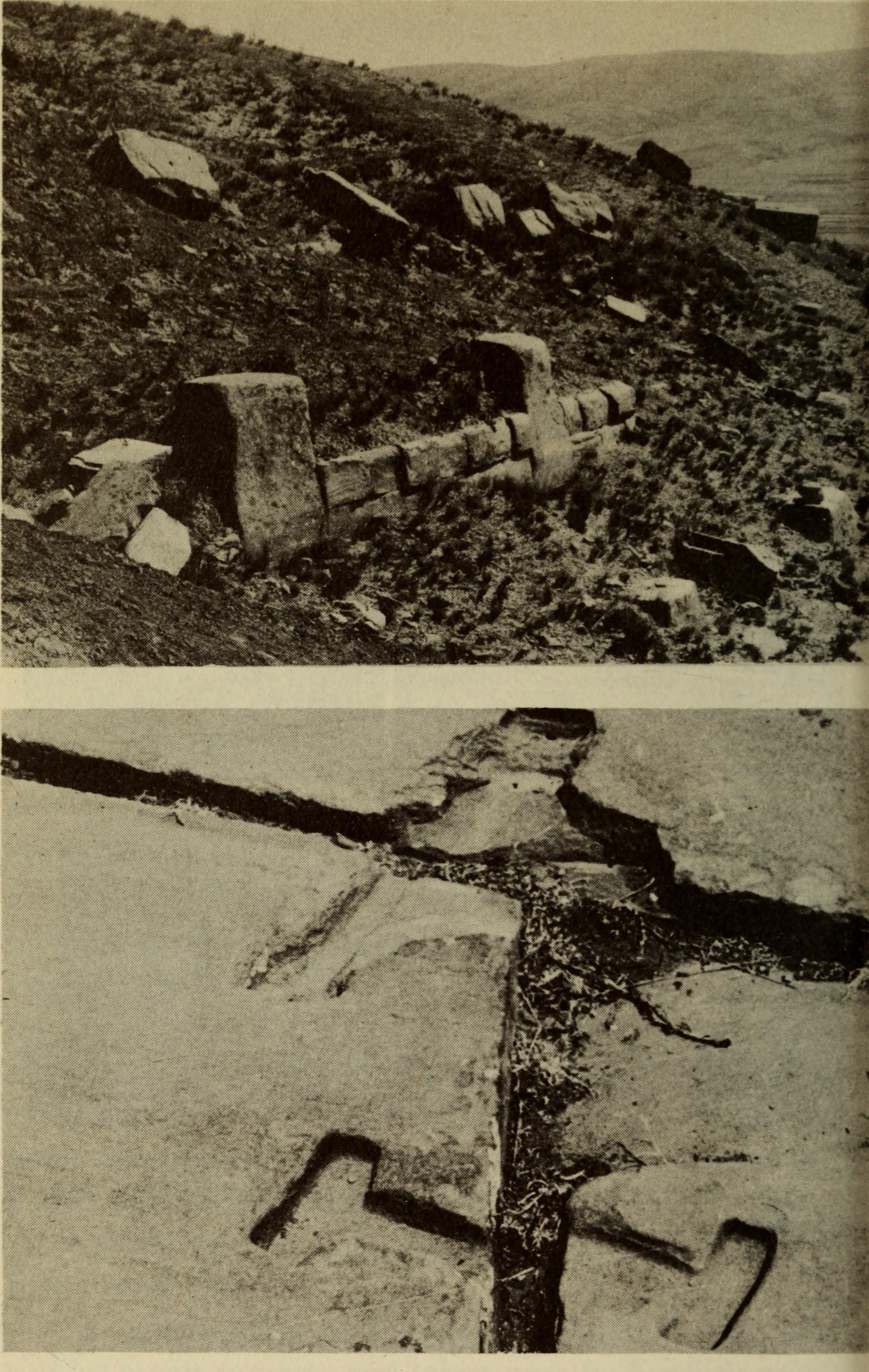
Cramp sockets in the foundation platforms of Pumapunku

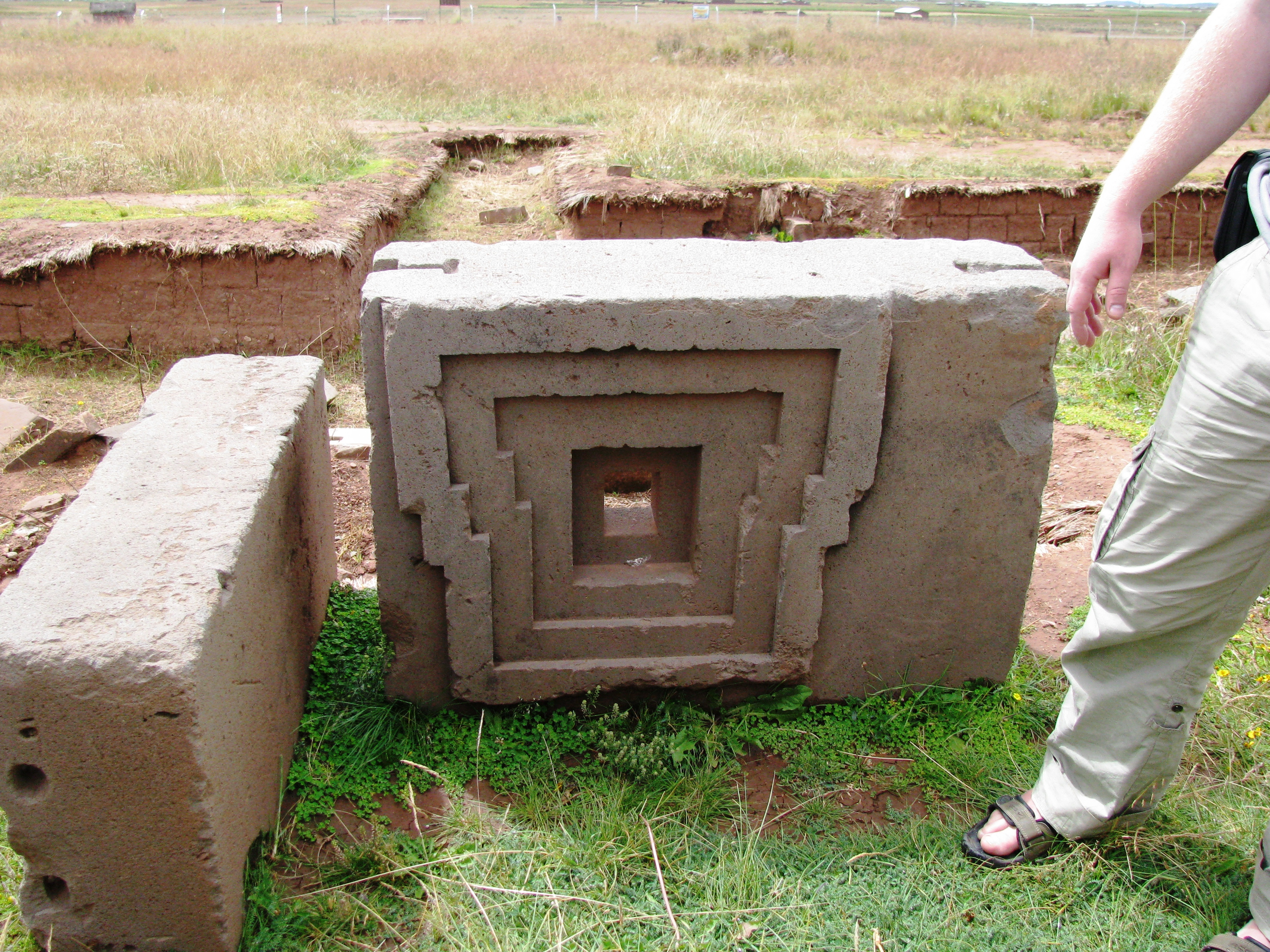
Ornamental stone with I-cramp sockets which suggests that more stones were added to this block

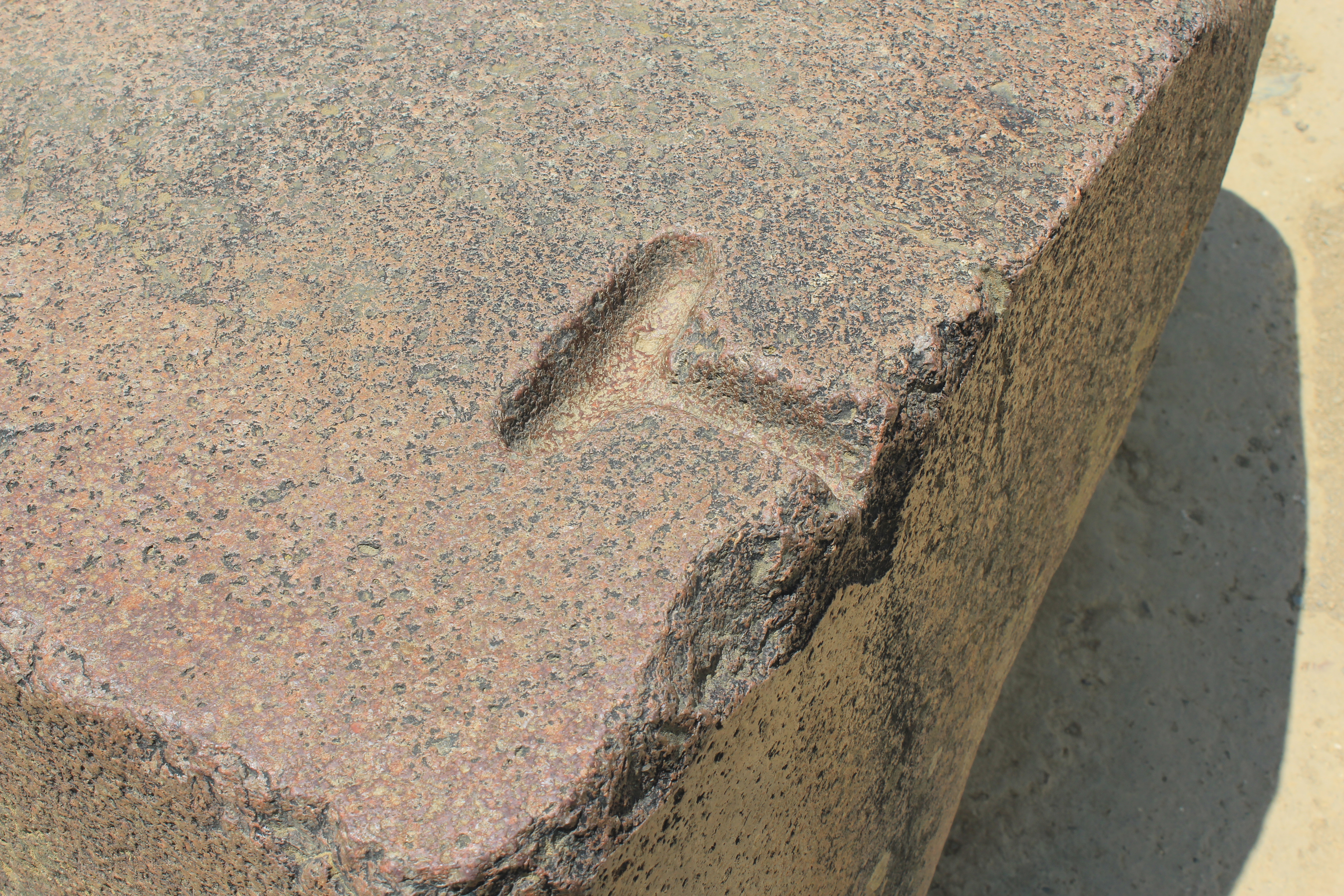
T-shaped sockets at Ollantaytambo that are similar to those found at Pumapunku

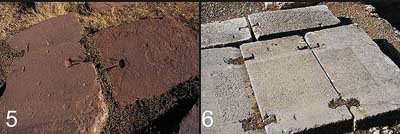
Comparison of the Tiwanaku cramp technique (left) with that in Delphi (right)

== Possible connection to Ollantaytambo ==
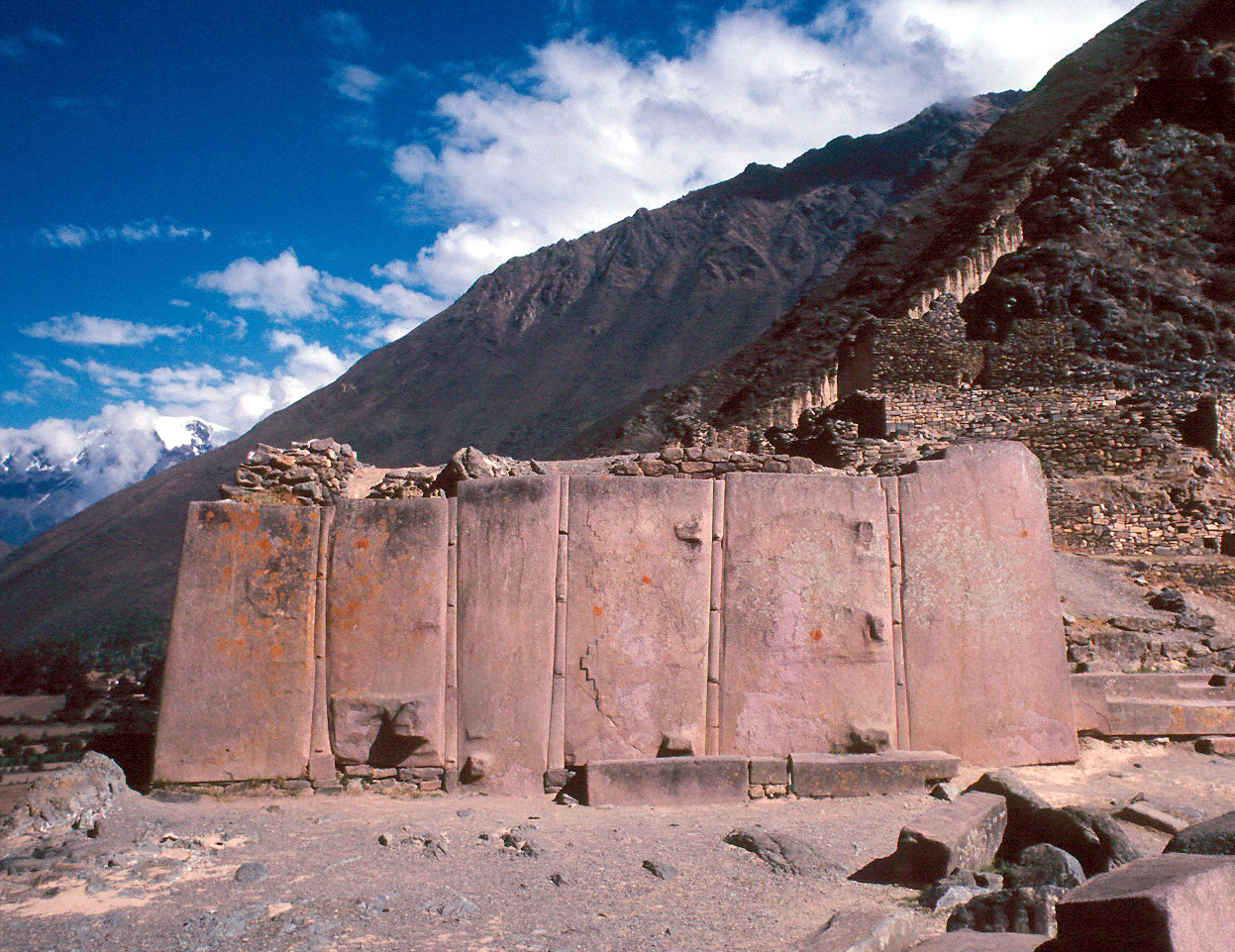
Wall of the six monoliths at Ollantaytambo.

The architectural historian Jean-Pierre Protzen from University of California, Berkeley states that in the past it often has been argued that among the buildings at Ollantaytambo the monumental structures (e. g. the Wall of the six monoliths) were the work of the earlier Tiwanaku culture and have been reused by the Incas:

An argument persists that the Wall of the six monoliths and the vanished structures from which the blocks have been recycled predate the Incas and were work of the earlier Tiahuanaco culture. Support for the argument is found in the step motif carved on the fourth monolith and the T-shape sockets cut into several blocks, both believed to be hallmarks of Tiahuanaco-style architecture. […] A variant of this argument is that Tiahuanacoid elements were brought to Ollantaytambo by […] stonemasons from Lake Titicaca. […] The only question here is why stonesmasons from Lake Titicaca should have remembered anything Tiahaunacoid when for several centuries nothing like it had been built. If anything remembers me of Tiahuanaco it is […] the T-shaped sockets and the regularly coursed masonry of strongly altered andesite. […] Many T-shaped sockets are indeed found at Tiahuanaco in particular at the site of Puma Punku […].

However, according to Protzen, in Ollantaytambo only T-shaped sockets are found, whereas in Tiwanaku cramp sockets of a wide range of shapes — L, T, double-T or ‡, U, Y, Z — and dimensions are found. Similarities between Ollantaytambo and Tiwanaku were also noticed by Heinrich Ubbelohde-Doering, Alphons Stübel and Max Uhle.

== Gateways of Pumapunku ==
=== Full-sized gateways ===
At least five gateways (and several blind miniature gateways) were once (or were intended to be) integrated into the Pumapunku monumental complex. The foundation platform of Pumapunku supported as many as eight andesite gateways. The fragments of five andesite gateways with similar characteristics to the Gateway of the Sun were found.

=== Miniature gateways ===
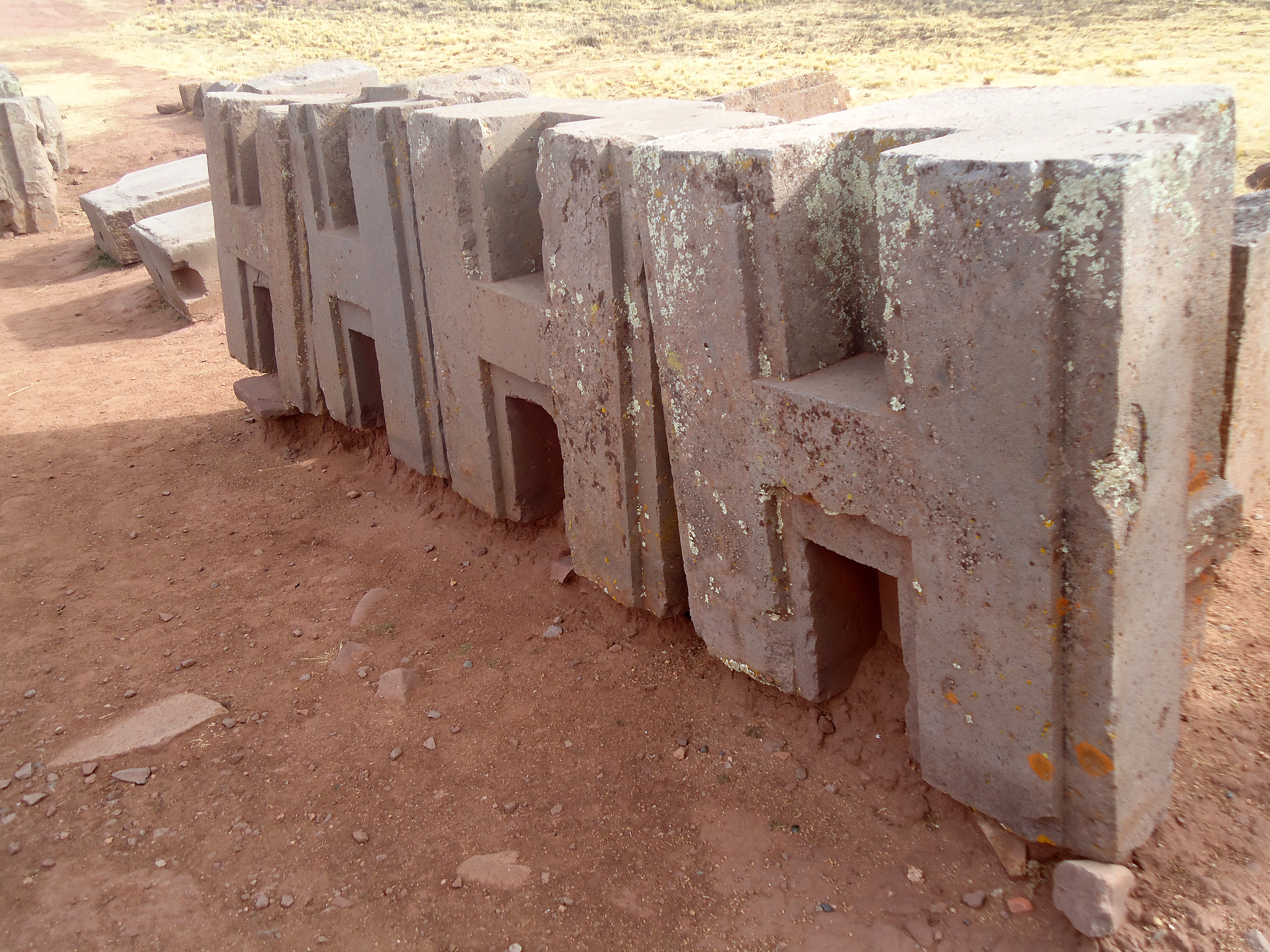
Some of the so-called "H-blocks" which were interconnected (or intended to interconnect) with other andesite blocks forming blind miniature gateways. What the gateways looked like is depicted in the monolith called "Escritorio del Inca", which is an accurate and reduced-scale model of a full-scale architectural form.

There also exist miniature gateways at Pumapunku which are perfect replicas of once standing monumental full-sized gateways. When reducing the full-sized monumental architecture to miniature architecture the Tiahuanacans applied a specific formula. There also exist replicas of larger monumental structures. For example it has been shown that the much-admired carved block known as the "Escritorio del Inca" is an accurate and reduced-scale model of full-scale architecture. Some of these "model stones" like "little Pumapunku" are not isolated stones but, rather, seem to fit in the context of other stones and stone fragments. According to Protzen and Nair the fact that many of these "model stones" were executed in multiple exemplars bespeaks mass production.

== Doubly curved lintels ==
At Pumapunku and other areals of Tiwanaku such as Kantatayita doubly curved lintels with complicated surfaces were found. Jean-Pierre Protzen and Stella Nair point out that the "steep parabolic curve" of the doubly curved lintels (like that of the Kantatayita lintel) would be difficult to replicate for modern stonemasons ("would tax any stonemason's skills today").

== Sculptures ==
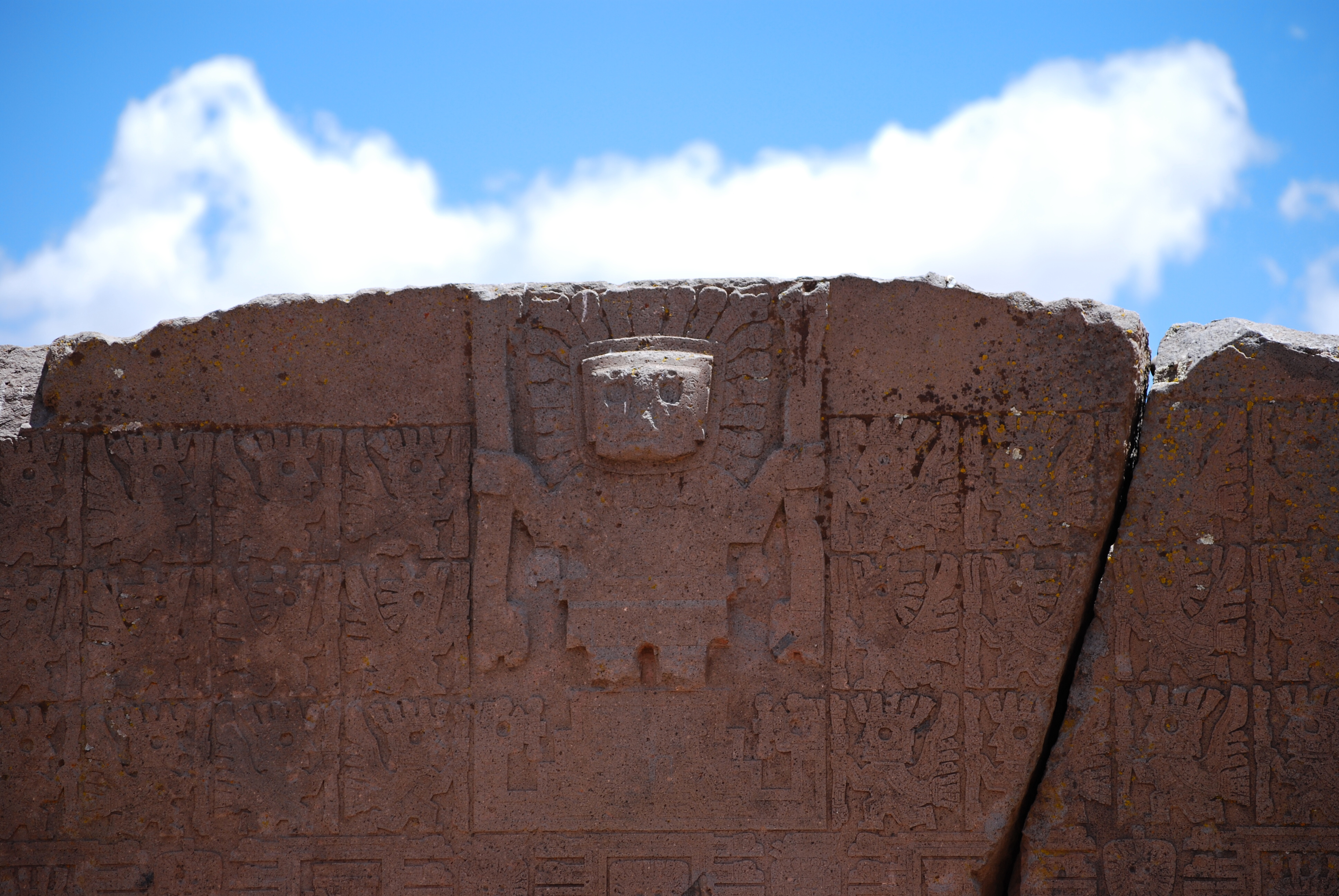
The front-facing figure of the gateway of the sun; most experts believe that the gateway of the sun once was integrated in the monumental structure of Pumapunku

There are at least two monoliths associated with the Pumapunku platform mound. One of these monoliths is the Pumapunku monolith (or Pumapunku stela). It was discovered west of the Pumapunku campus and first documented in photographs in 1876. There is evidence that like in the case of Akapana sculptures known as Chachapumas once were guarding the entrance to Pumapunku. Chachapumas usually were placed on andesite pedestals on either side of the entrance. These sculptures show fearsome traits of predatory animals, they crouch or kneel while clutching a human head in one hand and an axe in the other. Some authors believe that the Chachapumas demanded a "sacrifice" of humans when entering the monumental structures. Some authors believe, because of certain markings on stones found at Puma Punku, the Gate of the Sun was part of Puma Punku. According to Alan Kolata the terraced platform mound depicted on the gateway of the sun is actually a stylized depiction of Pumapunku. The backside of the gateway of the sun has patterns which can be found on the stone slabs and gates of Pumapunku. Therefore some assume that the gateway of the sun once formed the main entrance to Pumapunku.

== Roofs ==
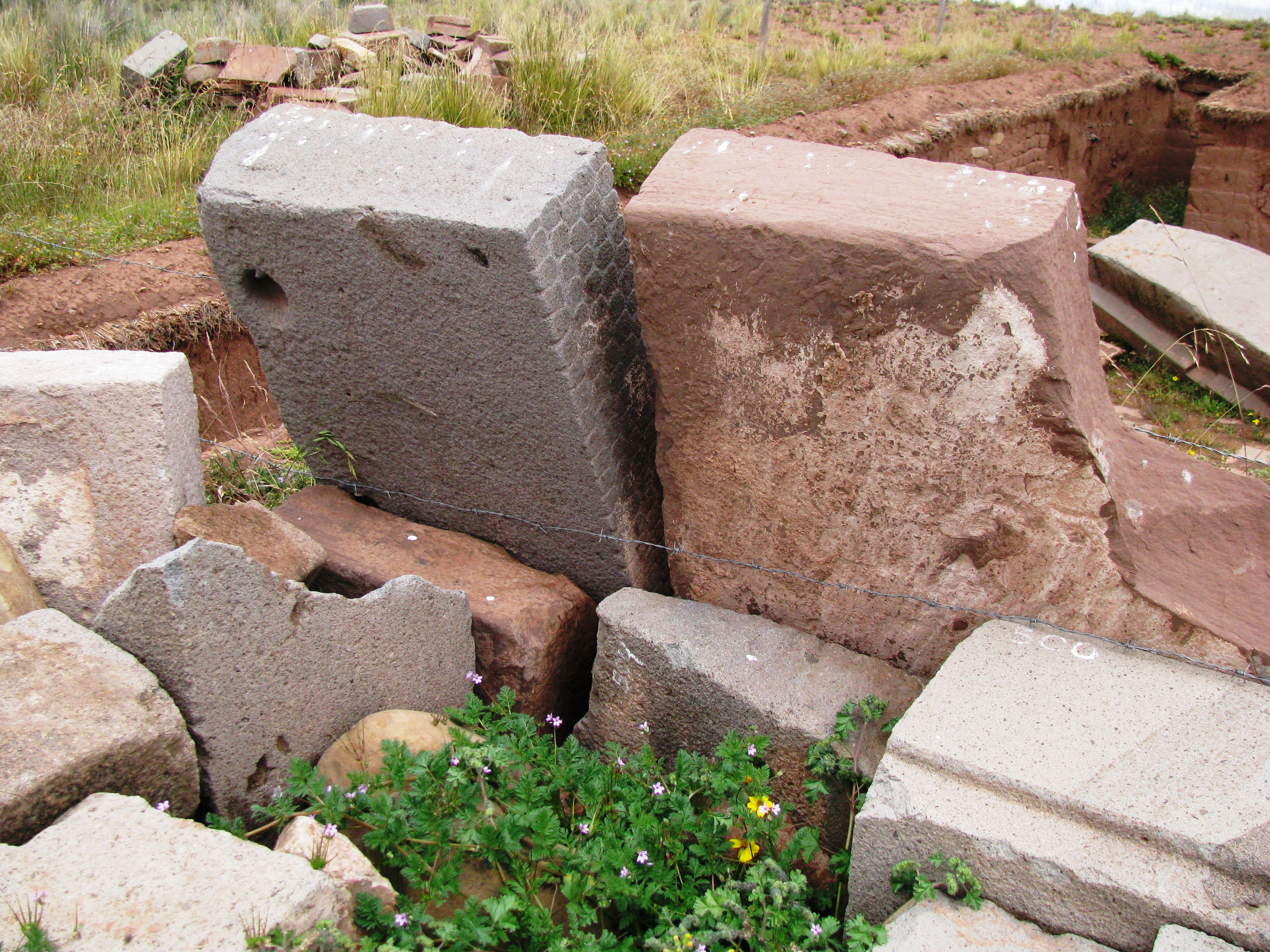
On the left tiny fragment of a large Totora-reed stone at Pumapunku

The roofs of the entrance to Pumapunku were most likely out of Totora-reed stones. At the west entrance of Pumapunku Totora-reed stones were found. Early visitors who saw standing architecture at Tiwanaku reported about stones which resemble "straw":

[…] [T]he roof of the hall, on the outside, looks like straw, although it is of stone. Because the Indians cover their houses with straw, and for this [room] to look like the others [houses], they dressed the stone and incised it so that it would appear like a cover of straw.

Large Totora-reed stones can be found in the museum at Tiwanaku.

== Atlantis and aliens enthusiasts ==
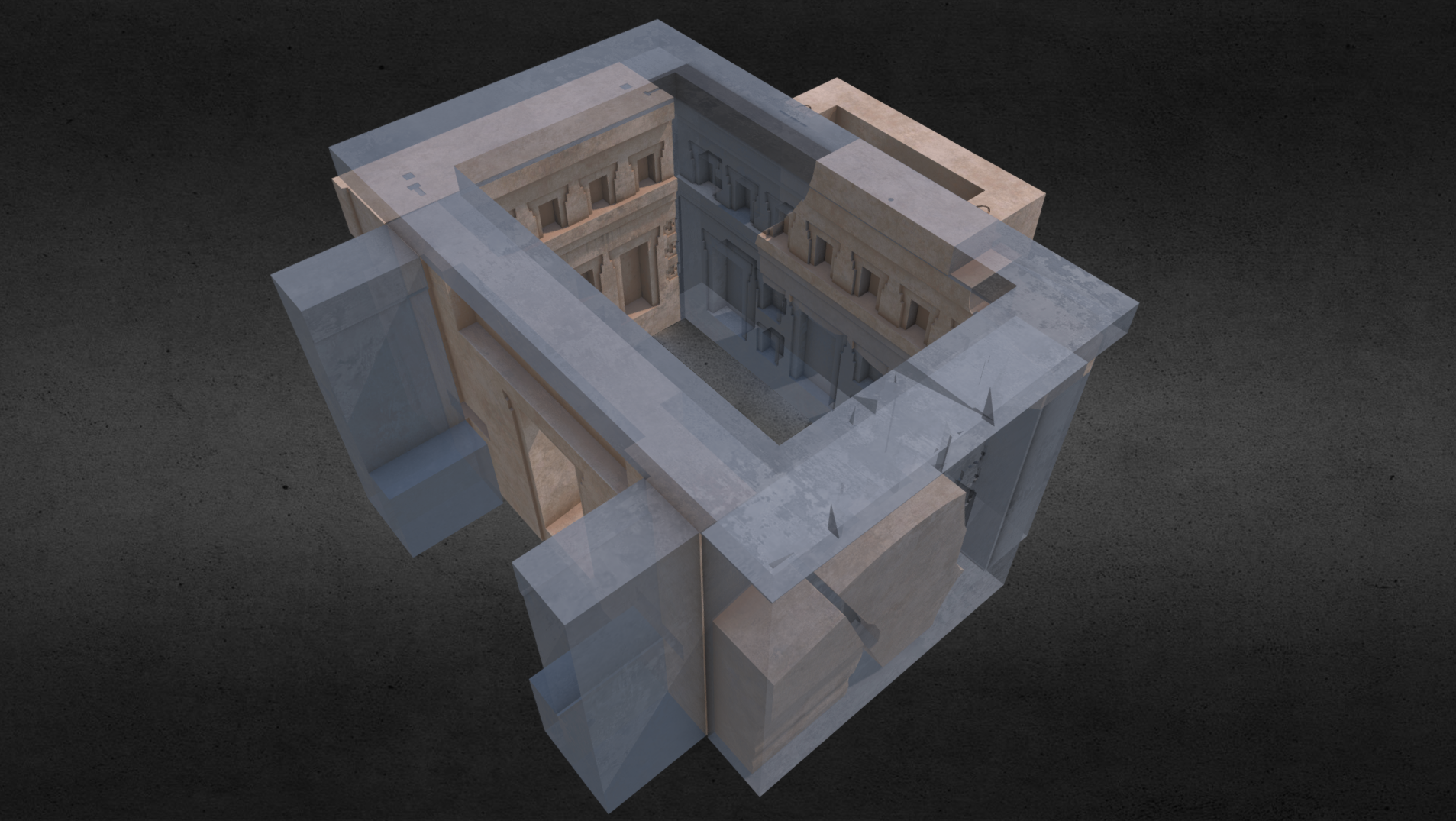
Virtual reconstruction of one of the four buildings of the Pumapunku monumental structure by Alexei Vranich. The reconstruction revealed that these kind of buildings are elaborate versions of buildings that were excavated by Christine Hastorf at the Chiripa site (550 BC–AD 100).

Pumapunku is a subject of pseudoscience theories about lost continents and extraterrestrial interventions. Thousands of websites and references refer to pseudoscientific theories put forward by enthusiasts of alien life-forms and Atlantis. The archeologist Jeb J. Card notes that Pumapunku is a fixture of books and television programs on alternative archeology and especially ancient aliens. According to Card, Atlantis and alien enthusiasts point to the fine-cut masonry and the location of Pumapunku in the high Altiplano as mysteries. The archeologist Alexei Vranich counters the idea held by some ancient alien enthusiasts that well-preserved local precursors of the monumental complex of Pumapunku have been found (some monumental structures at Pukara and Chiripa). In his view such discoveries are "a solid piece of evidence" against the claims by ancient alien enthusiasts that Pumapunku is an example of extraterrestrial technology, based in part on the idea that the form and design of the monumental complex of Pumapunku has no local precursors. The buildings at Chiripa (which are similar to buildings of Pumapunku) were identified as "storage bins" because impressions of baskets and remains of food were found. Vranich notes that generations of amateurs, the fringe element, and pseudo-archeologists claimed that the "apparent geometric perfection of Tiwanaku architecture" is a result of extraterrestrial intervention or of a lost super civilization. He instead attributed the ruins to the inhabitants of the Titicaca basin. In the 2019 issue of Public Archaeology, Franco D. Rossi of Johns Hopkins University criticizes that ancient alien theorists have called the Aymara "Stone Age people" who could not have built Pumapunku.

== Gallery ==
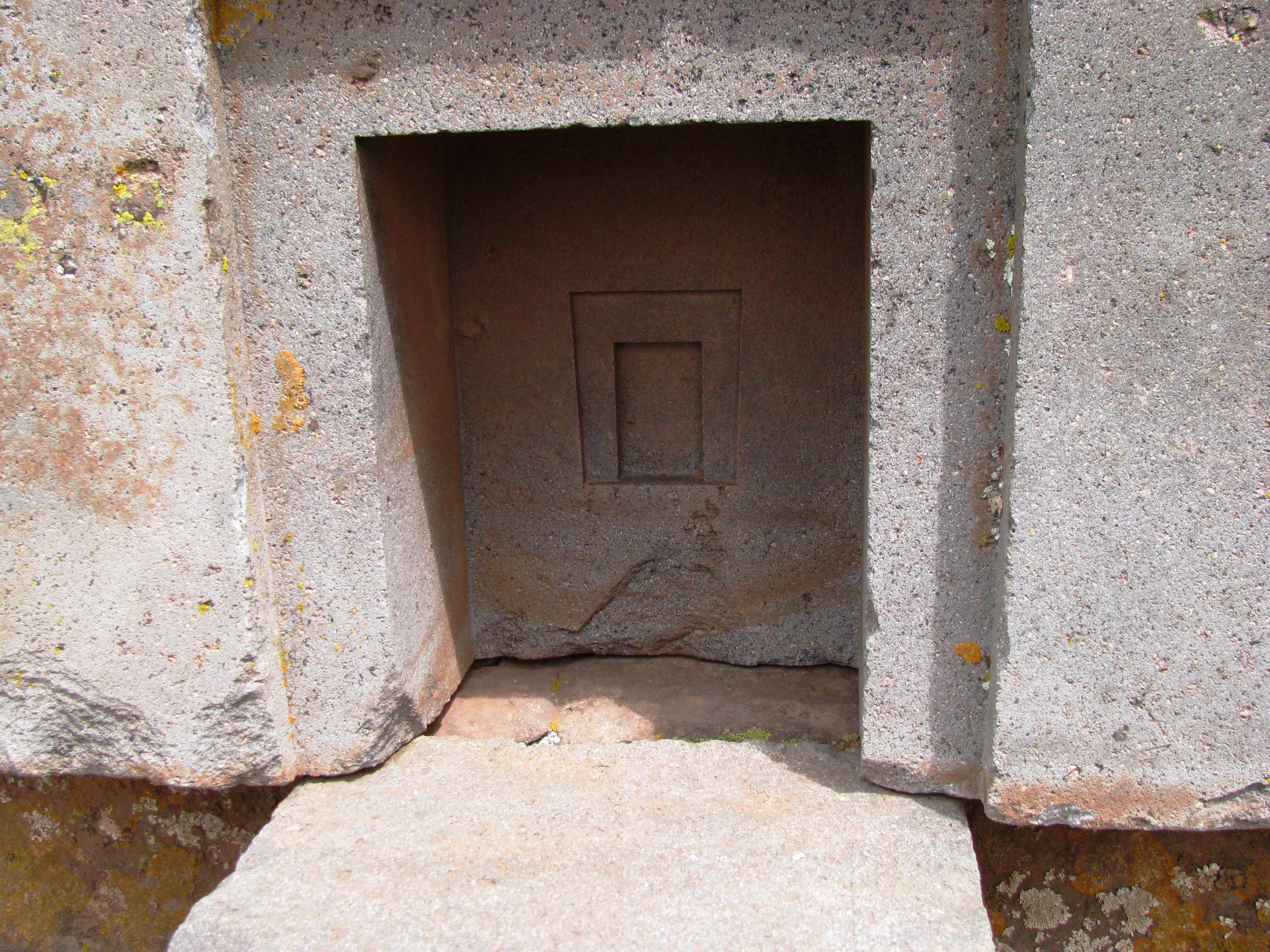
"Nested square" symbol inside one "H-block". Identical "nested square" symbols can be found on stone stelas in the museum at Pukara."

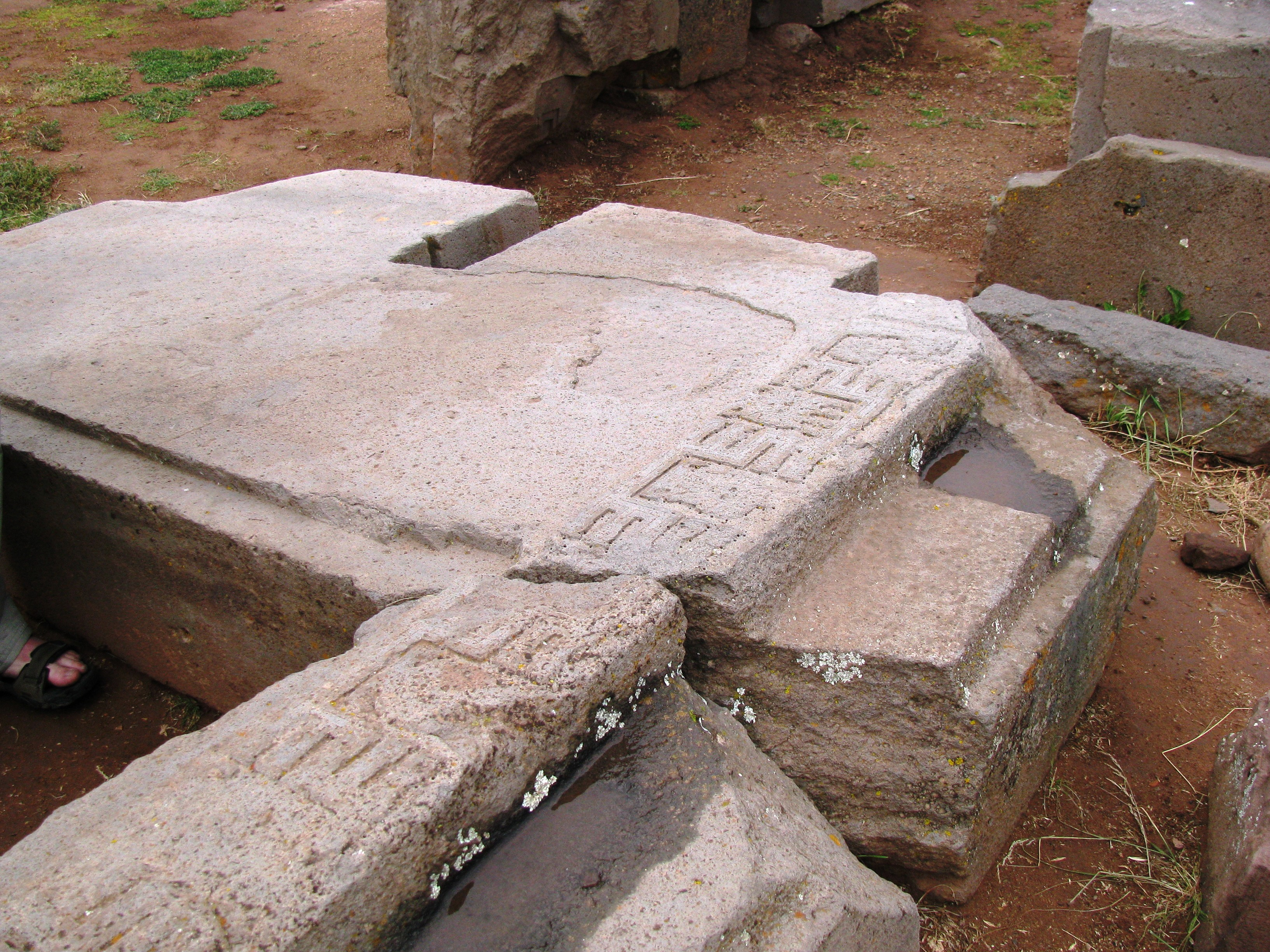
One gateway at Pumapunku with similar iconography to the Gateway of the Sun

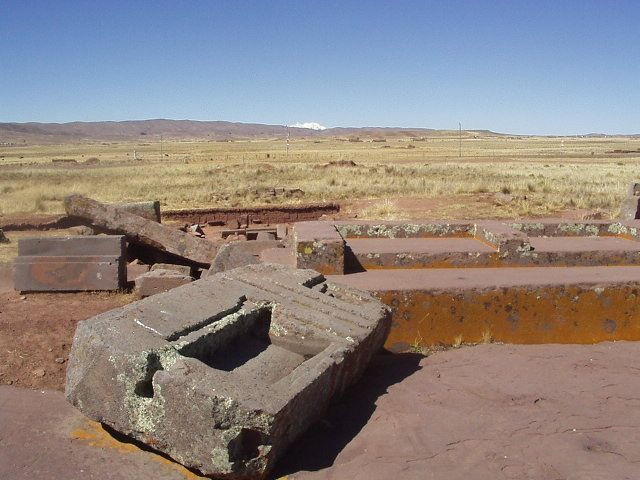
Fragment of one gateway at Pumapunku

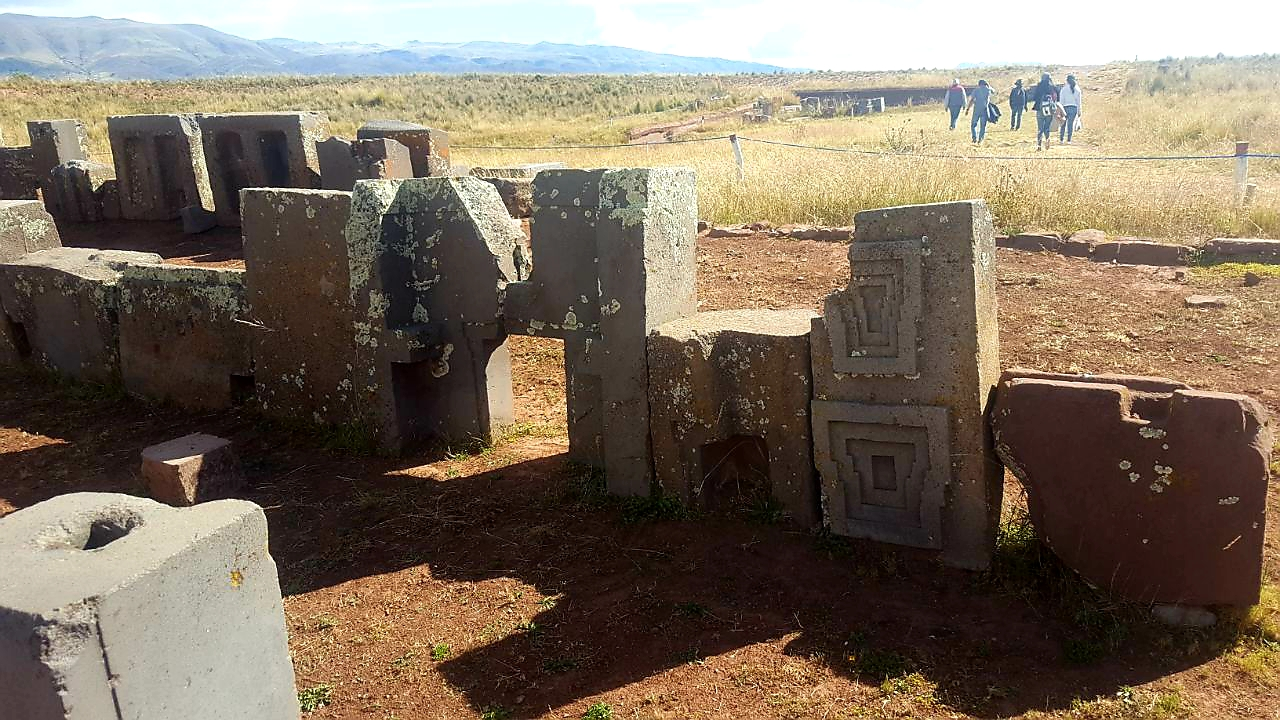
Ornamental stones at Pumapunku

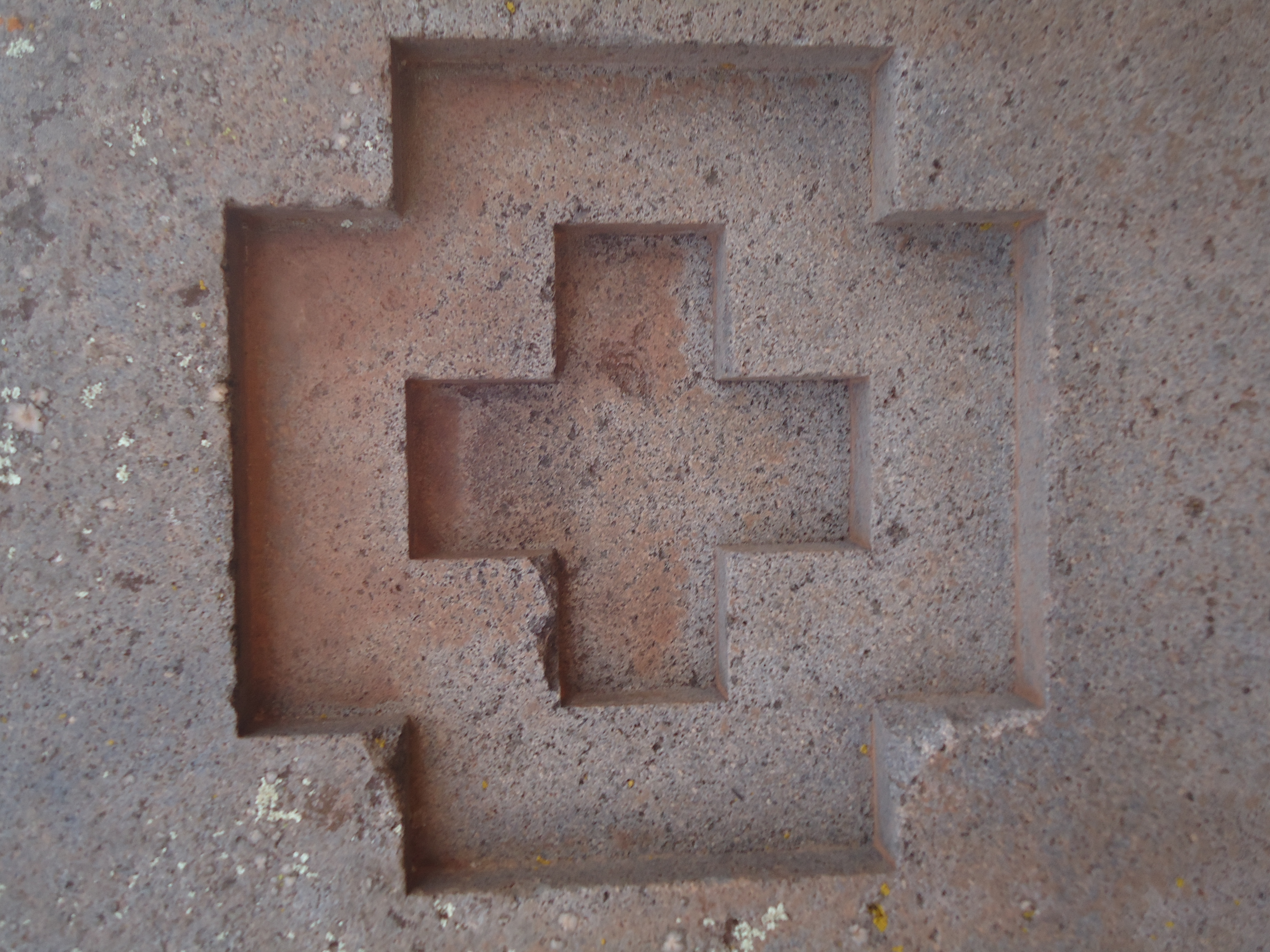
Detail of one of the andesite blocks

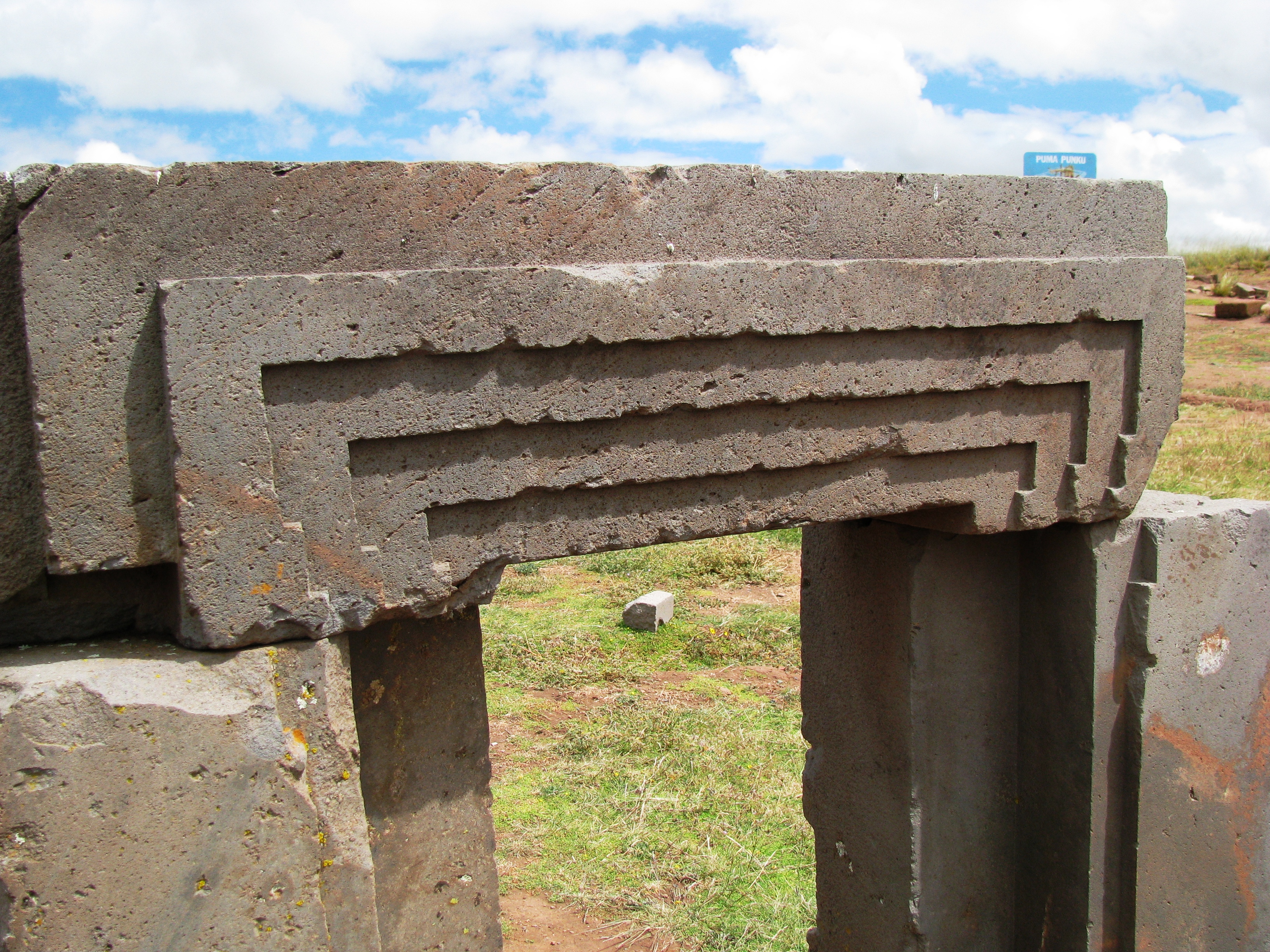
Nested structures which are typical for Pumapunku Style architecture

== Bibliography ==
- Isbell, William H. (2004). "Palaces and Politics in the Andean Middle Horizon". Palaces of the Ancient New World. Dumbarton Oaks Research Library and Collection. pp. 191–246. ISBN 9780884023418. Archived from the original on 2013-01-07.
- Protzen, Jean-Pierre; Nair, Stella (1997). "Who taught the Inca stonemasons their skills? A comparison of Tiahuanaco and Inca cut-stone masonry". Journal of the Society of Architectural Historians. 56 (2): 146–167. doi:10.2307/991281. JSTOR 991281.
- Protzen, Jean-Pierre; Nair, Stella (2000). "On Reconstructing Tiwanaku Architecture". Journal of the Society of Architectural Historians. 59 (3): 358–371. doi:10.2307/991648. JSTOR 991648.
- Protzen, Jean-Pierre; Nair, Stella (2002). "The Gateways of Tiwanaku. Symbols or passages?". Andean Archaeology II: Art, landscape and society. Springer. pp. 189–223.
- Protzen, Jean-Pierre; Nair, Stella (2013). The Stones of Tiahuanaco: A Study of Architecture and Construction. Monographs. Cotsen Institute of Archaeology Press at UCLA. doi:10.2307/j.ctvdmwwsq. ISBN 9781931745673. JSTOR j.ctvdmwwsq.
- Sanginés, Carlos Ponce (1970). Acerca de la procedencia del material lítico de los monumentos de Tiwanaku. Academia Nacional de Ciencias de Bolivia. Academia Nacional de Ciencias de Bolivia.
- Stübel, Alphons; Uhle, Max (1892). Die Ruinenstätte von Tiahuanaco im Hochlande des alten Peru: eine kulturegeschichtliche Studie (in German). Breslau. pp. 25–28. doi:10.11588/diglit.21775.
- Vranich, Alexei (1999). Interpreting the meaning of ritual spaces: the temple complex of Pumapunku, Tiwanaku, Bolivia (Thesis). University of Pennsylvania.
- Vranich, Alexei (2006). "The construction and reconstruction of ritual space at Tiwanaku, Bolivia (AD 500–1000)". Journal of Field Archaeology. 31 (2): 121–136. doi:10.1179/009346906791071990. S2CID 161279421.
- Vranich, Alexei; Levine, Abigail R. (2013). "A Radiocarbon Chronology of the Pumapunku Complex and a Reassessment of the Development of Tiwanaku, Bolivia". Advances in Titicaca Basin Archaeology-2. Monographs. Cotsen Institute of Archaeology Press at UCLA. pp. 127–146. ISBN 9781950446117. JSTOR j.ctvdjrqk5.17.
- Vranich, Alexei (2018). "Reconstructing ancient architecture at Tiwanaku, Bolivia: the potential and promise of 3D printing". Heritage Science. 6 65: 1–20. doi:10.1186/s40494-018-0231-0.
