= Edmund Kiss =

German writer and pseudo-archaeologist (1886–1960)

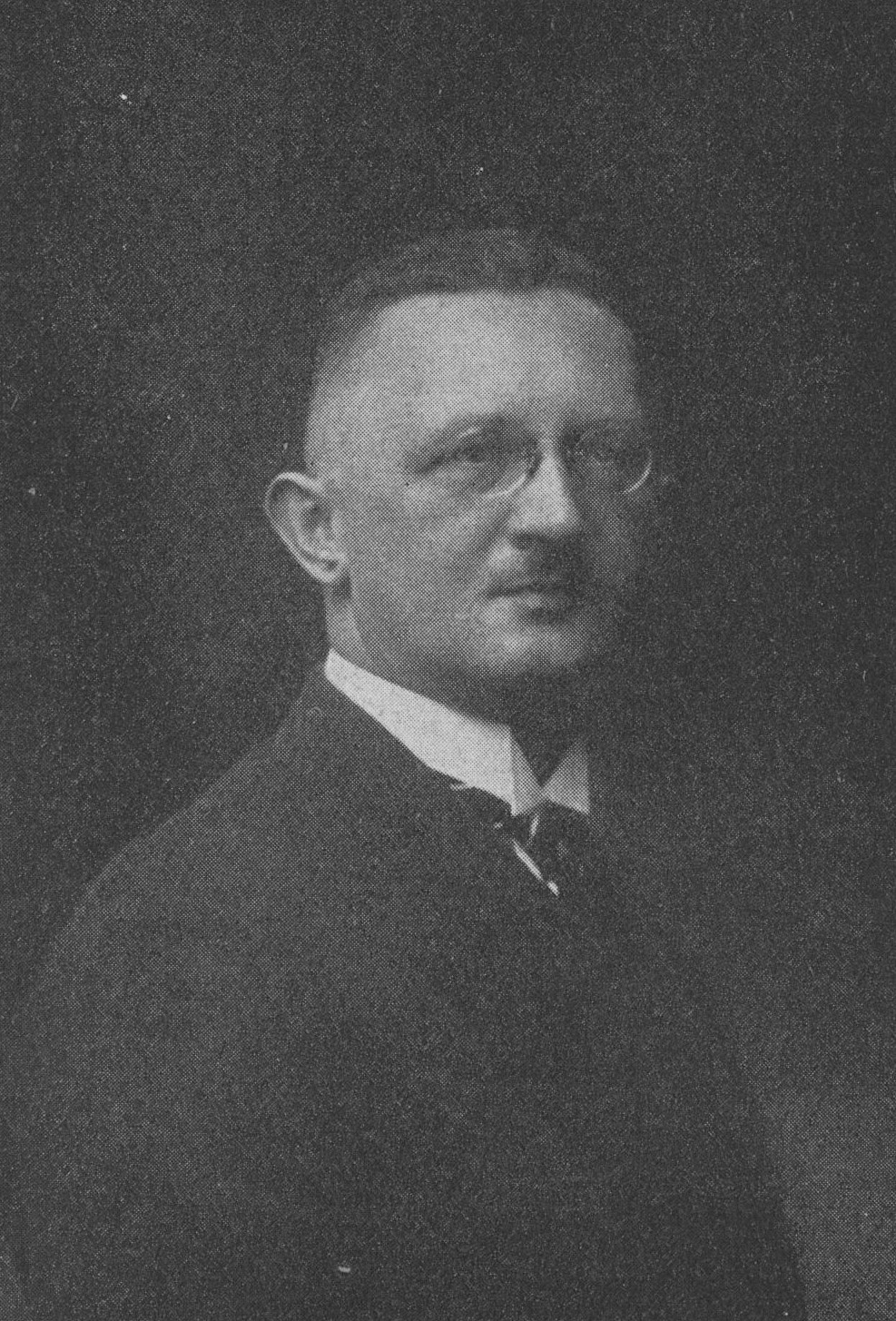
Image of Edmund Kiss (1886 – 1960).

Edmund Kiss (1886 – 1960) was a German pseudo-archaeologist and author who is best known for his books about the ancient settlement of Tiwanaku in the Andes mountains of Bolivia and its supposed Nordic racial origins.

== Early life and writings ==
Edmund Kiss was born in Germany in 1886 and later studied architecture. He claimed to have also studied archaeology, but there is no evidence that this is true. He was a soldier during the First World War. After the Treaty of Versailles, he started writing a series of novels of adventure fiction in the prestigious German collection Der Gute Kamerad and with other publishing houses. He also wrote non-fiction works that adhered to the tenets of pseudo-scientist Hanns Hörbiger. In the 1920s and early 1930s, he worked as a municipal officer responsible for the construction of public buildings.

In the 1920s, Edmund Kiss started writing his first books on alternative archeology and ancient mysticism. In his book entitled The Last Queen of Atlantis (Die letzte Königin von Atlantis), he equated the mythical northern land Thule to the origins of humanity. According to Kiss 'The inhabitants of Northern Atlantis were led by their leader Baldur Wieborg, a native of the mythical Thule who migrated all across the world'. He later described the return journey of the Nordic Thulians to their mythical homeland in The Swans of Thule.

== Tiwanaku and Welteislehre ==
Edmund Kiss was a follower of the pseudo-science Welteislehre (World-Ice Theory). Welteislehre was a pseudo-scientific hypothesis created by Hanns Hörbiger and Philipp Johann Heinrich Fauth during the 1890s. Welteislehre suggests that the Earth and all other cosmic planetary bodies were made out of ice. One of the claims made in Hörbiger's book Glacial-Kosmogonie was that the Earth once had six satellite moons and that sometime in the ancient past, five of these moons were destroyed. According to Hörbiger, this event would have caused global flooding and the formation of continent-spanning glaciers. According to Hörbiger, flora and fauna could only survive at high altitudes such as those found in the Himalayas and the Andes. Edmund Kiss was attracted by the claim of global ice and wanted to explore the Andes for evidence to prove Hörbiger's theory.

In 1927, Kiss made contact with an Austrian writer and amateur archaeologist Arthur Posnansky. Posnansky informed Kiss about the ruins of Tiwanaku. Posnansky had been undertaking research at Tiwanaku since the early 1900s and suggested that the temples built on the site predated the traditionally accepted date of 200 C.E. and were instead constructed around 17,000 B.C.E. Posnansky used pseudo-scientific astronomical calculations on one of the walls at the site to obtain this date.

In 1928, Kiss used a 20,000 Mark reward he received in a writing contest to fund an expedition to Tiwanaku. Kiss generally agreed with Posnansky's findings and came to the conclusion that the ruins were not Andean in origin. These findings were based on Kiss's personal opinion that the ruins were "European" in design. He later stated in a letter translated by Heather Pringle, "The works of art and the architectural style of the prehistoric city are certainly not of Indian style…Rather they are probably the creations of Nordic men who arrived in the Andean Highlands as representatives of a special civilization.". Kiss theorized that the original builders of Tiwanaku were Nordic peoples who had begun construction of Tiwanaku almost one million years ago. Kiss claimed that the same Nordic race that he claimed built Tiwanaku had been the inhabitants of the mythical lost continent of Atlantis.

Kiss's research was discussed in several publications that appeared after his 1928 expedition to Tiwanaku, in 1930, published an article for the architecture magazine Zeitschrift für Bauwesen, titled Die Rekonstruktion des Mausoleums Puma Punku und der Sonnenwarte Kalasasaya in Tihuanaku in Bolivien. From 1930-1933 Kiss, published Das Gläserne Meer, Die Letzte Königin von Atlantis, and Frühling in Atlantis. These novels were presented as historical fiction and were based on his archaeological theories. The novels portray the Atlanteans as Nordic Aryans with access to advanced technology and the builders of Tiwanaku. Kiss did not publish a comprehensive work detailing his findings at Tiwanaku until 1937, when he published Das Sonnentor von Tihuanaku und Hörbiger's Welteislehre. The title makes a reference to the Gateway of the Sun, a monolithic carved gateway located at Tiwanaku. The Gateway of the Sun is known for its intricate carvings, with the central figure known as the front-facing figure or Staff God. One of Kiss's theories for the Gateway of the Sun was that the monolith was a celestial calendar, according to Heather Pringle. "He felt certain he could see symbols for twelve months of the year, each possessing either twenty-four or twenty-five days…each of the days had thirty hours." Kiss claimed about a notable artifact from the site found at Kalasasaya that it resembles a Nordic man.

== Connections to Nazism ==
Edmund Kiss, along with other leading Nazis such as Heinrich Himmler, was influenced by Völkisch ideology for most of his writing career. His adherence to the Welteislehre further strengthens his connection due to its popularity within the Völkisch movement. Canadian author Heather Pringle has noted Kiss' lack of concern for conventional scientific theory and the way in which his ideas 'greatly appealed to right-wing politics extremists who were always looking for ways of Germanizing science and junking anything that smacked of "Judaism" science'. According to Pringle, mainstream scientists in America and Great Britain at the time described Kiss as a 'complete idiot.'

The publishing of Das Sonnentor von Tihuanaku und Hörbiger's Welteislehre brought Kiss to the attention of Heinrich Himmler. Himmler was so enthralled with Kiss's theories that he purchased a leather-bound copy of ‘’Das Sonnentor von Tihuanaku und Hörbiger's Welteislehre’’ as a Christmas present for Adolf Hitler. Kiss's novel also included a large collection of reconstructive illustrations he created of Tiwanaku. These illustrations drew more from Kiss's personal fantasies than from actual archaeological work. Furthermore, his reconstructions show signs that they were also influenced by Nazi monumental architecture.

By 1939, Kiss had requested the SS-Ahnenerbe to fund another expedition to Tiwanaku. The proposed expedition would've been one of the most technical of the time, including aerial and underwater photography alongside the excavations. The Ahnenerbe's director Wolfram Sievers concluded the cost for the expedition would've come to around 100,000 Reichsmarks. The expedition was delayed indefinitely following the German invasion of Poland. The expedition was canceled in 1941.

Following the German declaration of war in 1939, Edmund Kiss was called in to serve as a Hauptsturmführer in the Waffen-SS.

Edmund Kiss was captured in 1945. In 1948, a de-nazification trial classified him as a Mitläufer (fellow-traveller). He was fined 501 Reichsmarks.

== Later life ==
Following his trial, he retired in order to continue writing. In the 1950s, he wrote two more books on mysticism. One of these books was entitled Some comments on Critias, which was a reanalysis of the location of Atlantis. In 1959, he published an article titled An Early Account of Tiahuanaco for the journal New World Antiquity.

Edmund Kiss died in 1960.

== Books ==
- Das gläserne Meer. Leipzig: Koehler & Amelang, 1930.
- Die letzte Königin von Atlantis. Leipzig: Koehler & Amelang, 1931.
- Frühling in Atlantis. Leipzig: Koehler & Amelang, 1933.
- Das Sonnentor von Tihuanaku und Hörbigers Welteislehre. Leipzig: Koehler & Amelang, 1937.

== Literature ==
- Michael H. Kater, Das Ahnenerbe der SS 1935–1945. Ein Beitrag zur Kulturpolitik des Dritten Reiches. Stuttgart 1974 (in German)
- Peter Mierau, Nationalsozialistische Expeditionspolitik. Die deutschen Asienexpeditionen. Munich 2005 (in German)
