= Gate of the Sun =

Bolivian monolith

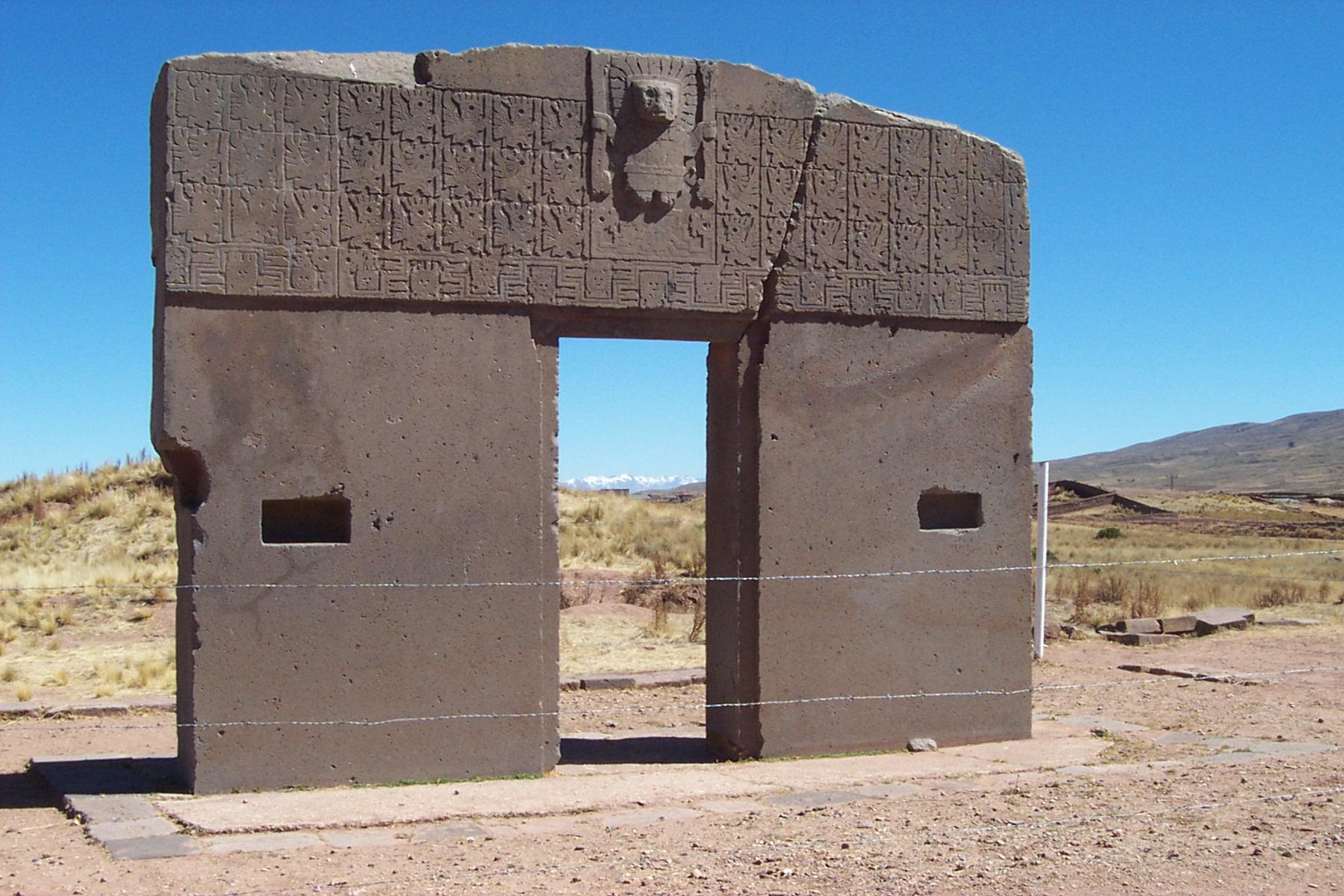
- The Gate of the Sun in 2009
- Interactive map of Gate of the Sun
- Location: Tiwanaku, La Paz Department, Bolivia
- Coordinates: 16.5544°S 68.6741°W
- Builder: Tiwanaku culture
- Type: Monolithic gateway
- Material: Stone (single block)
- Width: 13 ft (4.0 m)
- Height: 9.8 ft (3.0 m)
- Weight: 10 tons

The Gate of the Sun, also known as the Gateway of the Sun (in older literature simply called "(great) monolithic Gateway of Ak-kapana"), is a monolithic gateway at the site of Tiahuanaco, built by the Tiwanaku culture, an Andean civilization of Bolivia that thrived around Lake Titicaca in the Andes of western South America around AD 500–950.

Tiwanaku is located near Lake Titicaca at about 12,549.2 ft (3,825.0 m) above sea level near La Paz, Bolivia. The Gate of the Sun is approximately 9.8 ft (3.0 m) tall and 13 ft (4.0 m) wide, and was carved from a single piece of stone. Its weight is estimated to be 10 tons. When rediscovered by European explorers in the mid-19th century, the megalith was lying horizontally and had a large crack through it. It presently stands in the location where it was found, although it is believed that this is not its original site, which remains uncertain. Antigüedades peruanas (1851) uses an engraving of the gateway as the frontispiece to its folio.

Some elements of Tiwanaku iconography spread throughout Peru and parts of Bolivia. Although there have been various modern interpretations of the inscriptions found on the object, the carvings that decorate the gate are believed to possess astronomical or astrological significance and may have served a calendrical purpose. In addition, scholars suggest that the design below the central figure is meant to represent celestial cycles. Being a later monument to the site in which it stands, the Gateway of the Sun could have also represented a transition from lunar religion to a solar religion based on its positioning to the sun to the West.

== Figures ==
The frieze of the Gateway's front-side shows SAIS ("Southern Andean Iconographic Series") iconography. The figures and ornaments in the peripheral sections which do not show sharp lines like those of the central section were added later. It shows 48 (originally 30) subsidiary figures often called "attendants". There are 32 (originally 20) attendants with human heads and 16 (originally 10) anthropomorphic figures with avian heads. All run towards the central motif: a human or human-like figure in Staff God pose (a religious Andean icon) whose head is surrounded by 24 linear "rays", thought by some to represent rays of the Sun. However, interpretations other than "rays of the sun" are possible. The vertical attribute that the central figure is holding in its left hand is a stylized spear-thrower. Some historians and archaeologists suggested that the central figure could be the Inca god Viracocha or the Aymara weather god Thunupa. Others think that it is possible that weaponry may point to individuals of a non-supernatural nature. The spatial organization of Tiwanaku "Staff Gods" may indicate that the personages represent ritual practitioners.

Scholars have drawn comparisons between the Inca and Tiwanaku icons as evidence of the influence Tiwanaku had on Inca mythology and iconography.

== Pseudoarchaeology ==
Among the early investigators of the Gate of the Sun were Arthur Posnansky and Edmund Kiss, who each interpreted this monument in the context of erroneous theories of an early contact with "Nordic Aryans". Their interpretations lacked modern data and methods and are now regarded as pseudoarchaeology.

== Historical depictions ==
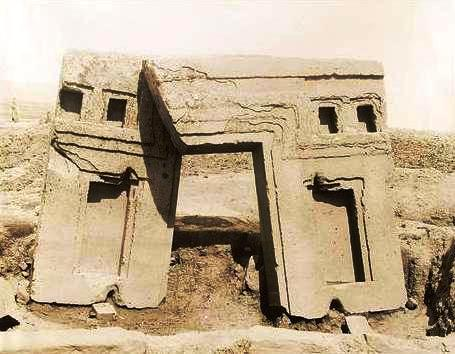
Gate of the Sun, rear view (1903)

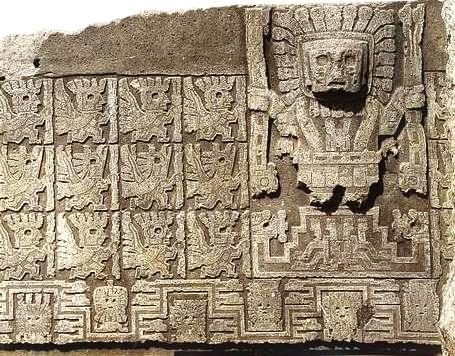
Detail of the Gate of the Sun (1903)

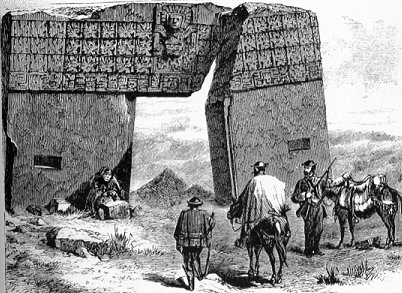
Depiction by Ephraim Squier in 1877. The scale is exaggerated in this drawing.
