= Unu Pachakuti =

Mythical deluge within Inca mythology

In Inca mythology, Unu Pachakuti is the name of a flood that Viracocha caused to destroy the people around Lake Titicaca, saving two to bring civilization to the rest of the world.

The process of destruction is linked with a new construction. It has a very deep meaning in the language and traditions. Some people would translate it as "revolution" of the world.

"The Inca’s supreme being and creator god, Con Tici (Kon Tiki) Viracocha, first created a race of giants, but they were unruly, so he destroyed them in a mighty flood and turned them to stone. Following the deluge, he created human beings from smaller stones. "In other versions of this story, the impious race is the pre-Inca civilization of the Tiahuanaco Americans about Lake Titicaca, the large high lake in the Andes. Viracocha drowns them and spares two, a man and a woman, to start the human race anew. Some versions of the Unu Pachakuti have the surviving man and woman floating to Lake Titicaca in a wooden box."

== See also ==
- Flood
- Flood myth
- Inca mythology
- Pachakutic
- Viracocha
