= Pachakutic =

Concept associated with pre-Columbian Andean cultures

Pachakutic, which means "Earth changer" in Quechua, is originally a concept associated with pre-Columbian Andean cultures, meaning a change in the sun or a movement of the Earth which will bring a new era. In its original context, it was associated with the type of creation myth found in much of the pre-Columbian Americas in which the present World had undergone several previous cycles of creation and renewal, and the present age was likewise part of such a great cycle; pachakutic referred to the completion of these cycles and the coming of a new era.

The concept has been adopted in recent times by certain political movements in South America, particularly those seeking to advance indigenous peoples' rights. In this context it signifies the beginning of a new cycle and the desire for substantive change in the political environment — or pachakamac, "turning the world upside-down".

The Movimiento de Unidad Plurinacional Pachakutik – Nuevo País (Pachakutic Plurinational Unity Movement – New Country), an Ecuadorian political party backed by the indigenous communities, has adopted the word and its associated symbolism as its standard.

== See also ==
- Unu Pachakuti
