= Staff God =

Religious icon in the Andes

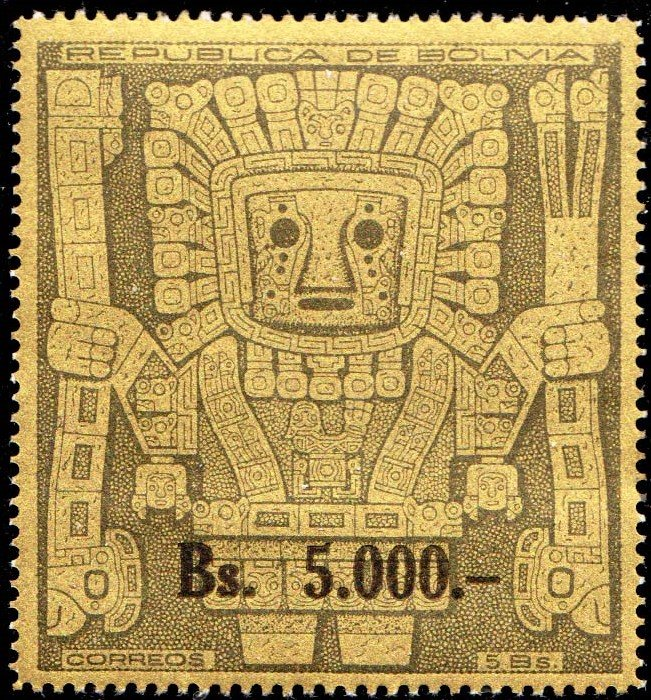
Stamp of the Staff God from the Gate of the Sun in Tiwanaku, Bolivia. A stylized vilca tree which is terminating in circular seed pods is sprouting from the head of the figure. The human figure holds a spearthrower with an avian hook in its right hand.

In "Southern Andean Iconographic Series" the Staff God pose is a religious icon and a standardized pose reminiscent in its way of the standardized poses in Byzantine art. The pose shows a front-facing human or human-like figure with vertical attributes, one in each hand. There is no uniform representation of a "Staff God". Dozens of variations of "Staff Gods" exist. Some scholars think that some of these personages are possible depictions of Viracocha or Thunupa (the Aymara weather god). However, there is little evidence to support the idea that these front-facing figures do represent deities. Some researchers point to their attributes and spatial organization which seem to indicate that they are ritual practitioners. Some attributes in their hands were identified as Qirus (Andean ritual cups), Snuff trays (used in ceremonial contexts) and Spear-throwers. At the Wari site of Conchopata a vessel was found which shows a Staff God in which the "rays" can be interpreted as a Anadenanthera colubrina tree sprouting from its head whereas the circular elements do represent its seed pods.

The oldest known depiction of a Staff God was found in 2003 on some broken gourd fragments in a burial site in the Pativilca River Valley (Norte Chico region) and carbon dated to 2250 BCE. This makes it the oldest religious icon to be found in the Americas.

There are scholars who maintain that the Wari-Tiwanaku Staff God is the forerunner of the Incan principal gods, Sun, Moon, and Thunder. It served as the primary religious icon of the entire Peruvian Andes, particularly during the Early Horizon (900-200 BC) and beyond. The worship of Staff Gods spread to the Central Andes during the Middle Horizon (600-1000 CE) This is supported by excavated Middle Horizon artifacts that resembled the Staff-God.

== Representations and iconography ==
The staff god was a basic iconography shared by the cultures of pre-Columbian Peru, particularly those occupying the northern coast and the southern highlands. This is seen in the stylistic uniformity of the icons and representations, which suggested widespread adherence.

There were varying depictions of the Staff-God among these Andean cultures. However, it was often portrayed as a deity in apotheosis, with hands always holding instruments of power. For instance, an artifact found at Chavin de Huantar showed the deity holding a Spondylus and Strombus shells, which were female and male symbols, respectively. This representation indicated how the Staff-God wielded authority to maintain social harmony and the Andean ideal of gender complementarity. Another Early Horizon sculpted stone, the Raimondi Stele, is perhaps the most popular representation and depicted the Staff-God as a sky or lightning god plunging down to earth.

Representations of the southern highland staff god did not only carry motifs but were also presented with accompanying consorts in the form of deities painted on textiles used to decorate temple walls or ceramic vessels.

The Staff God has one of the most important iconographical elements in central Andean archaeology and this is prominent in both portable and fixed art using different media such as stone, textile, and ceramic. A form of the staff god, for example, takes a central role in the Sun Gate of the Tiwanaku culture, a single-stone monolith. Tunics and ceramics from both the Tiwanaku and Wari cultures of the Middle Horizon period showcase a similar god. Another example is the giant offering jars found at Qunchupata. They were painted with the Staff-God's image, one that bears resemblance to the god's depiction at the back of the Tiwanaku's Ponce Monolith.

== Gallery ==
Staff God motif

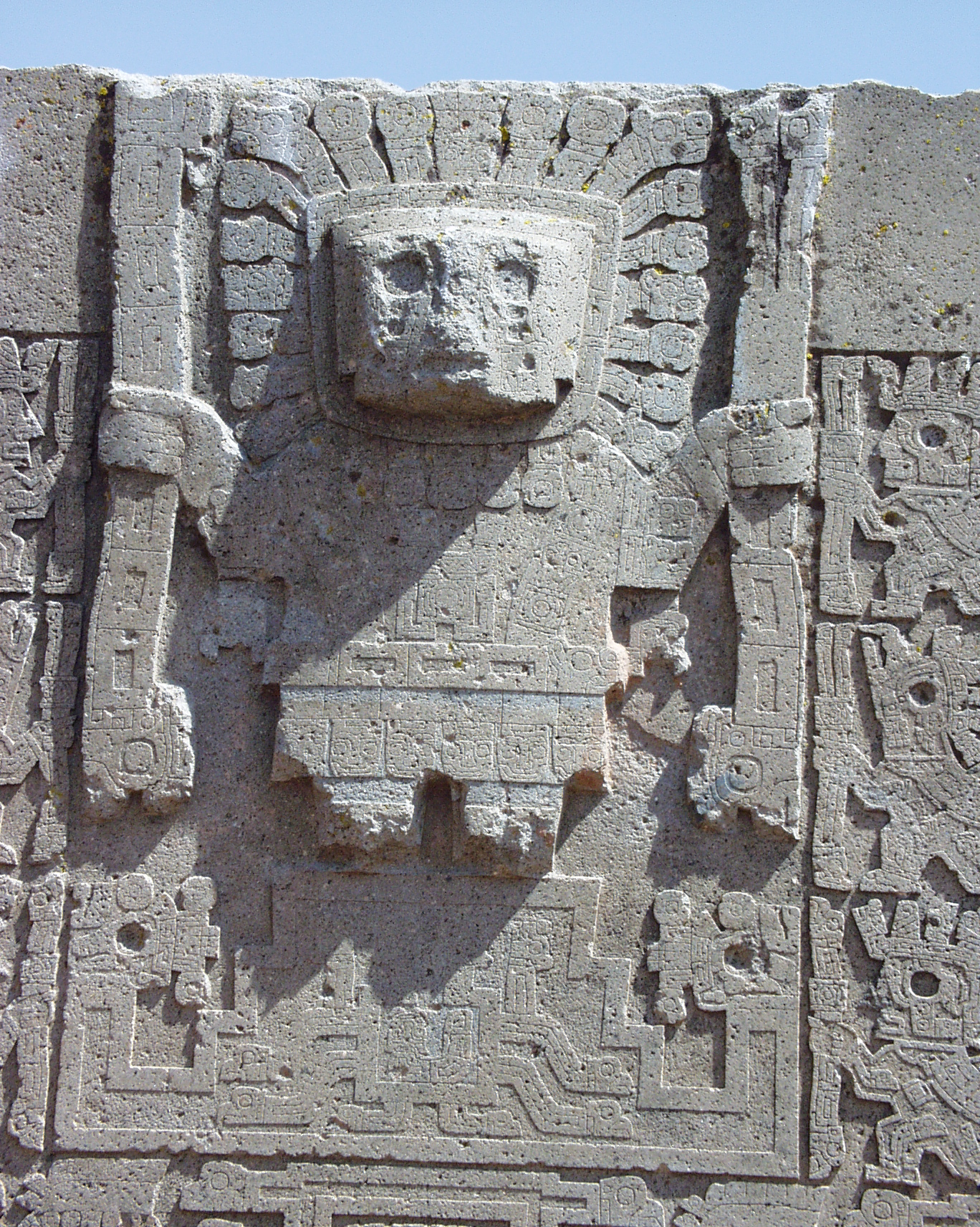
The front-facing figure of the Gate of the Sun

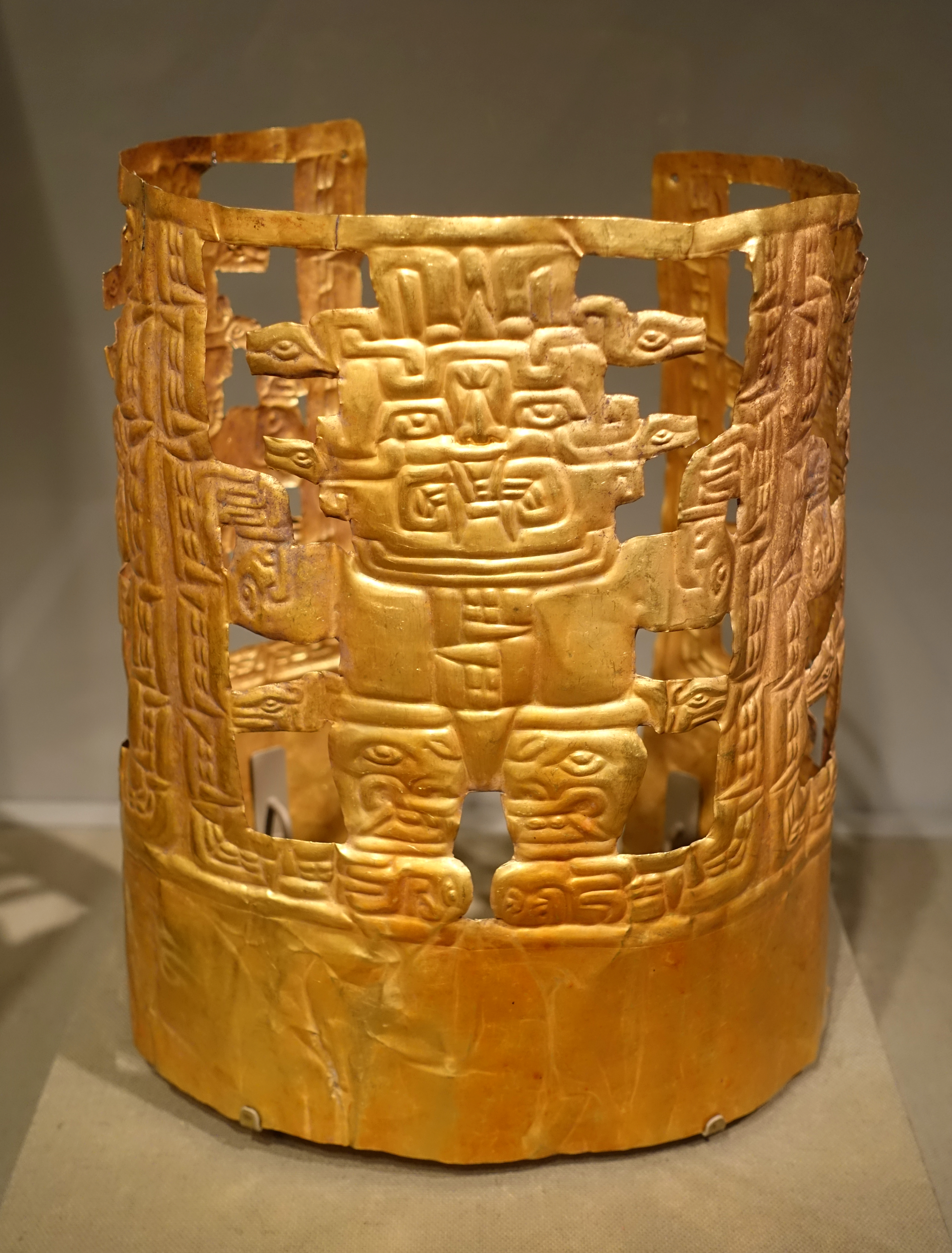
Staff God on a golden Chavín crown

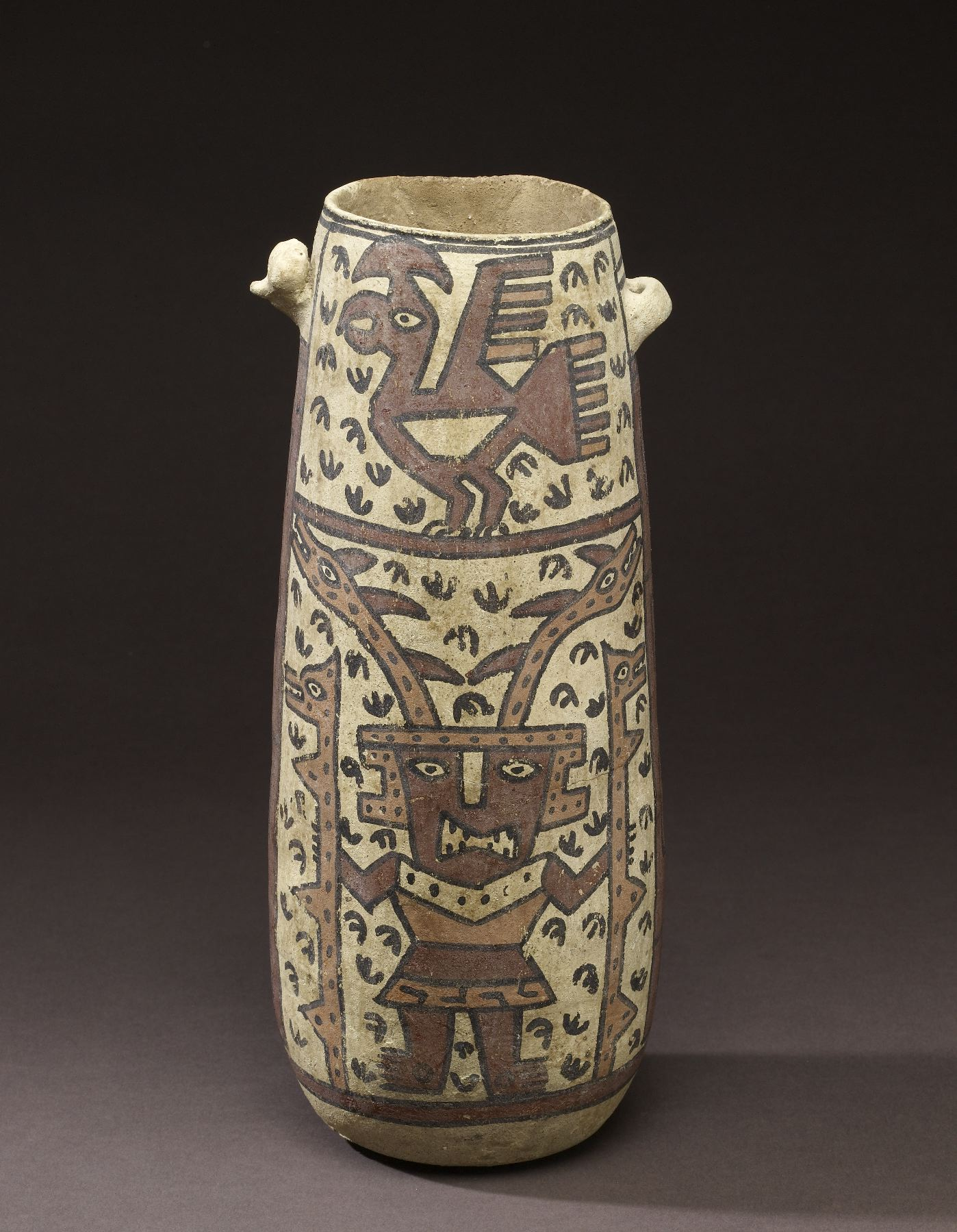
Figure in a Staff God pose on a Chancay culture vase in the Walters Art Museum

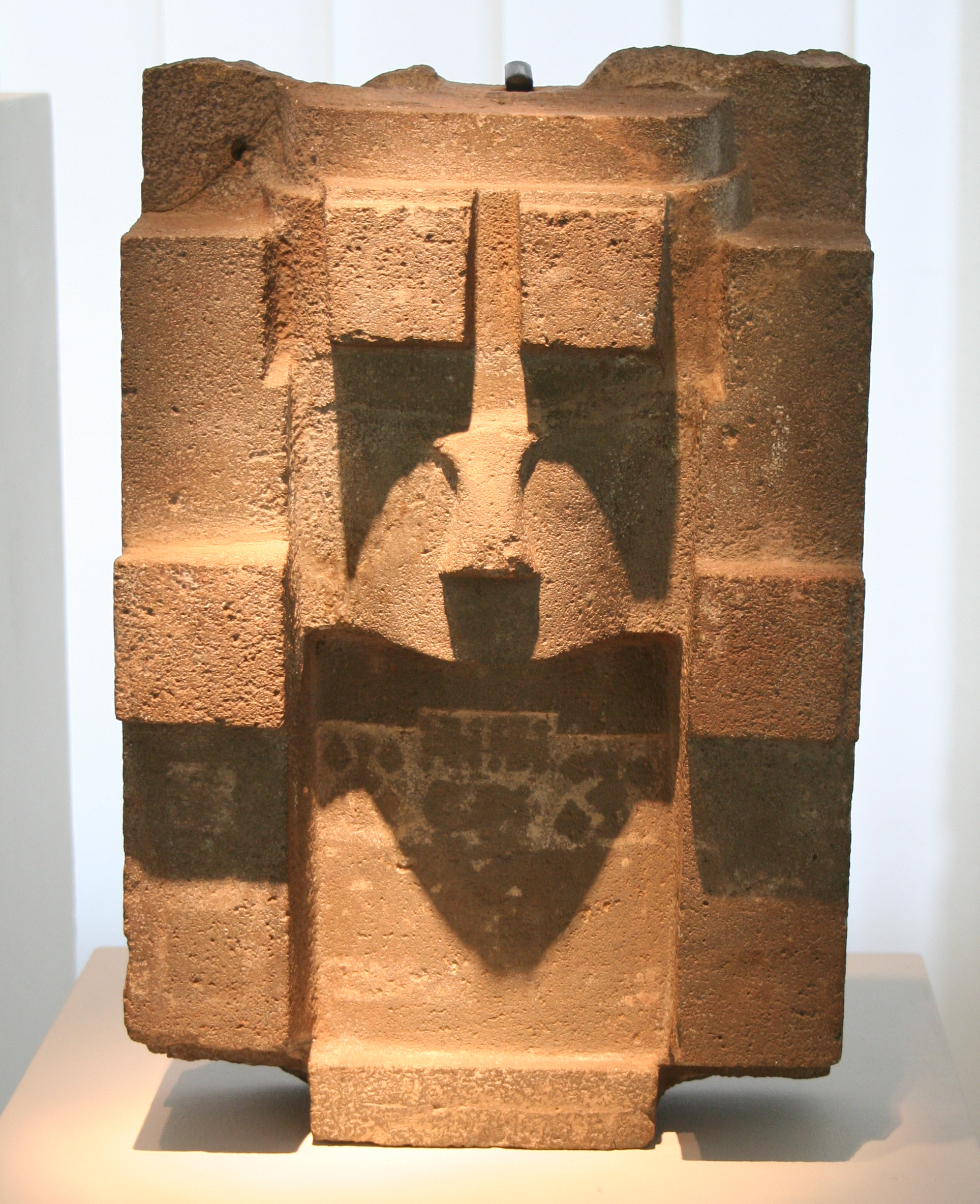
Staff God architrave fragment in the Ethnological Museum Berlin

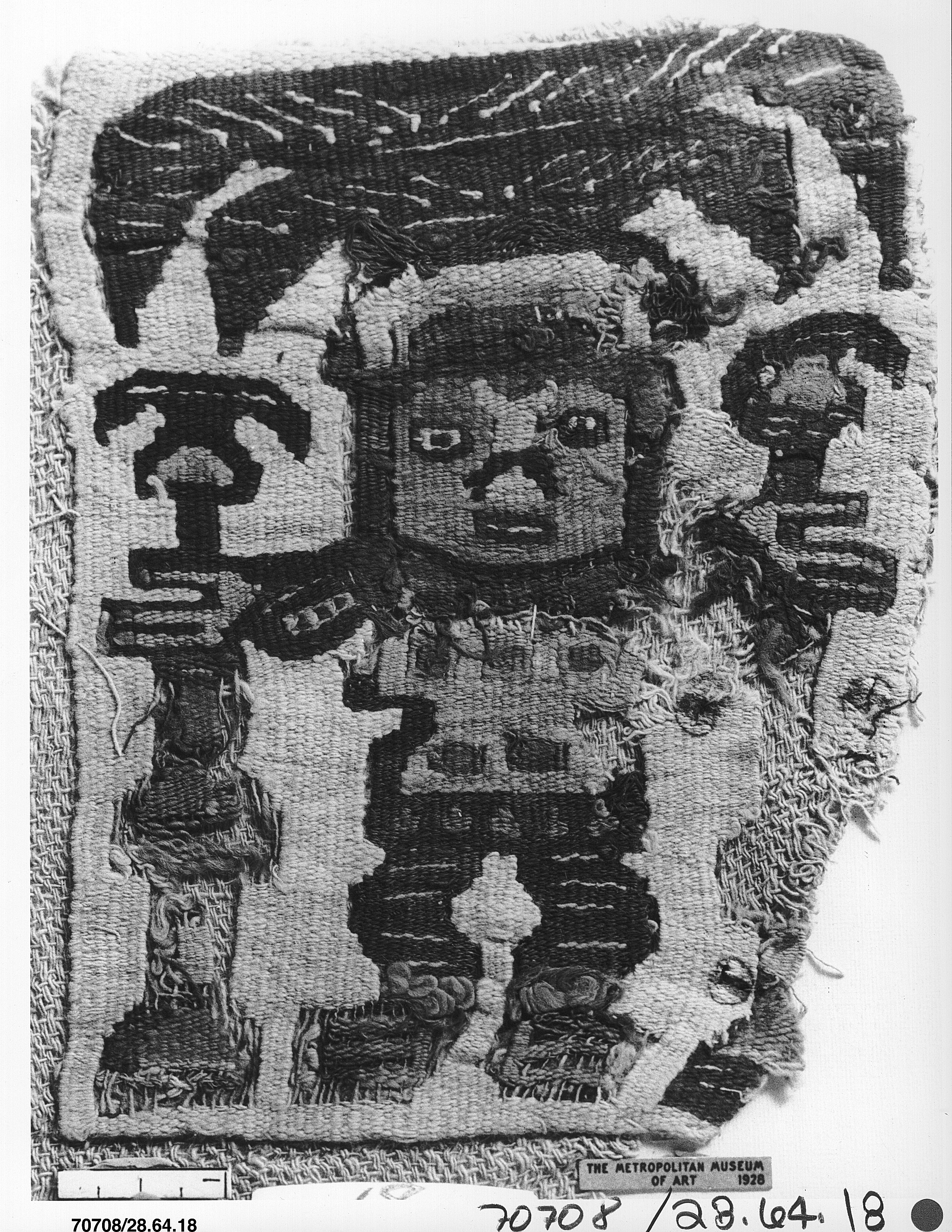
Lambayeque Textile fragment

Staff god figure on the Raimondi Stela

== See also ==
- Norte Chico civilization
- Wiracocha
