= Pokotia Monolith =

Ancient stone monument

The Pokotia Monolith (also known as the Pokotia Monument) is a stone statue excavated from the pre-Incan site of Pokotia in 1960 6 km (4 mi) from Tiwanaku in Bolivia. In December 2001 inscriptions and patterns on the front and back of the statue were photographed by a team led by the Bolivian archaeologist Bernardo Biados.

It resides in a small museum in Calle Jaén, La Paz, Bolivia; Museo de metales preciosos "Museo de Oro".
