= Viracocha =

Creator deity in Inca mythology

- Creator deity
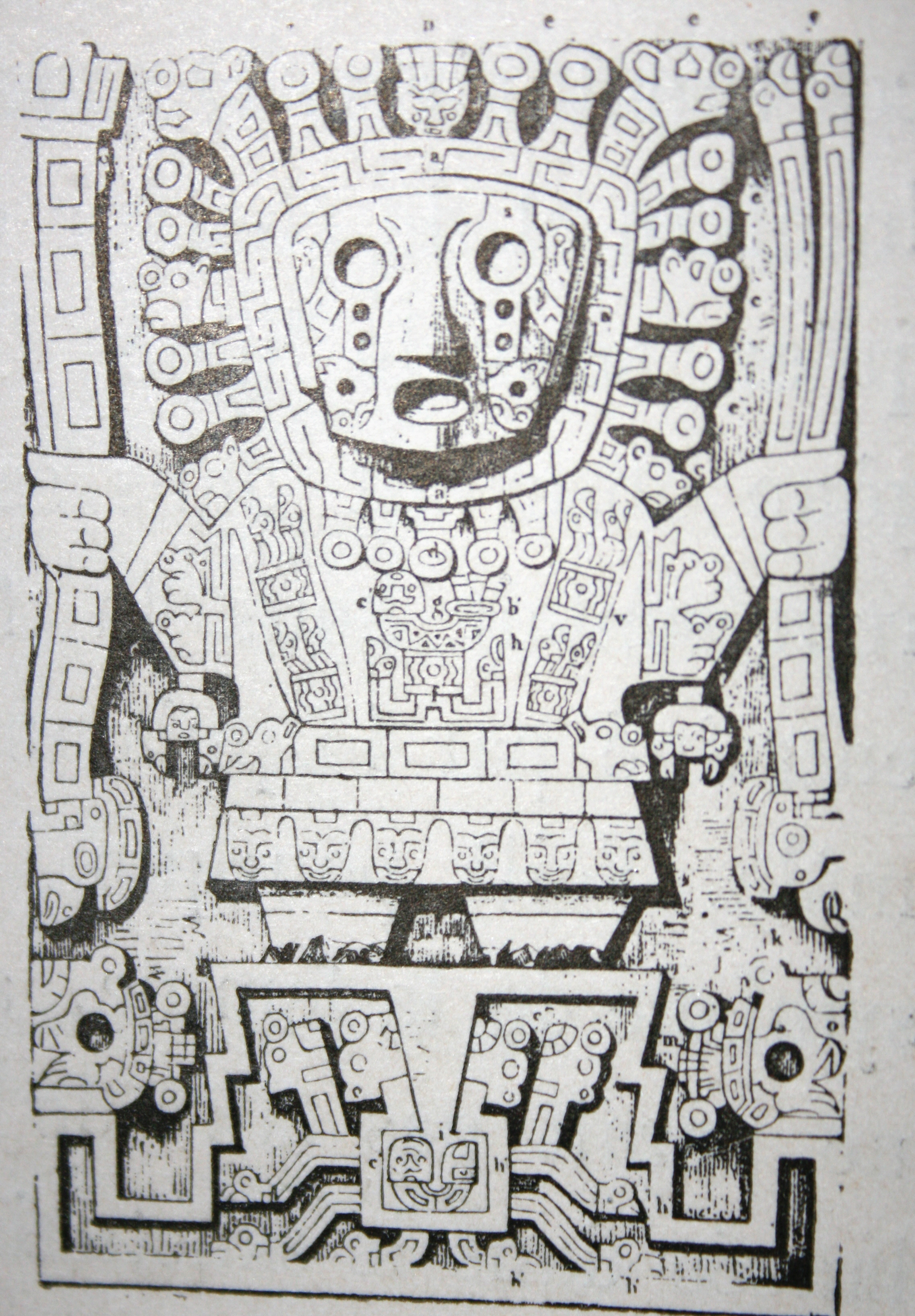
- A drawing of a relief of Viracocha at Tiwanaku by Charles Wiener
- Region: Andes Mountains

Genealogy
- Spouse: Mama Qucha
- Children: Inti, Mama Killa, Pachamama, Imahmana Viracocha, Tocapo Viracocha

Viracocha (also Wiraqocha, Huiracocha; Quechua Wiraqucha) is the creator and supreme deity in the pre-Inca and Inca mythology in the Andes region of South America. According to the myth Viracocha had human appearance and was generally considered as bearded. According to the myth he ordered the construction of Tiwanaku. It is also said that he was accompanied by men also referred to as Viracochas.

It is often referred to with several epithets. Such compound names include Ticsi Viracocha (T'iqsi Wiraqocha), Contiti Viracocha, and, occasionally, Kon-Tiki Viracocha (the source of the name of Thor Heyerdahl's raft). Other designations are "the creator", Viracochan Pachayachicachan, Viracocha Pachayachachi or Pachayachachic ("teacher of the world").

For the Inca the Viracocha cult was more important than the sun cult. Viracocha was the most important deity in the Inca pantheon and seen as the creator of all things, or the substance from which all things are created, and intimately associated with the sea. Viracocha was immediately followed by Inti, the Sun.

Viracocha created the universe, sun, moon, and stars, time (by commanding the sun to move over the sky) and civilization itself.

So-called Staff Gods do not all necessarily fit well with the Viracocha interpretation.

== Cosmogony according to Spanish accounts ==
According to a myth recorded by Juan de Betanzos, Viracocha rose from Lake Titicaca (or sometimes the cave of Paqariq Tampu) during the time of darkness to bring forth light. He made the sun, moon, and the stars. He made mankind by breathing into stones, but his first creation were brainless giants that displeased him. So, he destroyed them with a flood and made humans, beings who were better than the giants, from smaller stones. After creating them, they were scattered all over the world.

Viracocha eventually disappeared across the Pacific Ocean (by walking on the water), and never returned. He wandered the earth disguised as a beggar, teaching his new creations the basics of civilization, as well as working numerous miracles. Many, however, refused to follow his teachings, devolving into warfare and delinquency; Viracocha wept when he saw the plight of the creatures he had created. It was thought that Viracocha would re-appear in times of trouble. Pedro Sarmiento de Gamboa wrote that Viracocha was described as "a man of medium height, white and dressed in a white robe like an alb secured round the waist and that he carried a staff and a book in his hands."

In one legend he had one son, Inti, and two daughters, Mama Killa and Pachamama. In this legend, he destroyed the people around Lake Titicaca with a Great Flood called Unu Pachakuti, lasting 60 days and 60 nights, saving two to bring civilization to the rest of the world. These two beings are Manco Cápac, the son of Inti (sometimes taken as the son of Viracocha), which name means "splendid foundation", and Mama Uqllu, which means "mother fertility". These two founded the Inca civilization carrying a golden staff, called 'tapac-yauri'. In another legend, he fathered the first eight civilized human beings. In some stories, he has a wife called Mama Qucha.

In another legend, Viracocha had two sons, Imahmana Viracocha and Tocapo Viracocha. After the Great Flood and the Creation, Viracocha sent his sons to visit the tribes to the northeast and northwest to determine if they still obeyed his commandments. Viracocha traveled North. During their journey, Imaymana and Tocapo gave names to all the trees, flowers, fruits, and herbs. They also taught the tribes which of these were edible, which had medicinal properties, and which were poisonous. Eventually, Viracocha, Tocapo and Imahmana arrived at Cusco (in modern-day Peru) and the Pacific seacoast, where they walked away across the water until they disappeared. The word "Viracocha" literally means "Sea Foam."

== Etymology ==
Tiqsi Huiracocha (Spanish:Ticsi Viracocha) may have several meanings. In the Quechuan languages, tiqsi means "origin" or "beginning", wira means fat, and qucha means lake, sea, or reservoir. Viracocha's many epithets include great, all knowing, powerful, etc. Some people state that Wiraqucha could mean "Fat (or foam) of the sea", etymology that has been discarded for grammatical considerations (constituent order in Quechua) at least since Inca Garcilaso. According to German archeologist Max Uhle, "foam lake" is an incomprehensible name. He points out that Vira (Huira) can also be derived from the Quechua word huyra ("the end of all things"), and that Ticsi Viracocha therefore could have the meaning "lake of origin and of the end of all things".

Some linguists think that linguistic, historical and archaeological evidence suggest that the name could be a borrowing of Aymara Wila Quta (wila "blood"; quta "lake"), due to the sacrifices of camelids that were celebrated at Lake Titiqaqa by pre-Incan Andean cultures that spoke Aymara.

== Controversy over "white god" ==
The first Spanish chroniclers from the 16th century made no mention of any identification with Viracocha. The first to do so was Pedro Cieza de León in 1553. Similar accounts by Spanish chroniclers (e.g. Juan de Betanzos) describe Viracocha as a "white god", often with a beard. The whiteness of Viracocha is however not mentioned in the native authentic legends of the Incas and most modern scholars therefore had considered the "white god" story to be a post-conquest Spanish invention.

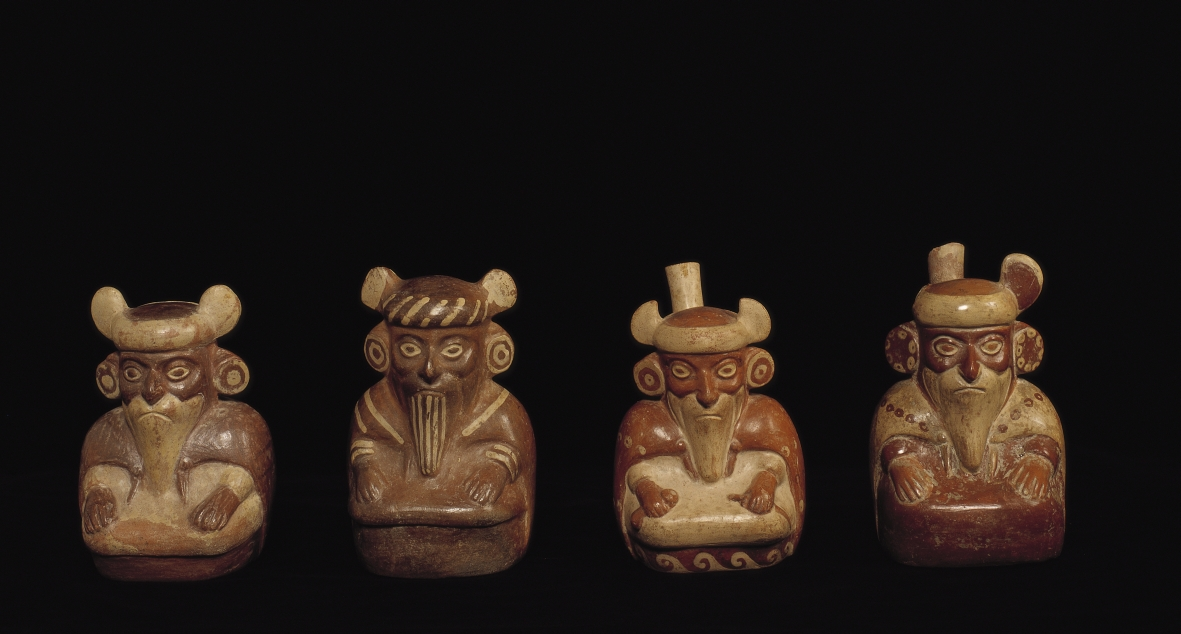
Moche ceramic vessels depicting bearded men

Similarly to the Incan god Viracocha, the Aztec god Quetzalcoatl and several other deities from Central and South American pantheons, like the Muisca god Bochica are described in legends as being bearded. The beard, once believed to be a mark of a prehistoric European influence and quickly fueled and embellished by spirits of the colonial era, had its single significance in the continentally insular culture of Mesoamerica. The Anales de Cuauhtitlan is a very important early source which is particularly valuable for having been originally written in Nahuatl. The Anales de Cuauhtitlan describes the attire of Quetzalcoatl at Tula:

Immediately he made him his green mask; he took red color with which he made the lips russet; he took yellow to make the facade; and he made the fangs; continuing, he made his beard of feathers...

In this quote the beard is represented as a dressing of feathers, fitting comfortably with academic impressions of Mesoamerican art. The story, however, does not mention whether Quetzalcoatl had facial hair or not with the point of outfitting him with a mask and symbolic feathered beard being to cover his unsightly appearance because as Quetzalcoatl said "If ever my subjects were to see me, they would run away!"

While descriptions of Viracocha's physical appearance are open to interpretation, men with beards were frequently depicted by the Peruvian Moche culture in its famous pottery, long before the arrival of the Spanish. Modern advocates of theories such as a pre-Columbian European migration to Peru cite these bearded ceramics and Viracocha's beard as being evidence for an early presence of non-Amerindians in Peru. Although most Indians do not have heavy beards, there are groups reported to have included bearded individuals, such as the Aché people of Paraguay, who also have light skin but who are not known to have any admixture with Europeans and Africans. When the Southern Paiute were first contacted by Europeans in 1776, the report by fathers Silvestre Vélez de Escalante and Francisco Atanasio Domínguez noted that "Some of the men had thick beards and were thought to look more in appearance like Spanish men than native Americans".

== Rock formation at Ollantaytambo ==
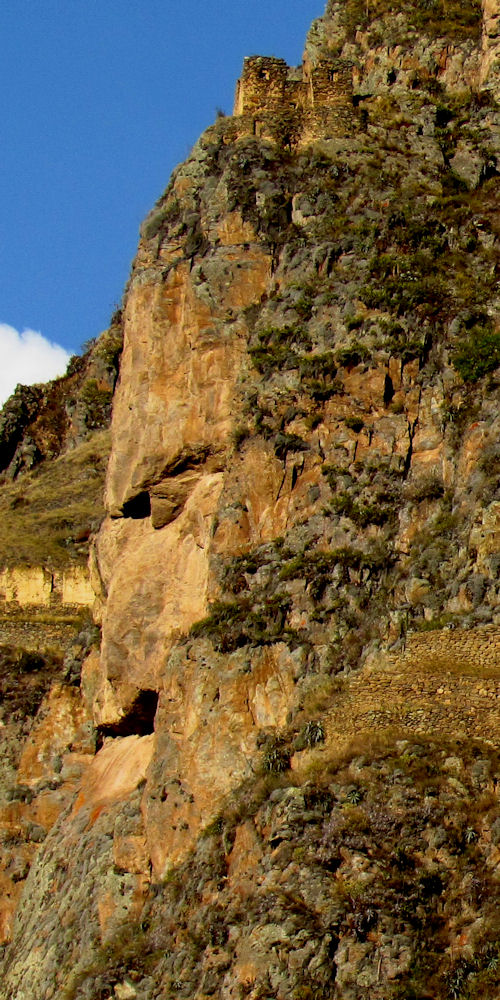
Rock formation said to resemble a face in stone of Wiracochan or Tunupa at Ollantaytambo

A rock formation in the small village of Ollantaytambo in southern Peru is said by local legend to be a naturally formed or carved representation of the messenger of Viracocha named Wiracochan or Tunupa. Ollantaytambo, located in the Cusco Region, makes up a chain of small villages along the Urubamba Valley. Known as the Sacred Valley, it was an important stronghold of the Inca Empire. Facing the ancient Inca ruins of Ollantaytambo in the rock face of Cerro Pinkuylluna is the 140-metre-high formation said to be a figure of Wiracochan. Inca ruins built on top of the face are also considered to represent a crown on his head. Artists' impressions of the rock face also include a heavy beard and a large sack upon his shoulders. This legend became fashionable after a 1995 book by Fernando and Edgar Elorrieta Salazar.

Wiracochan, the pilgrim preacher of knowledge, the master of time, is described as a person with superhuman power—a bearded, tall man dressed as a priest or astronomer.

== Conversion to Christianity ==
Spanish scholars and chroniclers provide many insights regarding the identity of Viracocha.

1. Bartolomé de las Casas states that viracocha means "creator of all things"
2. Juan de Betanzos confirms the above in saying that "We may say that Viracocha is God"
3. Polo, Sarmiento de Gamboa, Blas Valera and Acosta all reference Viracocha as a creator
4. Guamán Poma, an indigenous chronicler, considers the term "viracocha" to be equivalent to "creator"

Spanish interpreters generally attributed the identity of supreme creator to Viracocha during the initial years of colonization.

The decision to use the term "God" in place of "Viracocha" is seen as the first step in the evangelization of the Incas. The reasoning behind this strategy includes the fact that it was likely difficult to explain the Christian idea of "God" to the Incas, who failed to understand the concept. In addition, replacing reference to Viracocha with "God" facilitated the substitution of the local concept of divinity with Christian theology.

== See also ==
- The Colombian myth of Bochica who has a similar role as creator and civilizer as Viracocha
- Moche culture
- Staff God
- Tiwanaku
