= Qiru =

Ancient Andean drinking vessel

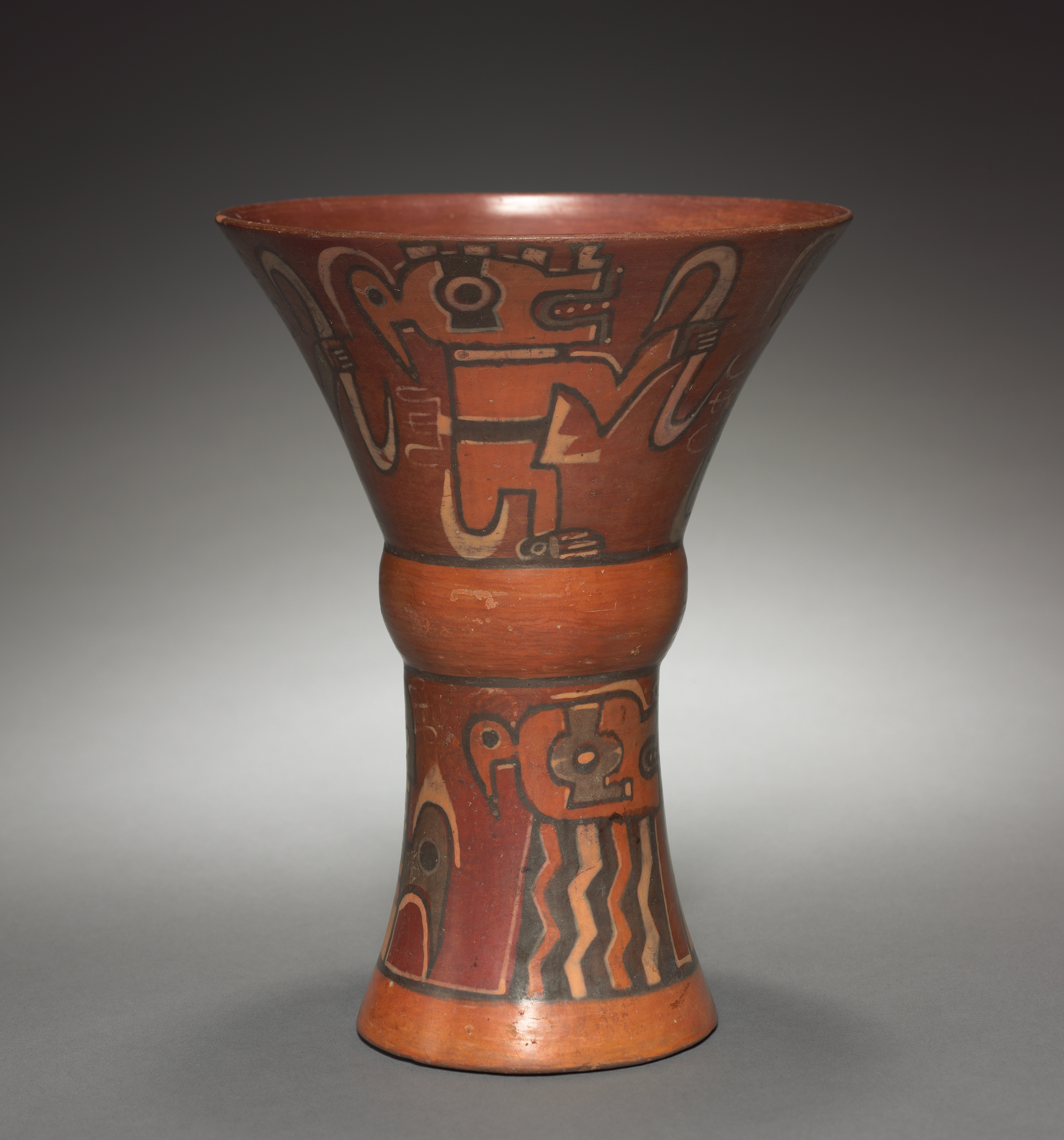
Tiwanaku qiru held at the Cleveland Museum of Art

A qiru (also spelled kero, quero, and locally also qero) is an ancient Andean cup used to drink liquids like alcohol, or more specifically, chicha. They can be made from wood, ceramics, silver, or gold. Metal or gold cups are also called aquilas. They were traditionally used in Andean feasts.

Qirus were decorated by first cutting a shallow pattern on the surface of the cup, then filling the pattern with a durable, waterproof mixture of plant resin and pigment such as cinnabar. The finely incised lines would meet at intersection points that collaborated to create shapes such as triangles, squares, and diamonds. The shapes are organized in two to four horizontal registers.

One is generally decorated with lavish, hand-painted, geometric designs that follow the traditional techniques in Písac ceramics. Others, however, may be painted with narrative scenes that show the life of the Inca. Those Qirus which show the life of the Inca were produced in colonial times and are not authentic Incan Qirus. Many times they are solitary, other times they are found together with other types of Peruvian pottery. Qiru production reached its peak between 1000 and 1200 CE but continued after European contact. Qirus are most commonly found in Moquegua, Peru. The Museo Contisuyo in Moquegua has qirus on display.

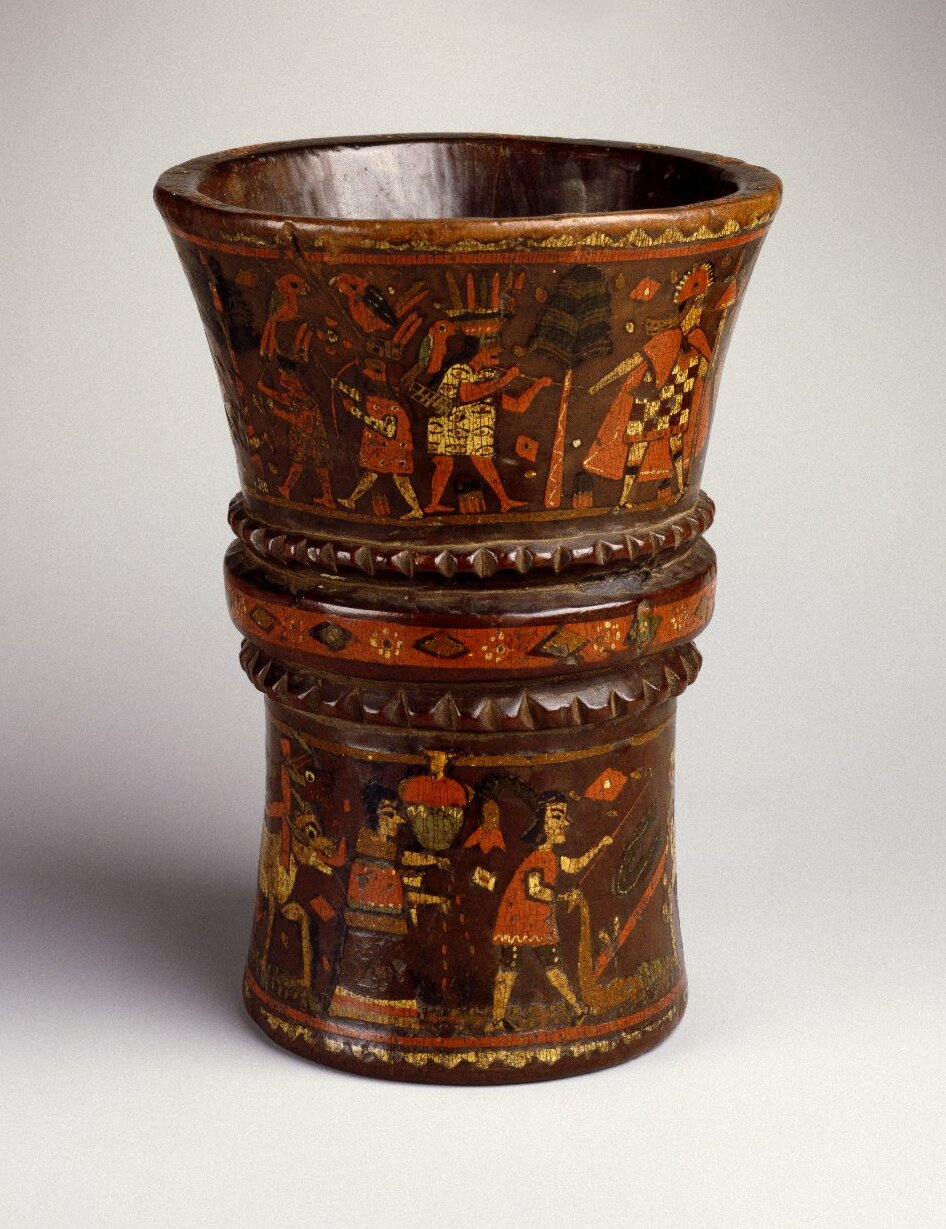
Qiru cup, late 17th-18th century. Wood with pigment inlay, Brooklyn Museum

During Inca times, the vessels were typically made in identical pairs. This followed the custom that two individuals were required to drink together and both qirus in the pair would have identical size, shape, and decoration. These pairs were typically used for toasts in ceremonies and were also given along with textiles as gifts as a sign of Inca generosity.

== Cultural Context ==
Qiru production began in the Early Intermediate Period (100-600 CE), which was a time period that witnessed socio-political intensification and saw an increase in the amount of political elites throughout the Andes. This was only furthered by the ritualistic ceremonies of the time. The cultures of the Andes became intermixed through these ceremonies and they contributed to the further stratification of classes because of their emphasis on hierarchy and authority. Qirus played a significant role in these ceremonies. The ritual importance of the kero is emphasized by the enormous stone stelas that can be found at the epicenter of the Tiwanaku state, Bolivia that contain renderings of qirus. Some of these stelas hold a snuff tray and a qiru in each of their hands. The stereotypical representation of the stelas implies that they are not representations of historical people.

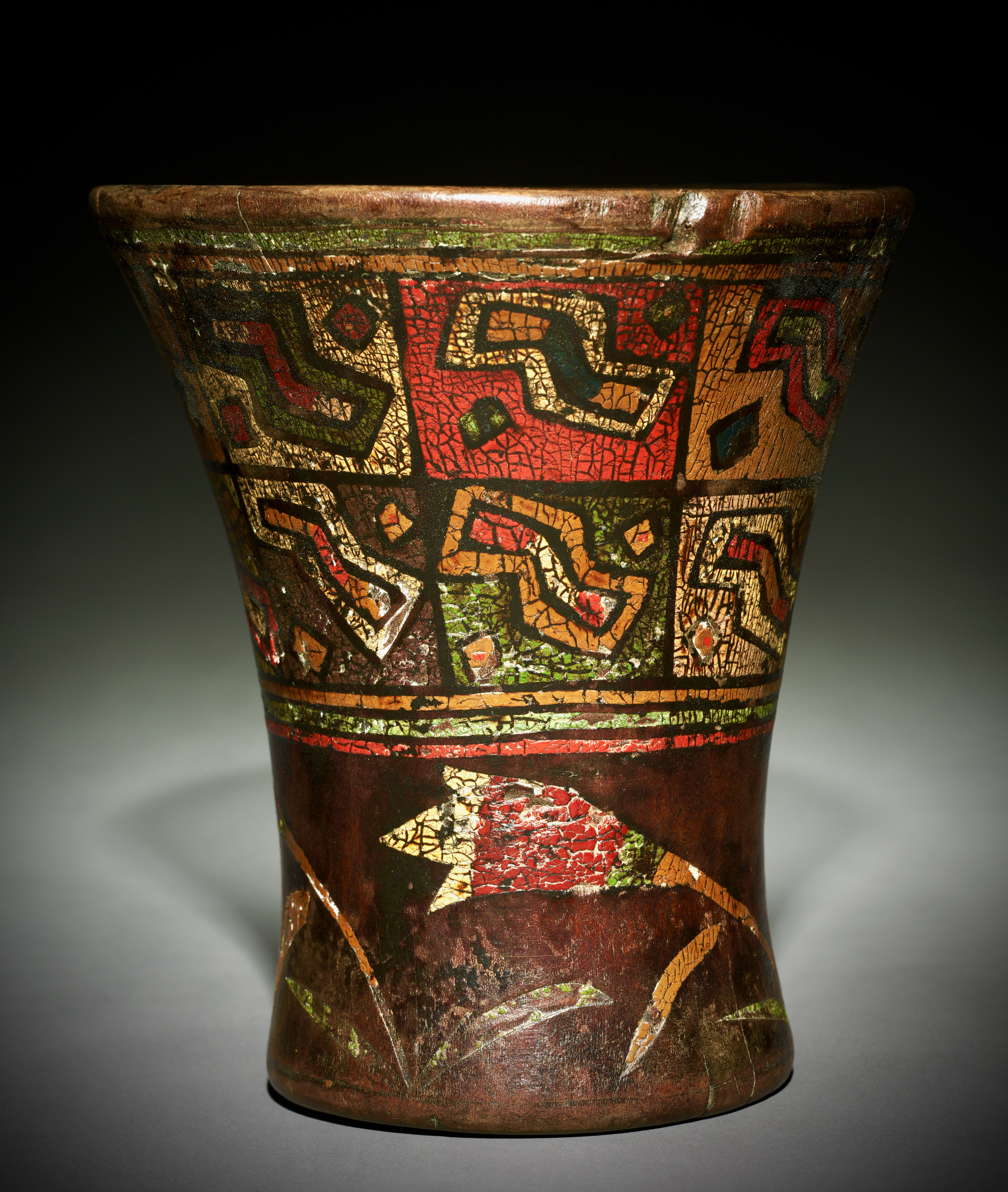
Kero, Peru, after 1550. Cleveland Museum of Art

There is a strong religious connection with the kero as well. Chicha was known as an important ritual libation and offering in ancient Andean culture. Chicha was served in qirus, where a special goblet version of the qiru was very closely connected to the "Sacrifice Ceremony" depicted on Moche painted ceramics. Many depictions of the qiru show a maize plant emerging from the vessel. These renderings allude to qirus' use as a pan-Andean offering receptacle for blood to be poured on the ground to guarantee a successful farming season. The qirus used for this purpose are different in that they do not follow the same beaker form as traditional qirus and are metal instead of clay or wood.
