= Tiwanaku =

Archaeological site in Bolivia

- Tiahuanaco, Tiahuanacu
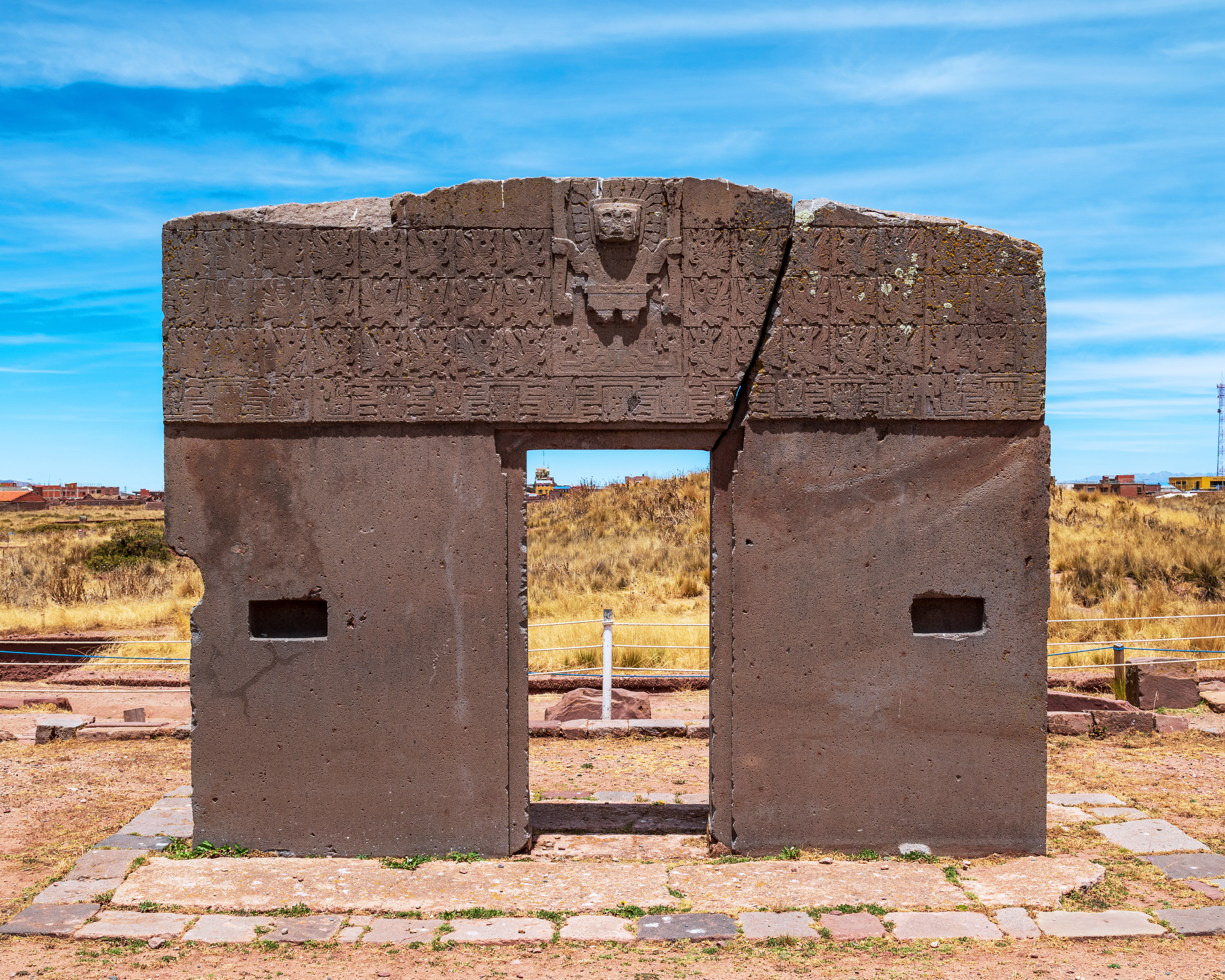
- The "Gate of the Sun"

- Location within Bolivia
- 16°33′17″S 68°40′24″W
- Type: Settlement
- Periods: Early Intermediate to Late Intermediate
- Cultures: Tiwanaku polity
- Location: Tiwanaku Municipality, Bolivia

History
- Built: c. 110 AD?
- Abandoned: c. 1050 AD

Site notes
- Condition: In ruins

UNESCO World Heritage Site
- Official name: Tiwanaku: Spiritual and Political Centre of the Tiwanaku Culture
- Type: Cultural
- Criteria: iii, iv
- Designated: 2000 (24th session)
- Reference no.: 567
- Region: South America

Tiwanaku (Spanish: Tiahuanaco or Tiahuanacu) is a Pre-Columbian archaeological site in western Bolivia, near Lake Titicaca, about 70 kilometers from La Paz, and it is one of the largest sites in South America. It is just north of another ancient building site, Qhunqhu Wankani. Surface remains currently cover around 4 square kilometers and include decorated ceramics, monumental structures, and megalithic blocks. It has been conservatively estimated that the site was inhabited by 10,000 to 20,000 people in AD 800.

The site was first recorded in written history in 1549 by Spanish conquistador Pedro Cieza de León while he was searching for the southern Inca capital of Qullasuyu.

Bernabé Cobo, a Jesuit chronicler of Peru, reported that Tiwanaku's name once was taypiqala, which is Aymara meaning "stone in the center", alluding to the belief that it lay at the center of the world. The name by which Tiwanaku was known to its inhabitants may have been lost, as they had no written language. Heggarty and Beresford-Jones suggest that the Puquina language is most likely to have been the language of Tiwanaku.

== Site history ==
The dating of the site has been significantly refined over the last century. From 1910 to 1945, Arthur Posnansky maintained that the site was 11,000–17,000 years old based on comparisons to geological eras and archaeoastronomy. Beginning in the 1970s, Carlos Ponce Sanginés proposed the site was first occupied around 1580 BC, the site's oldest radiocarbon date. This date is still seen in some publications and museums in Bolivia. Since the 1980s, researchers have recognized this date as unreliable, leading to the consensus that the site is no older than 200 or 300 BC. More recently, a statistical assessment of reliable radiocarbon dates estimates that the site was founded around AD 110 (50–170, 68% probability), a date supported by the lack of ceramic styles from earlier periods.

Tiwanaku began its steady growth in the early centuries of the first millennium AD. From approximately AD 375 to 700, this Andean city grew to significance. At its height, the city of Tiwanaku spanned an area of roughly 4 square kilometers (1.5 square miles) and had a population greater than 10,000 individuals. The growth of the city was due to its complex agropastoral economy, supported by trade.

The society appeared to have collapsed around AD 1000; the reason for this is still open to debate. Recent studies by geologist Elliott Arnold of the University of Pittsburgh have shown evidence of a greater amount of aridity in the region around the time of collapse. A drought in the region would have affected local systems of agriculture and likely played a role in the collapse of Tiwanaku.

== Relationships ==
The Tiawanaku culture increased its power in the Titicaca basin in the period 200-500 AD, reaching a peak in 500-600 AD.

The people of Tiwanaku held a tight relationship with the Wari culture. The Wari and Tiwanaku civilizations shared the same iconography, referred to as the "Southern Andean Iconographic Series". The relationship between the two civilizations is presumed to be trade based or military based. The Wari aren't the only other civilization that Tiwanaku could have had contact with. Inca cities also contained similar types of architecture Infrastructure seen in Tiwanaku. From this it can be expected that the Inca took some inspiration from the city of Tiwanaku and other early civilizations in the Andean basin.

== Structures ==
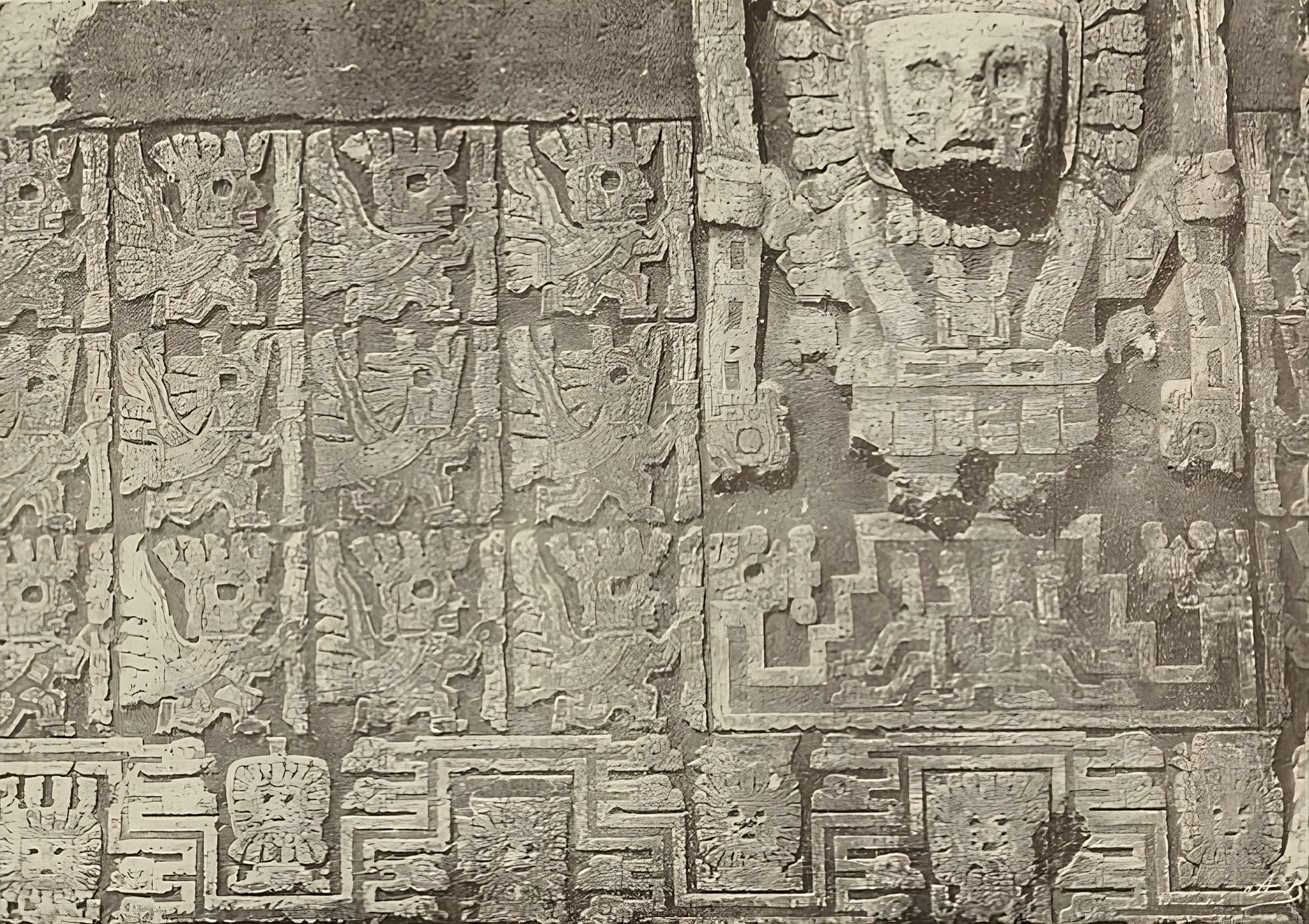
Carving in the Gate of the Sun of Tiwanaku, (Photography of 1903).

The structures that have been excavated by researchers at Tiwanaku include the terraced platform mound Akapana, Akapana East, and Pumapunku stepped platforms, the Kalasasaya, the Kantatallita, the Kheri Kala, and Putuni enclosures, and the Semi-Subterranean Temple.

Some authors ascribe to the "Tiwanaku moat theory" and say that the elites of Tiwanaku lived on the site inside four walls that were surrounded by a moat. The reason for this moat, some believe, was to create the image of a sacred island. Inside the walls were many images devoted to human origin, which only the elites would see. Commoners may have entered this structure only for ceremonial purposes since it was home to the holiest of shrines.

Different theories for the skill shown by Tiwanaku's architectural construction have been proposed. Perhaps they used a luk’ a, which is a standard measurement of about sixty centimeters. Jean-Pierre Protzen and Stella Nair state that "Through all our measurements, we could not only not corroborate this hypothesis, but we were unable-until now-to detect a convincing unit of measurement, or module, from which to derive other measurements either as multiples or fractions of this module." Another argument is for the Pythagorean Ratio. This idea calls for right triangles at a ratio of five to four to three used in the gateways to measure all parts. Lastly, Protzen and Nair argue that Tiwanaku had a system set for individual elements dependent on context and composition. This is shown in the construction of similar gateways ranging from diminutive to monumental size, proving that scaling factors did not affect proportion. With each added element, the individual pieces were shifted to fit together.

As the population grew, occupational niches developed, and people specialized in certain skills. Artisans who worked in pottery, jewelry, and textiles grew in number.

Like the later Inca, the Tiwanaku had few commercial or market institutions. Instead, the culture relied on elite redistribution. That is, the elites of the state controlled essentially all economic output but were expected to provide each commoner with all the resources needed to perform his or her function or occupations such as agriculturists, herders, pastoralists, etc. The specialization was accompanied by hierarchical stratification within the state.

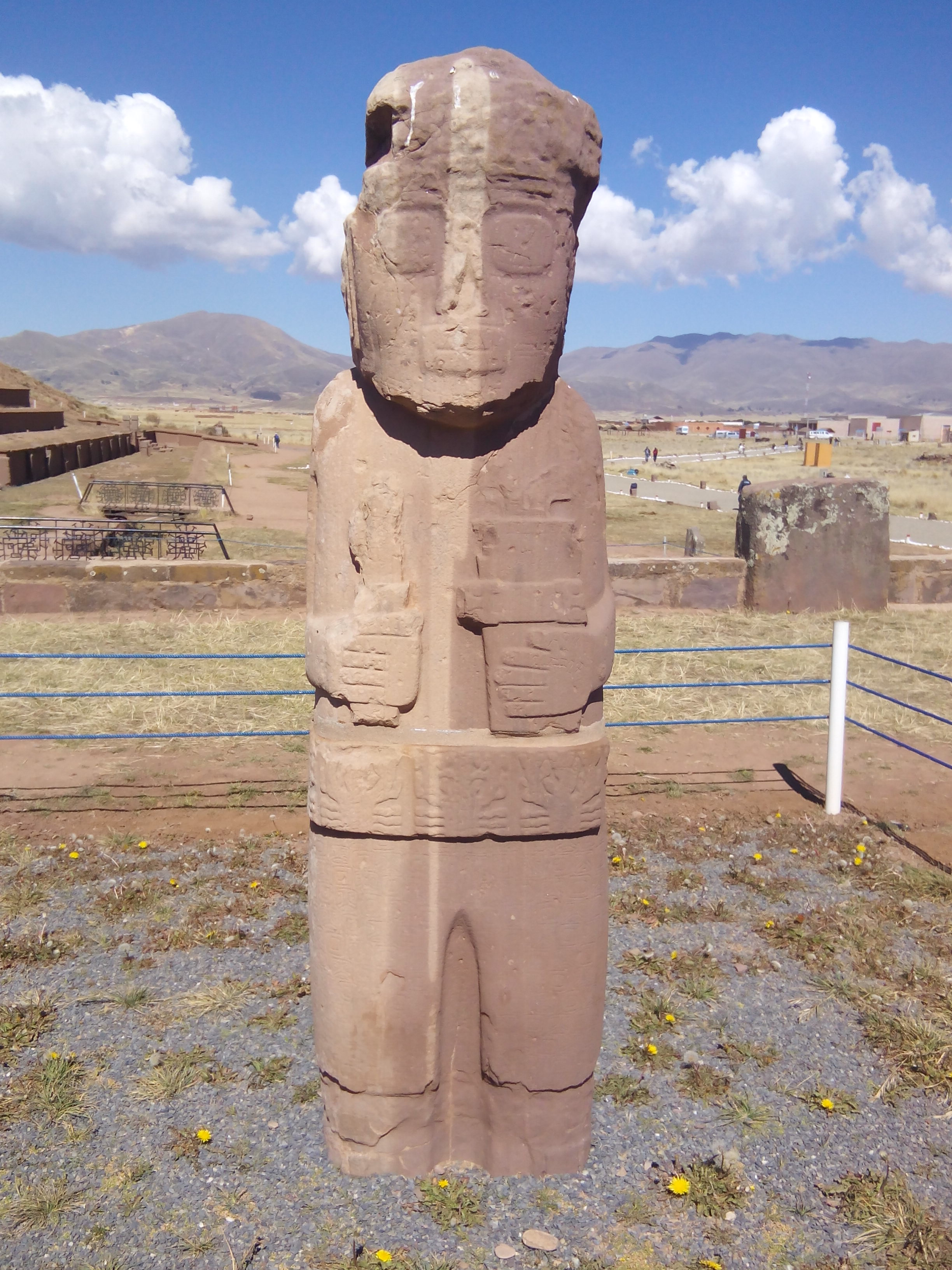
Fraile Monolith, holding a snuff tray and a Qiru; the belt shows sprouting plants that are often mistaken for crabs

=== Akapana ===
The Akapana is a "half Andean Cross"-shaped structure that is 257 m wide, 197 m broad at its maximum, and 16.5 m tall. At its center appears to have been a sunken court. This was nearly destroyed by a deep looters excavation that extends from the center of this structure to its eastern side. Material from the looter's excavation was dumped off the eastern side of the Akapana. A staircase is present on its western side. Possible residential complexes might have occupied both the northeast and southeast corners of this structure.

=== Akapana East ===
The Akapana East was built on the eastern side of early Tiwanaku. Later it was considered a boundary between the ceremonial center and the urban area. It was made of a thick, prepared floor of sand and clay, which supported a group of buildings. Yellow and red clay was used in different areas for what seems like aesthetic purposes. It was swept clean of all domestic refuse, signaling its great importance to the culture.

=== Pumapunku ===
The Pumapunku is a man-made platform built on an east-west axis like the Akapana. It is a T-shaped, terraced earthen platform mound faced with megalithic blocks. It is 167.36 m wide along its north-south axis and 116.7 m broad along its east-west axis and is 5 m tall. Identical 20-meter-wide projections extend 27.6 meters north and south from the northeast and southeast corners of the Pumapunku. Walled and unwalled courts and an esplanade are associated with this structure.

A prominent feature of the Pumapunku is a large stone terrace; it is 6.75 by 38.72 meters in dimension and paved with large stone blocks. It is called the "Plataforma Lítica" and contains the largest stone block found in the Tiwanaku site. According to Ponce Sangines, the block is estimated to weigh 131 metric tonnes. The second-largest stone block found within the Pumapunku is estimated to be 85 metric tonnes.

Scattered around the site of the Puma Punku are various types of cut stones. Due to the complexity of the stonework the site is often cited by conspiracy theorists to be a site of ancient alien intervention. These claims are entirely unsubstantiated. The most informed reconstruction of the building is based on the 3D printing and modeling by Alexei Vranich.

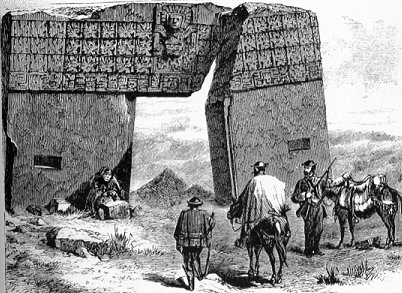
"Gateway of the Sun", Tiwanaku, drawn by Ephraim Squier in 1877. The vertical scale is exaggerated in this drawing.

=== Kalasasaya ===
The Kalasasaya is a large courtyard more than 300 feet long, outlined by a high gateway. It is located to the north of the Akapana and west of the Semi-Subterranean Temple. Within the courtyard is where explorers found the Gateway of the Sun. Since the late 20th century, researchers have theorized that this was not the gateway's original location.

Near the courtyard is the Semi-Subterranean Temple; a square sunken courtyard that is unique for its north-south rather than east-west axis. The walls are covered with tenon heads of many different styles, suggesting that the structure was reused for different purposes over time. It was built with walls of sandstone pillars and smaller blocks of Ashlar masonry. The largest stone block in the Kalasasaya is estimated to weigh 26.95 metric tons.

Within many of the site's structures are impressive gateways; the ones of monumental scale are placed on artificial mounds, platforms, or sunken courts. One gateway shows the iconography of a front-facing figure in Staff God pose. This iconography also is used on some oversized vessels, indicating an importance to the culture. The iconography of the Gateway of the Sun called Southern Andean Iconographic Series can be seen on several stone sculptures, Qirus, snuff trays and other Tiwanaku artifacts.

The unique carvings on the top of the Gate of the sun depict animals and other beings. Some have claimed that the symbolism represents a calendar system unique to the people of Tiwanaku, although there is no definitive evidence that this theory is correct.

The Gateway of the Sun and others located at Pumapunku are not complete. They are missing part of a typical recessed frame known as a chambranle, which typically have sockets for clamps to support later additions. These architectural examples, as well as the Akapana Gate, have unique detail and demonstrate high skill in stone-cutting. This reveals a knowledge of descriptive geometry. The regularity of elements suggests they are part of a system of proportions.

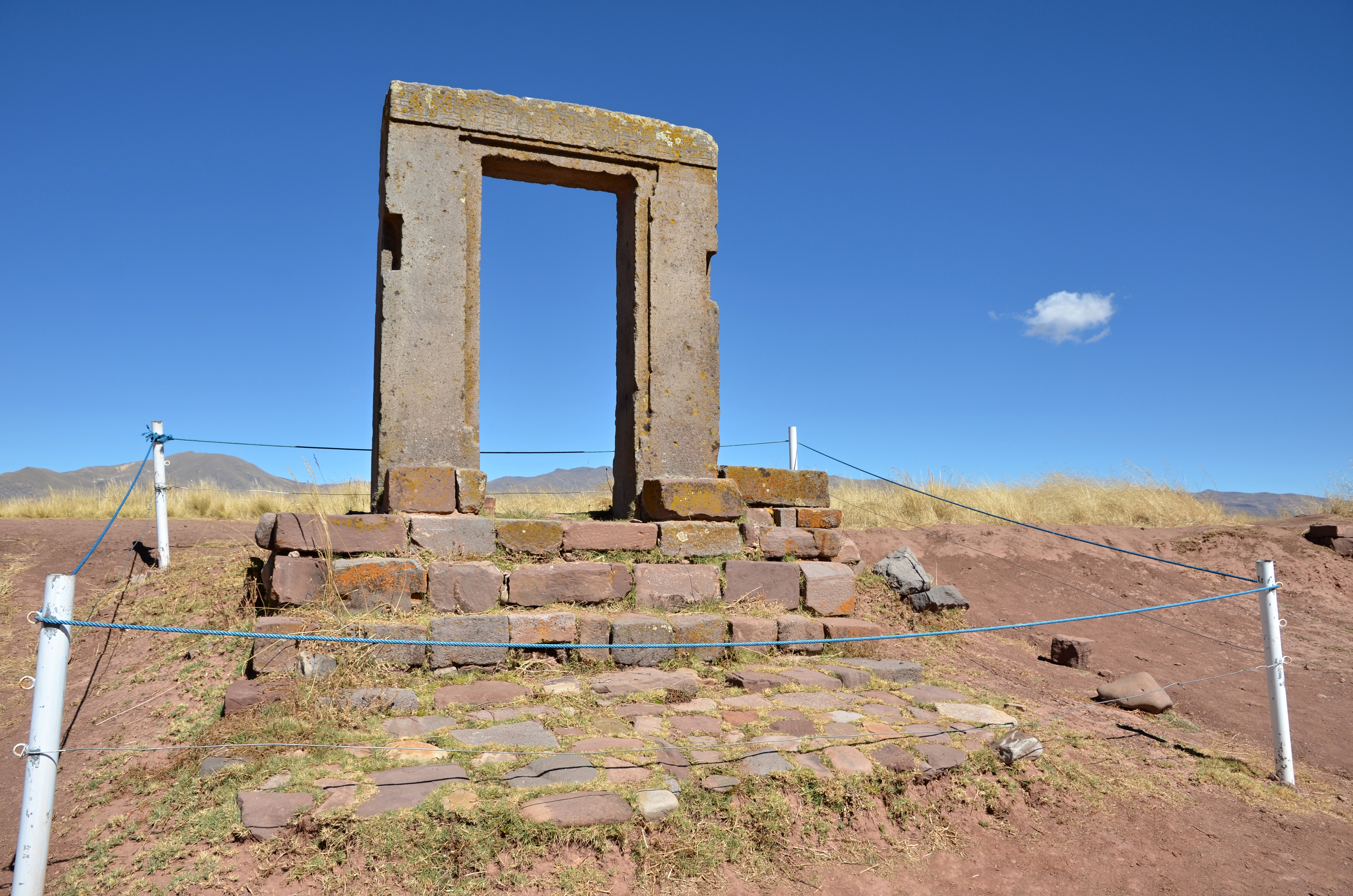
Gate of the Moon.

== Cosmology ==
In many Andean cultures, mountains are venerated and may be considered sacred objects. The site of Tiwanaku is located in the valley between two sacred mountains, Pukara and Chuqi Q’awa. At such temples in ancient times, ceremonies were conducted to honor and pay gratitude to the gods and spirits. They were places of worship and rituals that helped unify Andean peoples through shared symbols and pilgrimage destinations.

Tiwanaku became a center of pre-Columbian religious ceremonies for both the general public and elites. For example, human sacrifice was used in several pre-Columbian civilizations to appease a god in exchange for good fortune. Excavations of the Akapana at Tiwanaku revealed the remains of sacrificial dedications of humans and camelids. Some Tiwanaku imagery includes a rare "sacrificer" motif with both human and camelid features and is shown carrying a trophy head or an axe. Dubbed the "Tiwanaku Camelid Sacrificer" by scholars, it appears most often on portable prestige objects (such as snuff-related items, textiles, and carved bone tubes), especially in Tiwanaku hinterland contexts connected to camelid caravan networks. Researchers say camelids and humans share camay (an essence/power of being), and the Tiwanaku Camelid Sacrificer represents tucoy (the process of becoming/transforming into a new form).

Researchers speculate that the Akapana may also have been used as an astronomical observatory. It was constructed so that it was aligned with the peak of Quimsachata, providing a view of the rotation of the Milky Way from the southern pole. Other structures like Kalasasaya are positioned to provide optimal views of the sunrise on the Equinox, Summer Solstice, and Winter Solstice. Although the symbolic and functional value of these monuments can only be speculated upon, the Tiwanaku were able to study and interpret the positions of the sun, moon, Milky Way and other celestial bodies well enough to give them a significant role in their architecture.

Aymara legends place Tiwanaku at the center of the universe, probably because of the importance of its geographical location. The Tiwanaku were highly aware of their natural surroundings and would use them and their understanding of astronomy as reference points in their architectural plans. The most significant landmarks in Tiwanaku are the mountains and Lake Titicaca. The lake level of Lake Titicaca has fluctuated significantly over time. The spiritual importance and location of the lake contributed to the religious significance of Tiwanaku. In the Tiwanaku worldview, Lake Titicaca is the spiritual birthplace of their cosmic beliefs. According to Incan mythology, Lake Titicaca is the birthplace of Viracocha, who was responsible for creating the sun, moon, people, and the cosmos. In the Kalasasaya at Tiwanaku, carved atop a monolith known as the Gate of the Sun, is a front-facing figure holding a spear-thrower and snuff. Some speculate that this is a representation of Viracocha. However, it is also possible that this figure represents a deity that the Aymara refer to as "Tunuupa" who, like Viracocha, is associated with legends of creation and destruction.

The Aymara, who are thought to be descendants of the Tiwanaku, have a complex belief system similar to the cosmology of several other Andean civilizations. They believe in the existence of three spaces: Arajpacha, the upper world; Akapacha, the middle or inner world; and Manqhaoacha, the lower world. Often associated with the cosmos and Milky Way, the upper world is considered to be where celestial beings live. The middle world is where all living things are, and the lower world is where life itself is inverted.

== Archaeology ==
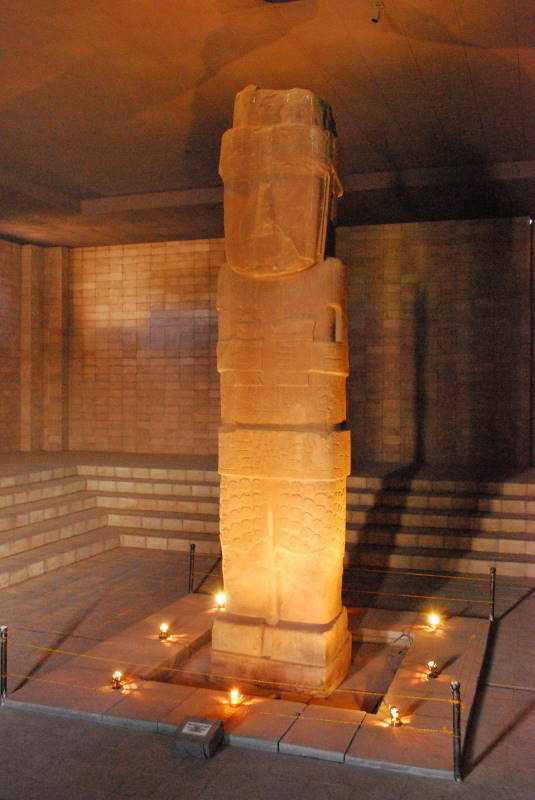
The Bennett Monolith (now at the Tiwanaku Site Museum) was found in the centre of the Semi-Subterranean Temple by Wendell C. Bennett. It is the largest Stele ever found in the Andean world (7,3 m tall).

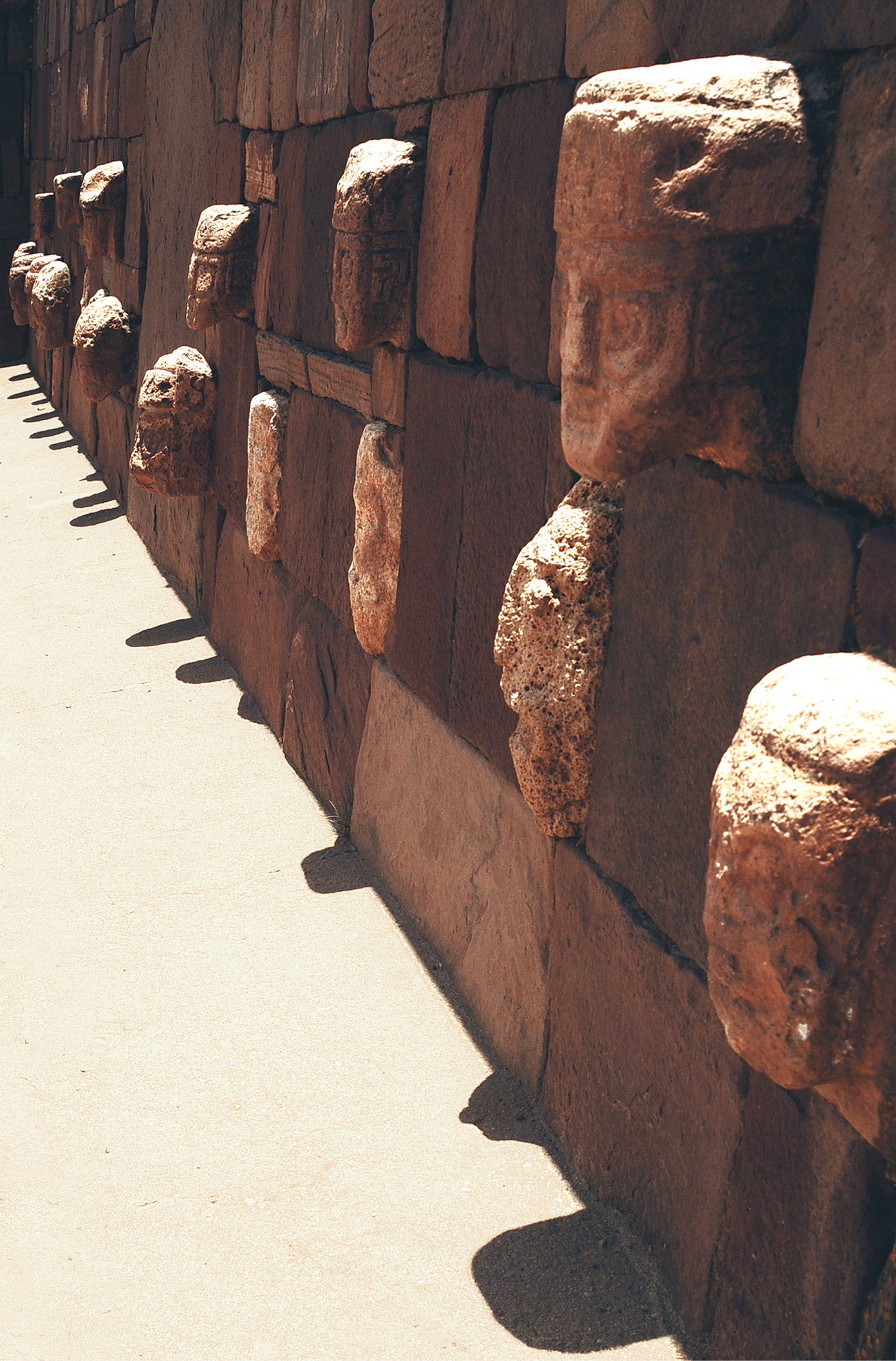
Heads in the Semi-Subterranean Temple.

As the site has suffered from looting and amateur excavations since shortly after Tiwanaku's fall, archeologists must attempt to interpret it with the understanding that materials have been jumbled and destroyed. This destruction continued during the Spanish conquest and colonial period, and during 19th century and the early 20th century. Other damage was committed by people quarrying stone for building and railroad construction, and target practice by military personnel.

No standing buildings have survived at the modern site. Only public, non-domestic foundations remain, with poorly reconstructed walls. The ashlar blocks used in many of these structures were mass-produced in similar styles so that they could possibly be used for multiple purposes. Throughout the period of the site, certain buildings changed purposes, causing a mix of artifacts found today.

Detailed study of Tiwanaku began on a small scale in the mid-nineteenth century. Rivero and Tschudi's Antigüedades peruanas (1851) placed the origin of Peruvian civilization at the site, a view widely held at the time, and used an engraving of the Gate of the Sun as the frontispiece to its plate volume. In the 1860s, Ephraim George Squier visited the ruins and later published maps and sketches completed during his visit. German geologist Alphons Stübel spent nine days in Tiwanaku in 1876, creating a map of the site based on careful measurements. He also made sketches and created paper impressions of carvings and other architectural features. A book containing major photographic documentation was published in 1892 by engineer Georg von Grumbkow, With commentary by archaeologist Max Uhle, this was the first in-depth scientific account of the ruins.

Von Grumbkow had first visited Tiwanaku between the end of 1876 and the beginning of 1877, when he accompanied as a photographer the expedition of French adventurer Théodore Ber, financed by American businessman Henry Meiggs, against Ber's promise of donating the artifacts he will find, on behalf of Meiggs, to Washington's Smithsonian Institution and the American Museum of Natural History in New York. Ber's expedition was cut short by the violent hostility of the local population, instigated by the Catholic parish priest, but von Grumbkow's early pictures survive.

Pictures of archaeological excavations in 1903

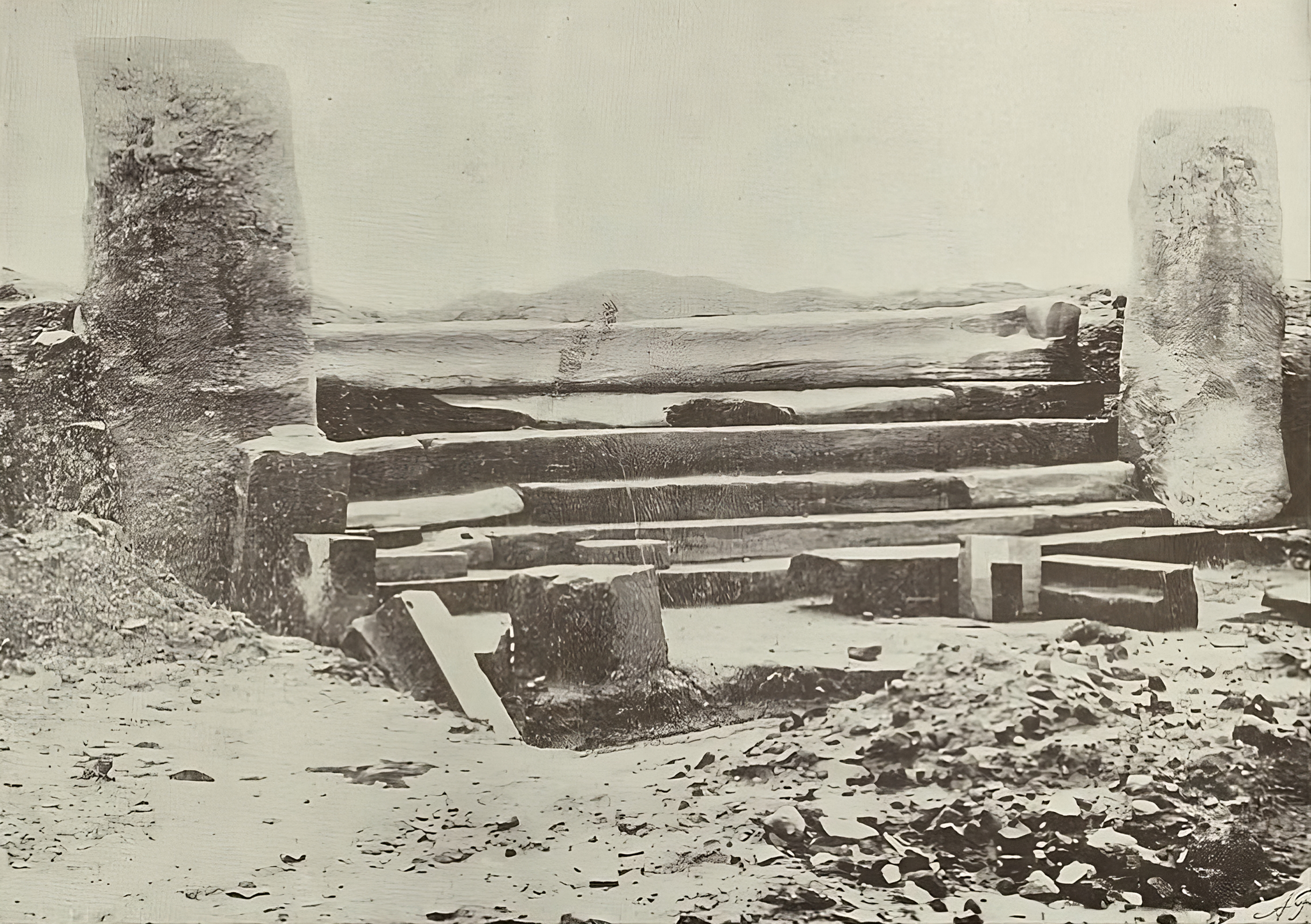
Stairs of Kalasasaya (1903)

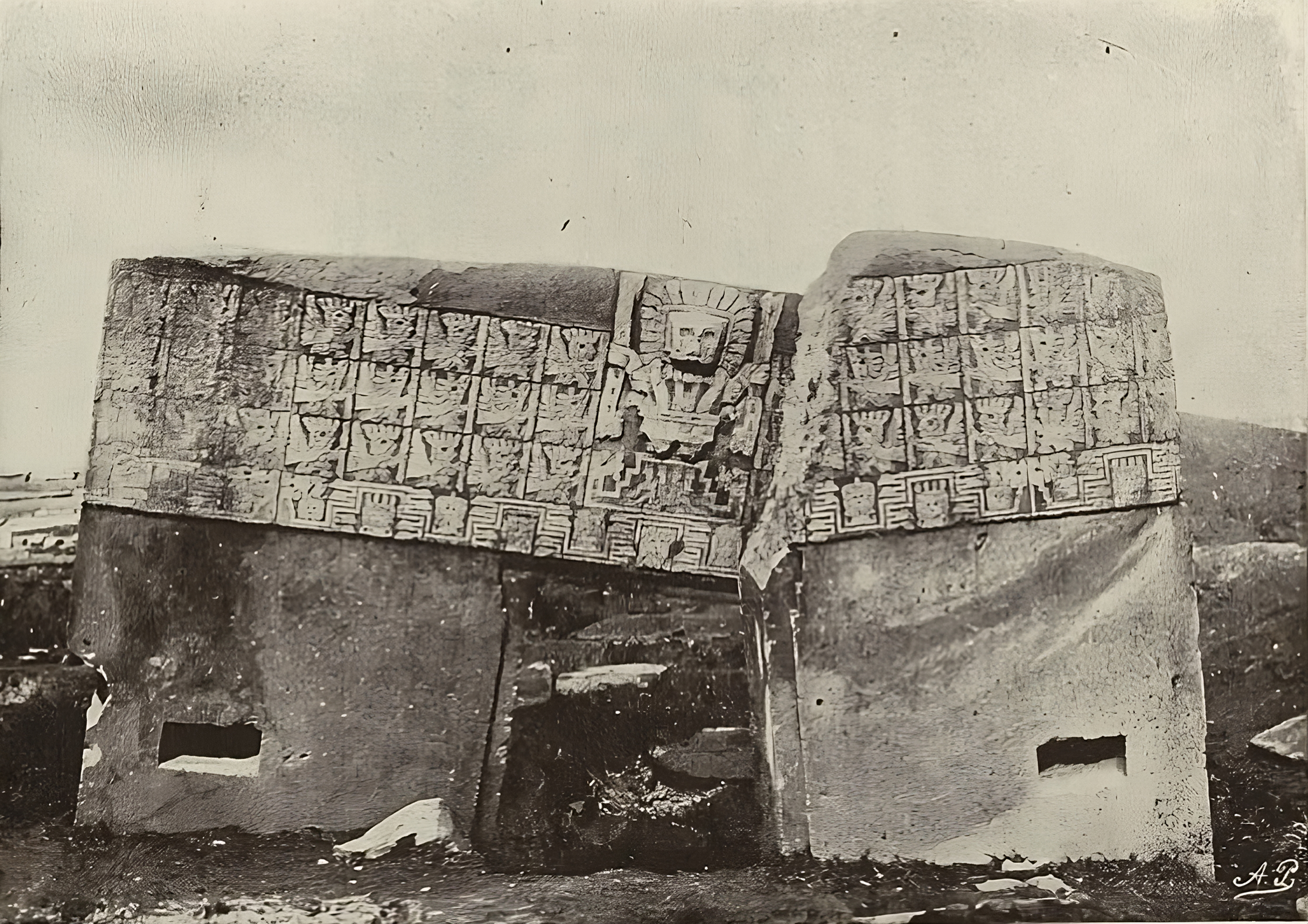
Gate of the Sun (1903)

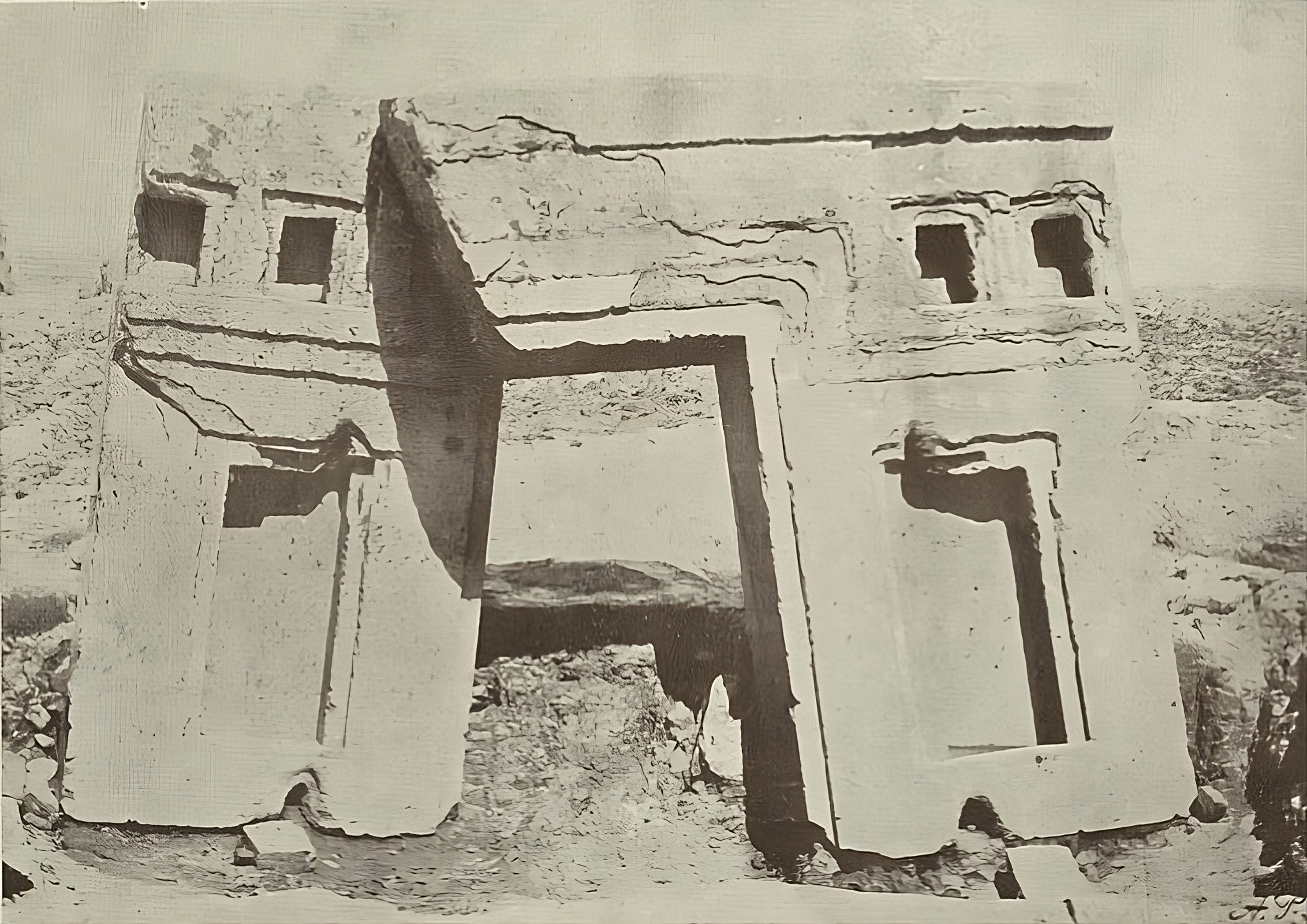
Gate of the Sun, Rear View (1903)

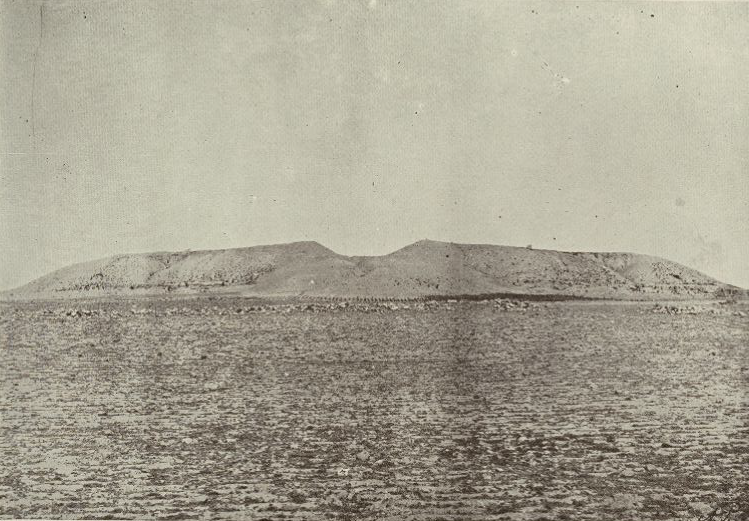
Akapana (1903); first thought to be an alluvial layer, later shown to be entirely artificial

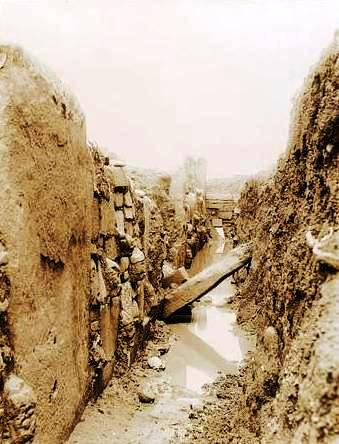
Semi-Subterranean Temple (1903)

=== Contemporary excavation and restoration ===
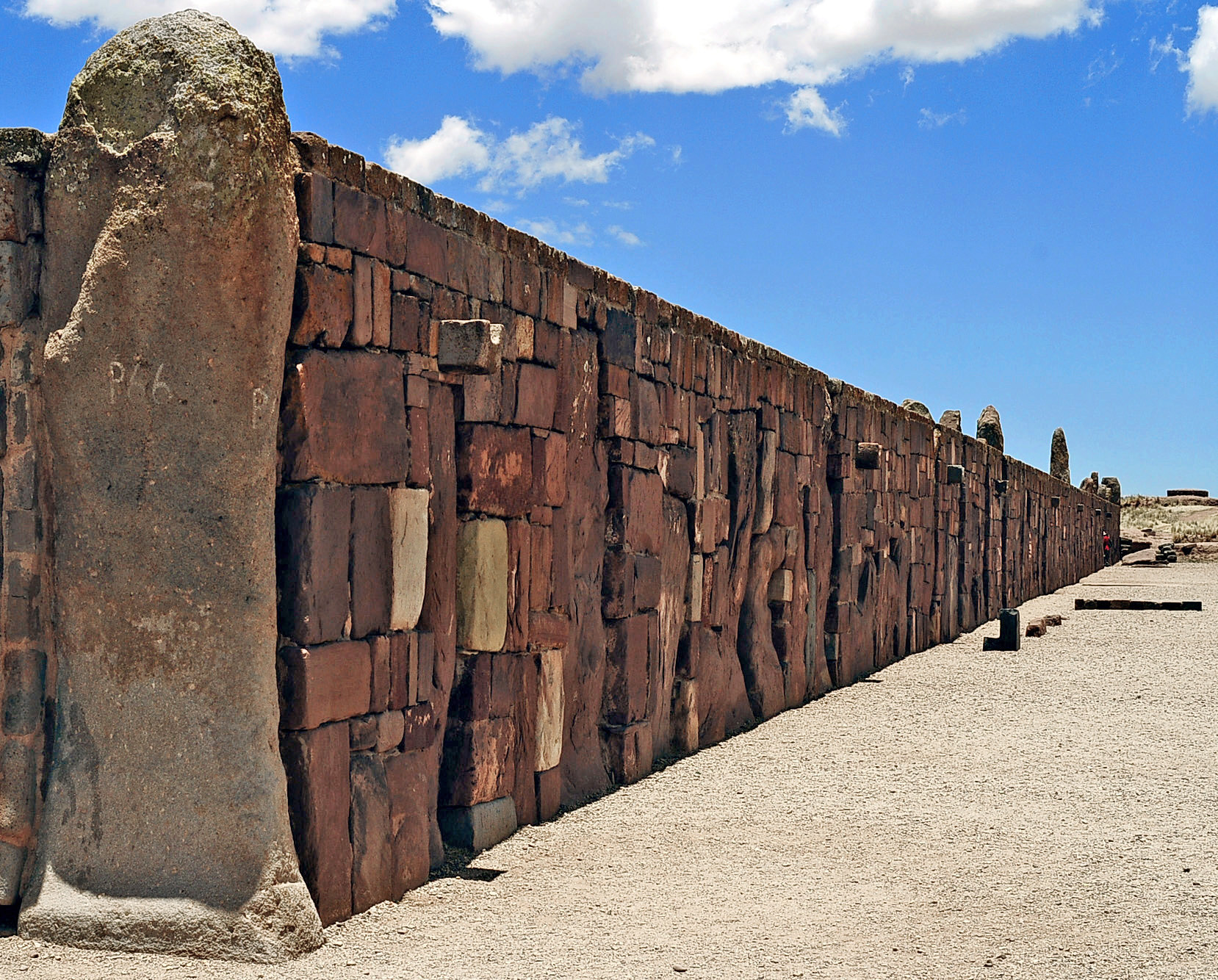
Amateur archaeological reconstructed Walls around the Kalasasaya

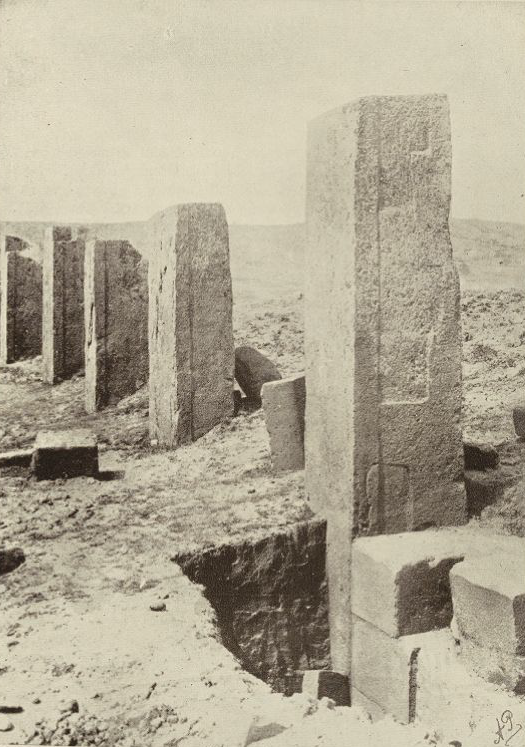
Remains of the original Kalasasaya walls show high quality of stonework

In the 1960s, the Bolivian government initiated an effort to restore the site and reconstruct part of it. The walls of the Kalasasaya are almost all reconstructed. The reconstruction was not sufficiently based on evidence. The reconstruction does not have as high quality of stonework as was present in Tiwanaku. Early visitors compared Kalasasaya to Englands Stonehenge. Ephraim Squier called it "American Stonehenge". Before the reconstruction, it had more of a "Stonehenge"-like appearance as the filler stones between the large stone pillars were all looted.

As noted, the Gateway of the Sun, now in the Kalasasaya, is believed to have been moved from its original location.

Modern, academically sound archaeological excavations were performed from 1978 through the 1990s by University of Chicago anthropologist Alan Kolata and his Bolivian counterpart, Oswaldo Rivera. Among their contributions are the rediscovery of the suka kollus, accurate dating of the civilization's growth and influence, and evidence for a drought-based collapse of the Tiwanaku civilization.

Archaeologists such as Paul Goldstein have argued that the Tiwanaku empire ranged outside of the altiplano area and into the Moquegua Valley in Peru. Excavations at Omo settlements show signs of similar architecture characteristic of Tiwanaku, such as a temple and terraced mound. Evidence of similar types of cranial vault modification in burials between the Omo site and the main site of Tiwanaku is also being used for this argument.

Robotic exploration of a newly discovered tunnel inside Akapana, June 13, 2006

Today Tiwanaku has been designated as a UNESCO World Heritage Site, administered by the Bolivian government.

Recently, the Department of Archaeology of Bolivia (DINAR, directed by Javier Escalante) has been conducting excavations on the terraced platform mound Akapana. The Proyecto Arqueologico Pumapunku-Akapana (Pumapunku-Akapana Archaeological Project, PAPA) run by the University of Pennsylvania, has been excavating in the area surrounding the terraced platform mound for the past few years, and also conducting Ground Penetrating Radar surveys of the area.

In former years, an archaeological field school offered through Harvard's Summer School Program, conducted in the residential area outside the monumental core, has provoked controversy amongst local archaeologists. The program was directed by Gary Urton, of Harvard, who was an expert on quipus, and Alexei Vranich of the University of Pennsylvania. The controversy was over allowing a team of untrained students to work on the site, even under professional supervision. It was so important that only certified professional archaeologists with documented funding were allowed access. The controversy was charged with nationalistic and political undertones. The Harvard field school lasted for three years, beginning in 2004 and ending in 2007. The project was not renewed in subsequent years, nor was permission sought to do so.

In 2009 state-sponsored restoration work on Akapana was halted due to a complaint from UNESCO. The restoration had consisted of facing the platform mound with adobe, although researchers had not established this as appropriate.

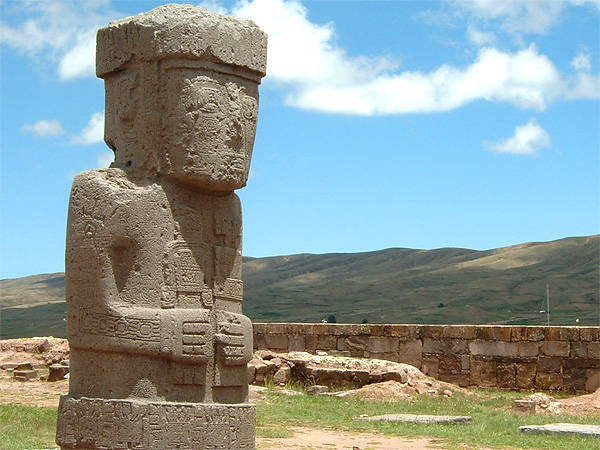
Detail of the Ponce Monolith

In 2013, marine archaeologists exploring Lake Titicaca's Khoa reef discovered an ancient ceremonial site and lifted artifacts such as a lapis lazuli and ceramic figurines, incense burners and a ceremonial medallion from the lake floor. The artifacts are representative of the lavishness of the ceremonies and the Tiwanaku culture.

When a topographical map of the site was created in 2016 by the use of drone imaging, a "set of hitherto unknown structures" was revealed. These structures spanned over 411 hectares (1,020 acres), and included a stone temple covering 17 hectares (42 acres) and about one hundred circular or rectangular structures of vast dimensions, which were possibly domestic units, as well as canal and road infrastructure.

== Aerial surveillance ==
Between 2005 and 2007 various types of aerial surveillance methods were used by UNESCO to create an aerial picture of the site. Lidar, aerial photography, drones, and terrestrial laser scanning were all used in this process. Data concluded from this research includes topographical maps that show the principal structures at the site along with mapping of multiple structures in the Mollo Kuntu area. Over 300 million data points were placed from these methods and have helped redefine main structures that have not fully been excavated such as the Puma Punku.

== Important authors ==
Alan Kolata of the University of Chicago conducted research at Tiwanaku in the late 1900s from which he made descriptions of the City and its structure and culture in his book The Tiwanaku. He later published Valley of The Spirits which described more aspects of Tiwanaku culture such as astrology and mythology.

John Wayne Janusek of Vanderbilt University spent time in the late 1900s as well at the site of Tiwanaku recording findings of the excavations going on. In 2008 he published Ancient Tiwanaku which described his findings on the architecture, agriculture and other aspects of Tiwanaku life.

Jean-Pierre Protzen was an architecture professor of the University of California at Berkeley and spent much of his life studying the architecture of Tiwanaku. In 2013, he collaborated with Stella Nair (Art and Architecture Ph.D and professor) to publish The Stones of Tiahuanaco which gives great descriptions of the architecture and stonework seen at Tiwanaku. Their research there included experimental archeology replicating some of the stone cuts seen at the site. Their work played a major role in creating potential reconstructions of what many of the structures look like, especially the Puma Punku.

== See also ==
- Pokotia Monolith
- Kimsa Chata
- Las Ánimas complex
- List of megalithic sites
- List of World Heritage Sites in South America
- Qhunqhu Wankani
- Wari Empire

== Bibliography ==
- Bermann, Marc Lukurmata Princeton University Press (1994) ISBN 978-0-691-03359-4.
- Bruhns, Karen Olsen, Ancient South America, Cambridge University Press, Cambridge, UK, c. 1994.
- Arthur Posnansky; Tihuanacu cuna del hombre americano (edición bilingüe inglés-castellano); Nueva York, 1945.
- Goldstein, Paul, "Tiwanaku Temples and State Expansion: A Tiwanaku Sunken-Court Temple in Moduegua, Peru", Latin American Antiquity, Vol. 4, No. 1 (March 1993), pp. 22–47, Society for American Archaeology.
- Hoshower, Lisa M., Jane E. Buikstra, Paul S. Goldstein, and Ann D. Webster, "Artificial Cranial Deformation at the Omo M10 Site: A Tiwanaku Complex from the Moquegua Valley, Peru", Latin American Antiquity, Vol. 6, No. 2 (June, 1995) pp. 145–64, Society for American Archaeology.
- Janusek, John Wayne Ancient Tiwanaku Cambridge University Press (2008) ISBN 978-0-521-01662-9.
- Kolata, Alan L., "The Agricultural Foundations of the Tiwanaku State: A View from the Heartland", American Antiquity, Vol. 51, No. 4 (October 1986), pp. 748–762, Society for American Archaeology.
- Kolata, Alan L (June 1991), "The Technology and Organization of Agricultural Production in the Tiwanaku State", Latin American Antiquity, 2 (2), Society for American Archaeology: 99–125, doi:10.2307/972273, JSTOR 972273, S2CID 3812420.
- Protzen, Jean-Pierre and Stella E. Nair, "On Reconstructing Tiwanaku Architecture", The Journal of the Society of Architectural Historians, Vol. 59, No. 3 (September 2000), pp. 358–71, Society of Architectural Historians.
- Reinhard, Johan, "Chavin and Tiahuanaco: A New Look at Two Andean Ceremonial Centers." National Geographic Research 1(3): 395–422, 1985.
- ——— (1990), "Tiahuanaco, Sacred Center of the Andes", in McFarren, Peter (ed.), An Insider's Guide to Bolivia, La Paz, pp. 151–81.
- ——— (1992), "Tiwanaku: Ensayo sobre su cosmovisión" [Tiwanaku: essay on its cosmovision], Revista Pumapunku (in Spanish), 2: 8–66.
- Stone-Miller, Rebecca (2002) [c. 1995], Art of the Andes: from Chavin to Inca, London: Thames & Hudson.
- Vallières, Claudine (2013). A Taste of Tiwanaku: Daily Life in an Ancient Andean Urban Center as Seen through Cuisine (Ph.D.). McGill University.
