= Arthur Posnansky =

Viennese-born Bolivian explorer and writer

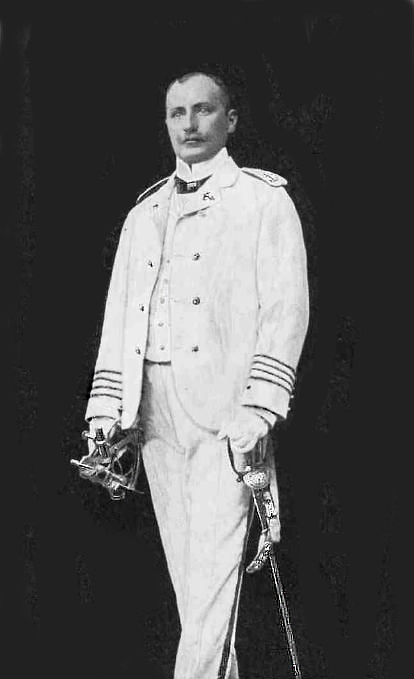
Photograph of Arthur Posnansky from Campaña del Acre: la lancha "Iris"; aventuras y peregrinaciones

Arthur Posnansky (1873–1946), often called "Arturo", was an Austrian engineer, explorer, ship’s navigator, entrepreneur, La Paz city council member, and amateur archaeologist. During his lifetime, Posnansky was known as a prolific writer and researcher and for his active participation in the defense and development of Bolivia. He is well known for his books, including Tihuanacu, the Cradle of American Man, Campana de Acre, La Lancha "Iris", Die Osterinsel und ihre praehistorischen Monumente, and Razas y Monumentos Prehistóricos del Altiplano Andino. Many, if not most, of his theories have been rejected by modern scholars.

== Early life ==
He was born in Vienna, Austria, on April 13, 1873. He helped his father in his business as a manufacturing chemist. At this time, he was deeply involved in cognate studies. His interest in cognate studies ended when his father suddenly died. After his father's death, Posnansky studied at the Imperial and Royal Naval Academy of Pola for the position of Naval Military Engineer in the Austro-Hungarian Navy. During his time in the Naval Academy, he made several extensive training voyages, including to the Easter Islands in the South Pacific Ocean, as a part of his shipboard training. While on Easter Island, he made ethnological observations, which he later published as Die Osterinsel und ihre praehistorischen Monumente. Posnansky graduated from the Imperial and Royal Academy of Pola at age 18.

== Life in Brazil ==
At age 23 in 1896, Posnansky emigrated to South America. At first, he participated in various expeditions, which explored upper reaches of the Amazon River. During these expeditions, he became an experienced navigator of it and its tributaries. He used his expertise to become the director of a river navigation company, which was called La Empresa de Navegacao dos rios Purus e Acre. As captain and owner of the shallow-draught steamer and blockade runner, Iris, Posnansky rescued the survivors of the Acre garrison during the Acre Campaign in Brazil. This military campaign involved a dispute between Bolivia and Brazil over 191,000 km^{2} (74,000 sq mi) of territory on the Acre River. After being wounded and captured by Brazilian forces, he escaped and became a refugee in Europe. Because of his loyalty to and support of Bolivia in this conflict, he lost all of his properties in Brazil. His exploits during the Acre Campaign (1900-1901) are detailed in his book Campaña del Acre: la lancha "Iris"; aventuras y peregrinaciones

== Life in Bolivia ==
After being a refugee in Europe, Posnansky moved to Bolivia to claim compensation for his services to this country. After finding that any substantial reward was unattainable because of the bankrupt state of the Bolivian treasury, he devoted his talents towards building private businesses involved in mining and international trade. In time, he became a prosperous entrepreneur. During this time, Posnansky introduced the first car to Bolivia. Posnansky died in La Paz, Bolivia in 1946.

While his business ventures thrived, the Bolivian Government recognized Posnansky's service during the Acre Campaign. For his sacrifices in support of the Bolivian government, it first granted him the honorific title of Benemerito de la Patria (Worthy of the Nation) and full Bolivian citizenship. Later, it awarded him two gold medals, one in 1901, the other in 1903. In 1905, his government service continued when he was elected to La Paz City Council.

== Research ==
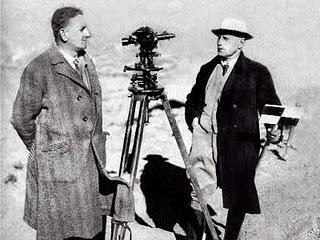
Arthur Posnansky with archaeologist Wendell C. Bennett

After settling in Bolivia, Posnansky repeatedly traveled the Bolivian and Peruvian highlands in efforts to locate, describe, and study Inca and pre-Inca archaeological sites. He was especially interested in those found along the shoreline and on the islands of Lake Titicaca. The results of these investigations were published in books such as The Islands of Titicaca and Koati and Rasas y monumentos prehistoricos del Altiplano Andino. For such research, the Bolivian Senate awarded him a gold medal in 1905 and he later became Director of the National Museum. He also authored books, which included Os Indios Paumaris e Ipurinas no rio Purus (1898) and Mapa del rio Acre (7 volumes, 1897), about South American geography and ethnology. He also lectured about archaeological subjects in Berlin, Frankfort, Nuremberg, and Treptow, Germany. In recognition of his accomplishments, the German government conferred on him an honorary title of Professor in 1914.

During the 1940s, Posnansky studied the site of Tiwanaku (Spanish: Tiahuanaco or Tiahuanacu), suggesting that the city was built during the ice age, before the great flood. He came to this conclusions because there he found human skeletons very close to the remains of fish and fossils of aquatic plants that normally grow in the depths of the lake.

Posnansky's final and most important book, Tihuanacu, the Cradle of American Man, was published in 1945 (volumes I and II) and 1957 (volumes III and IV). In it, Posnansky argued that Tiwanaku was constructed approximately 15,000 BC by American peoples, although not by the ancestors of those then living in the area, the Aymara. Posnansky also saw Tiwanaku as the origin point of civilization throughout the Americas, including the Inca, the Maya and others. Since the publication of the work, these ideas have since been disputed by later archaeological research. However, the photographs, detailed descriptions of structures and inscriptions, meticulously prepared maps, and numerous photographs found in this work constitute an extremely valuable historical record of the site. Posnansky's ideas about Tiwanaku having been a full-fledged city with a large permanent population, rather than only a seasonally occupied ceremonial center, and its abandonment having been the result of prehistoric climatic change are widely accepted in principle. This book and his personal efforts also contributed significantly to the eventual preservation of the site at a time when it was being very badly damaged by neglect, stone-quarrying, and looting.

== Additional references ==
- Ponce Sangines, C. (1999) Arthur Posnansky: Biografia Intelectual de un Pionero. La Paz: Producciones "CIMA"
- Schavclzon, Daniel (1996) "Arthur Posnansky y la Arquelogia Bolivinana:Una Bio-BibJiografia," Detrags tur Allgemeinen und Vergleichenden Archáeolgia, vol. 16, Verlag Philipp von Zahem, pp. 335-358.
