= Pukara culture =

South American archaeological culture

Pucará
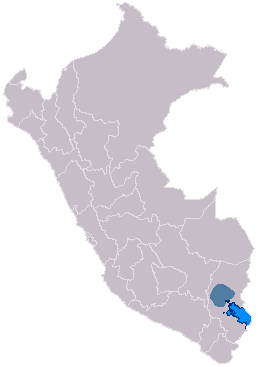
- Area of influence
- Geographical range: Puno, Qullaw
- Period: Formative
- Dates: c. 1400 BCE – c. 400 CE
- Type site: Pukara
- Preceded by: Jisk'a Iru Muqu
- Followed by: Tiwanaku Empire

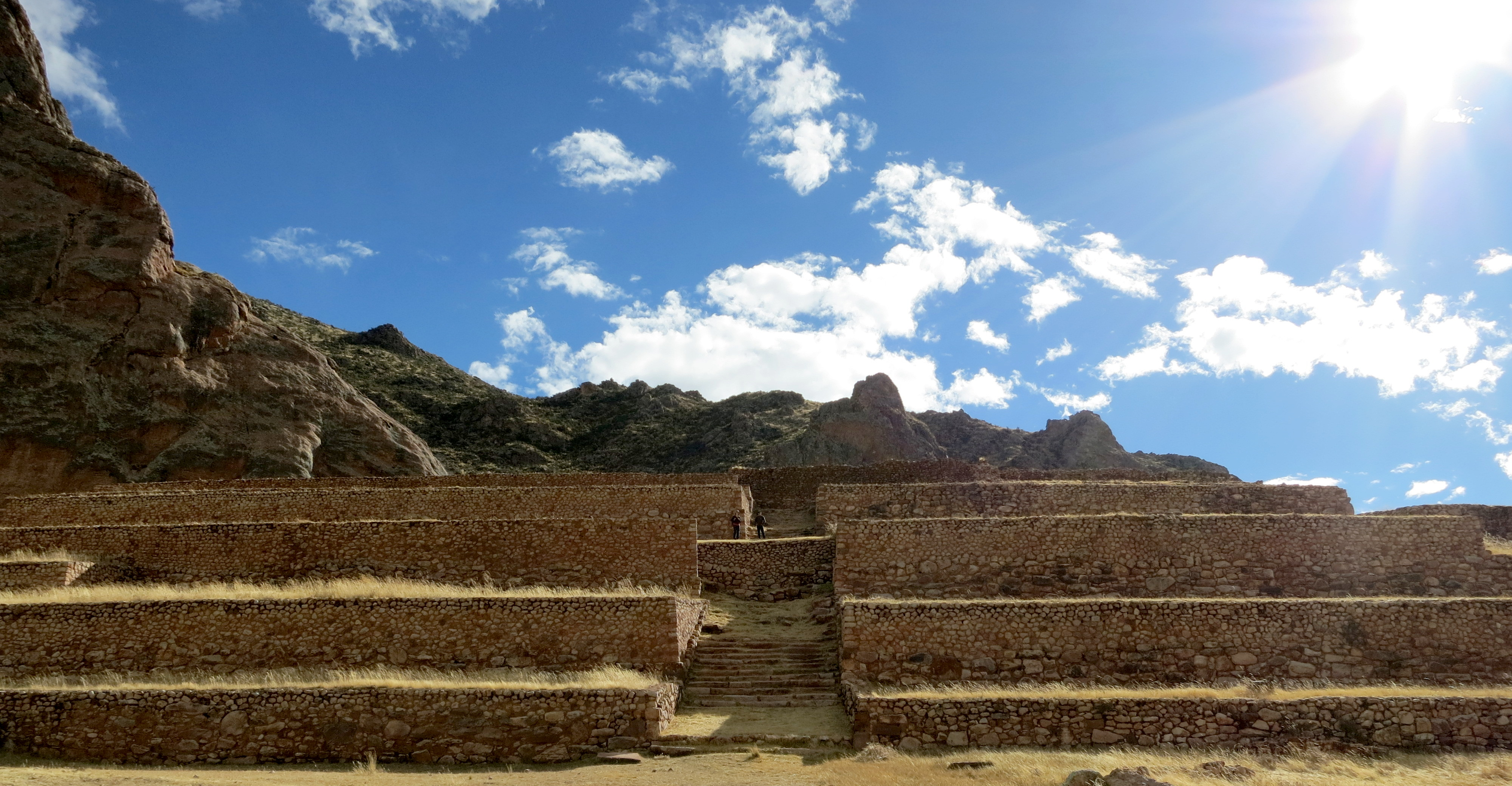
The archaeological site of Pukara

The Pukara or Pucará culture was an archaeological culture which developed in Qullaw, along the north-western shore of Lake Titicaca. It was characterized by a hierarchy of smaller centers and villages scattered throughout the northern basin of the Titicaca. The name originates from the town of Pukara, one of the largest settlements in the region. The modern town of Pucará is located half a mile to the east of the archaeological site. The Pukara culture is unrelated to the stone fortresses, pukaras, built across the Andes during the Inca Empire. Its sphere of influence reached as far north as the Cuzco Valley and as far south as Tiahuanaco. The culture had two phases of development within the Formative Period: the Middle Formative (1400 to 550 BC), and Late Formative (550 BC to 400 AD).

In 1925, Luis E. Valcárcel, considered the father of peruvian anthropology, was the first scholar to arrive at the town of Pucará to investigate the archaeological remains found on the outskirts of the city. This discovery was recorded in the University of Cusco Magazine No. 48, which indicates that the expedition took place between July 14 and 20, 1925. Valcárcel was accompanied by the judge, José Frisancho, and the prominent draftsman Victor Guillén

== Agriculture ==
The Pukara engaged in agriculture, herding, fishing, and domesticating the alpaca. Complex knowledge of hydraulics, and constructing ridges and furrows was required to ensure productive agriculture in the high-altitude environment. Q'ochas were natural and modified depressions in the earth that functioned as sunken gardens. Located near the Pucará River, the Pukara flooded the land with water before harvesting. Over a period of 3 to 5 years, agriculturalists would rotate between growing potatoes and quinoa. These strategies helped the Pukara establish settlements along the western slope of the Andes in the inter-Andean valley of Cuzco and Moquegua.

== Ceramics and sculpture ==
They developed, especially in the second phase, a very particular vigorous sculpture and ceramic culture. Pukara ceramics are painted in various colors. The fineware was painted with black and yellow paints on red clay and named the Classic Pukara Style. Incision lines define the shapes of humans, mythical creatures, tools, or shamanistic figures. Pukara pottery and textiles are found widely in the middle Andean, and the coastal Pacific valleys, reaching into Peru and Chile. Within the ceramic timeline of the Indigenous peoples of the Americas, the Classic Pukara Style is estimated to have peaked around 200 BCE, through 200 CE.

== The Pukara and Tiwanaku ==
The rise of Tiwanaku may have contributed to the weakening of the Pukara around 200 AD. The Pukara settlements were occupied by people from Tiwanaku. It's probable that the leaders of this social formation had taken the site of Pukara as a sacred place, and perhaps assumed it as their paqarina or place of origin. They copied Pucará's architectural model and commissioned a vast number of workers and engineers to transfer it to their capital in the Tiwanaku Valley, in the southern basin. It is possible that at that time, the sculptures of Pukará had become objects of great religious and ritual value, their possession being a symbol of power and prestige.

== See also ==
- Chiripa culture
- Wankarani culture
