= Pre-Columbian Precious Metals Museum =

Archeological museum in La Paz, Bolivia

Coordinates: 16°29′31.379″S 68°8′8.475″W

- Museo de Metales Preciosos Precolombinos
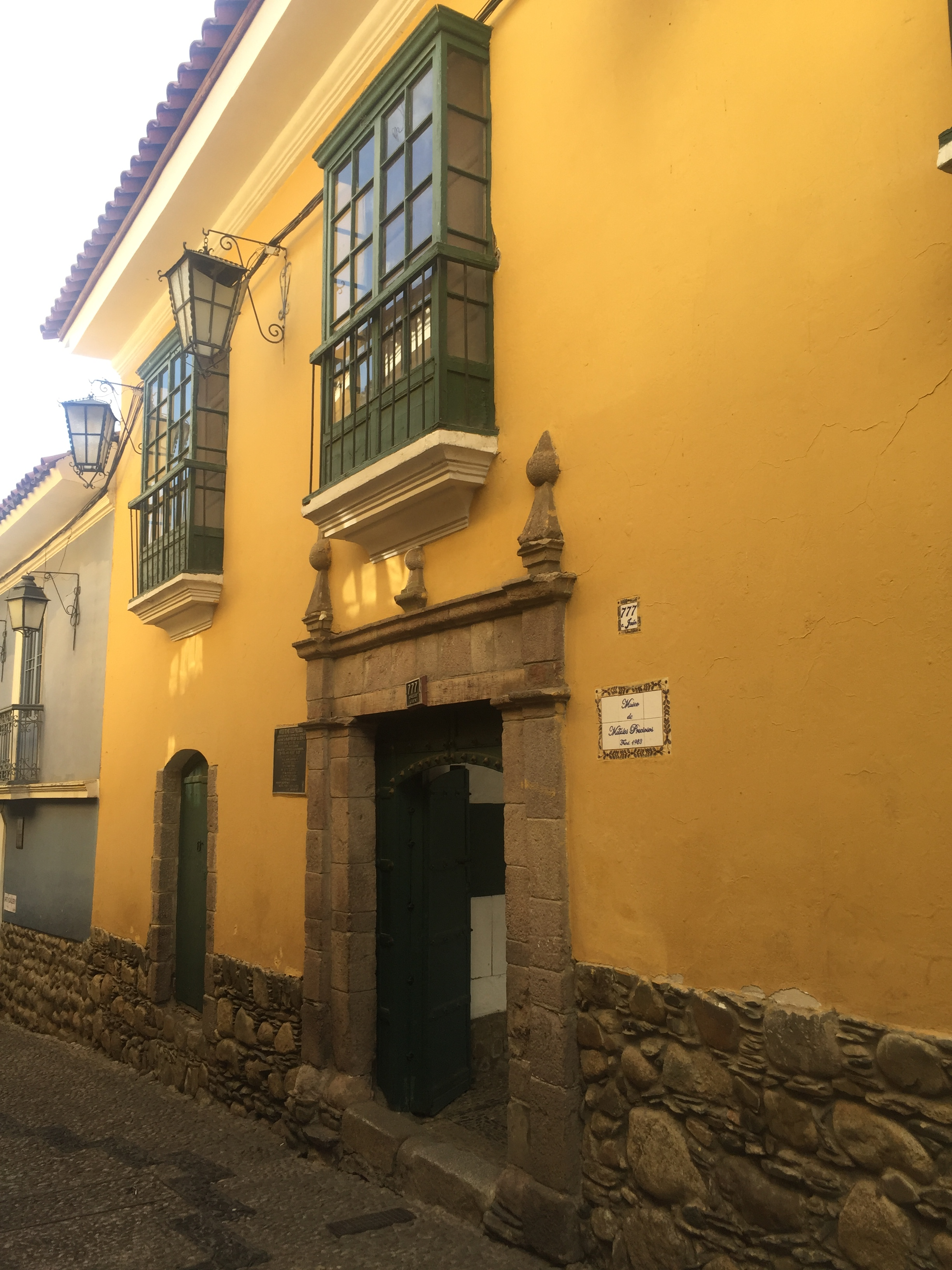
- Entrance to the museum on Jaen Street
- Interactive fullscreen map
- Established: 1984
- Location: 777, Jaén St, La Paz, Bolivia
- Type: Archaeological museum

The Pre-Columbian Precious Metals Museum is a museum located in the city of La Paz, Bolivia. This museum was inaugurated in 1984. It operates on Jaén Street, in a historic building that is part of Bolivia's cultural heritage, with monumental status.

== History ==
Fritz Buck, a German jeweler who migrated to Bolivia in the first half of the 20th century, initiated his collection with objects he bought in Peru, the country he first arrived in. Later, he settled in the city of La Paz, where he began working in his jewelry shop. He established himself in the Sopocachi neighborhood, where he exhibited his private collection. When the municipality of La Paz became aware of this, they requested the donation of his collection to the Municipal Museum Emeterio Díaz Villamil, the only one existing at that time. Buck rejected the request, so the municipal body proceeded to issue an expropriation order, from which Buck escaped by selling the collection on two occasions, first to his son and then to his wife. However, faced with the insistence of the municipal government, Buck decided to donate the collection to the Republic of Germany, which prepared to take it out of the country. After diplomatic discussions following the alarm raised by the municipal government and the death of Fritz Buck, the operation ended up being halted, with the sole condition from Germany being the construction of a special museum in the city of La Paz to house the collection.

== Building ==
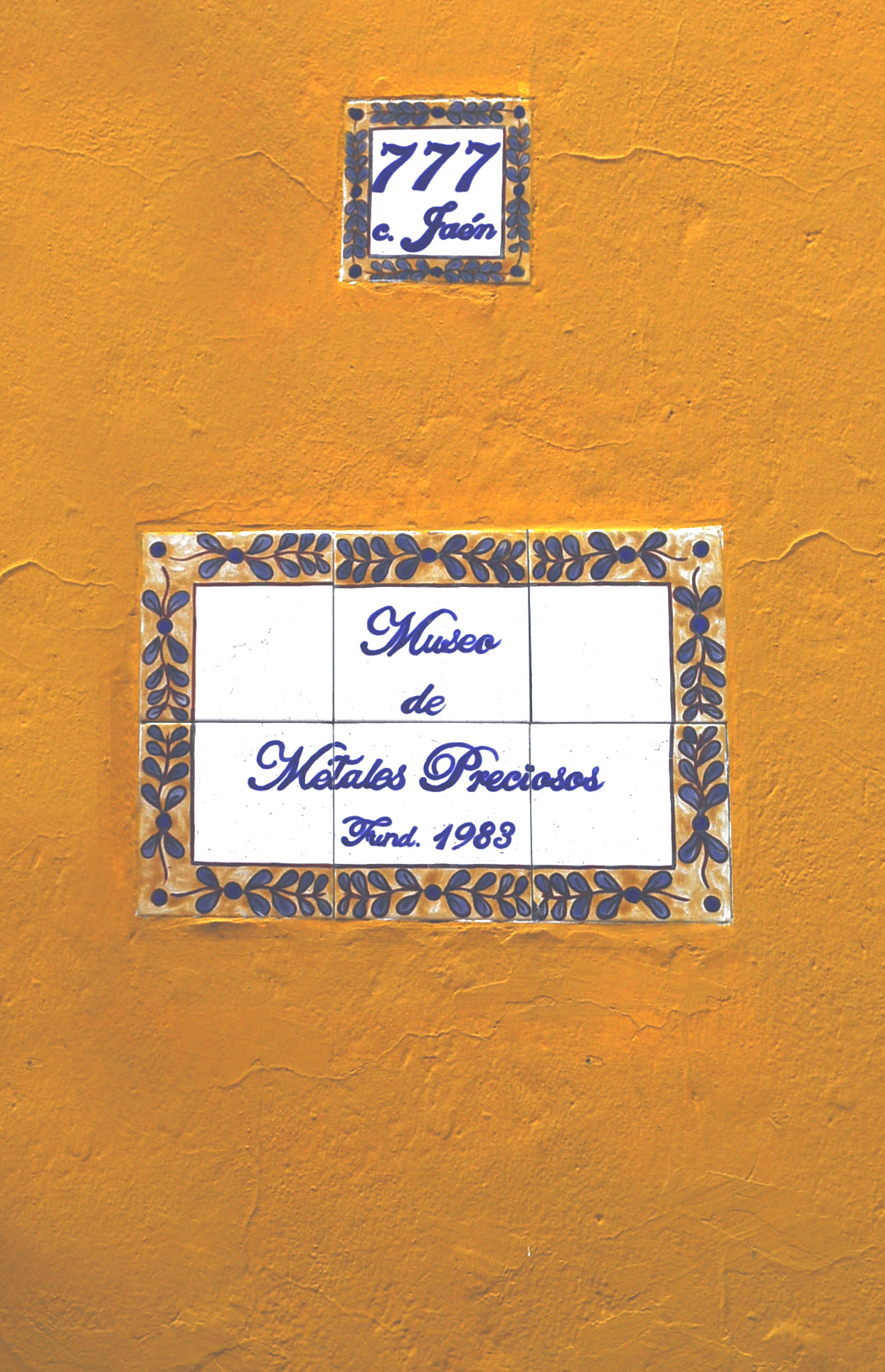
Plaque of the Museum

At that time, the possibility of building a museum as infrastructure to house a single collection did not exist, so the municipality determined that it would be located in the house that belonged to Apolinar Jaén, to adapt it to the requirements of a museum that would house this collection. Initially, it was called the "Gold Museum" ("Museo del Oro" in Spanish) before becoming the current "Pre-Columbian Precious Metals Museum."

== Collections ==
The museum has a collection of over 2000 pieces of stone, metal and ceramic. The gold room preserves valuable objects made of this metal, such as pectoral diadems, ear ornaments, blanket ornaments, and clothing, attributed to the Inca culture. The silver room houses objects of religious-ceremonial use from the Aymara, Mollo, Wankarani, Chiripa, Tiwanaku, and Inca cultures.

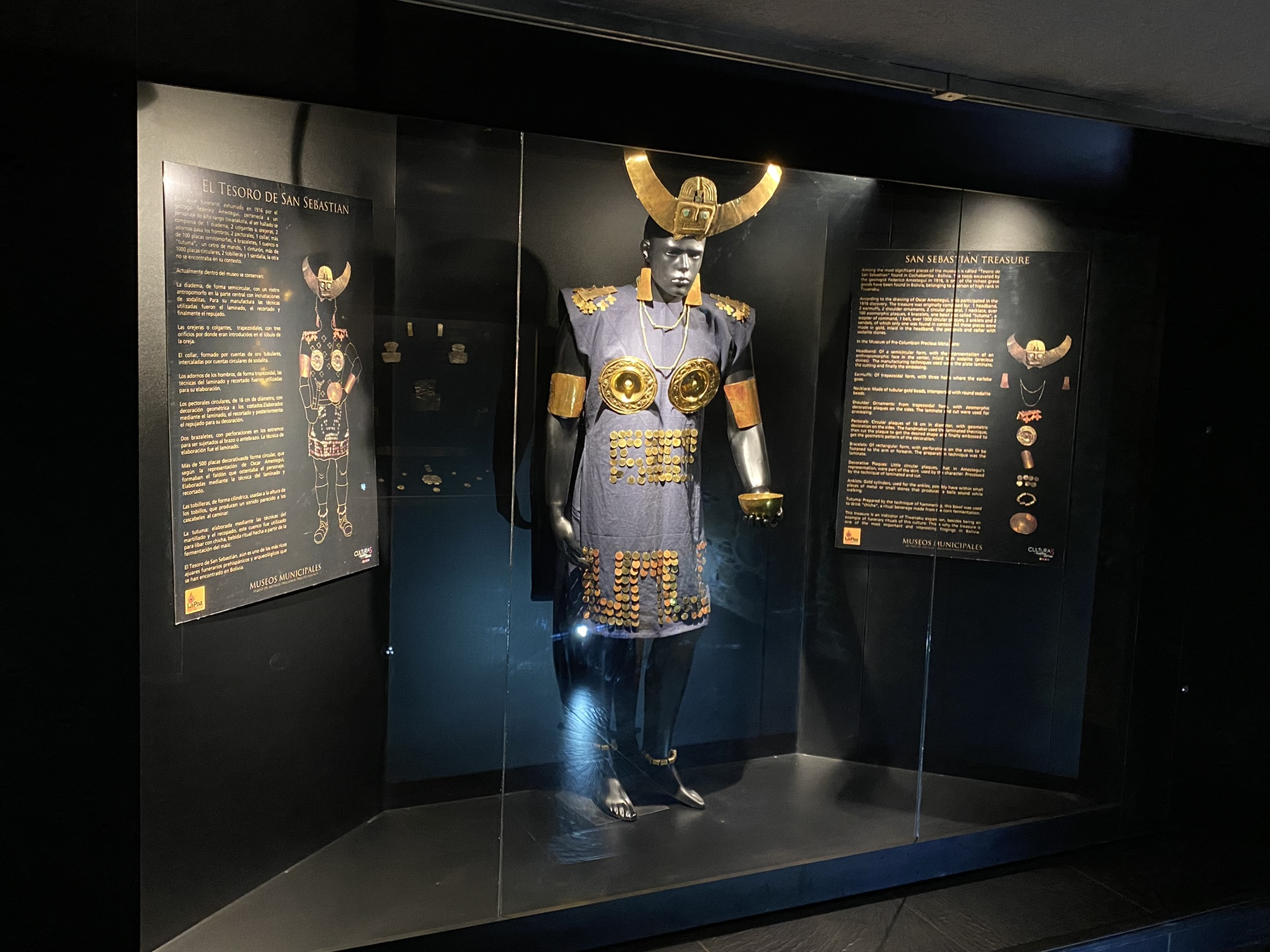
The Treasure of San Sebastián, exhibited at the Precious Metals Museum of La Paz, Bolivia

One of the most important collections housed in the museum is the Treasure of San Sebastián. Discovered in 1916 on the San Sebastián Hill in Cochabamba by the geologist Federico Améstegui, who, during a walk with his children, found nearly 1000 pre-Hispanic gold pieces that had been exposed by a storm. These pieces include a diadem, two pectorals, a container, two bracelets, 20 cylindrical beads, two loose trapezoidal plates, approximately 600 small sequins, two sheets with seven pendants each, twelve loose pendants, and 24 tubules, as well as several circular sodalite beads, a scepter, two bracelets, a belt, a single sandal, and approximately 500 more sequins, which have since been lost. The Améstegui family displayed the collection in their home until they ended up in the possession of Rodolphe Picard, a French citizen who in 1933 was discovered trying to smuggle the jewels out of Bolivia. They were then placed in the custody of the Central Bank of Bolivia until the more than 700 pieces of the collection were entrusted to the Precious Metals Museum of La Paz. Their origin is unknown, but it is believed that the collection corresponds to a Tiwanaku tomb.

The museum also exhibits the "Fuente Magna", an intriguing ceramic artifact discovered near Lake Titicaca in Bolivia. This artifact has attracted significant attention due to the controversial inscriptions it bears, which some scholars claim are in proto-Sumerian script.

== Gallery ==
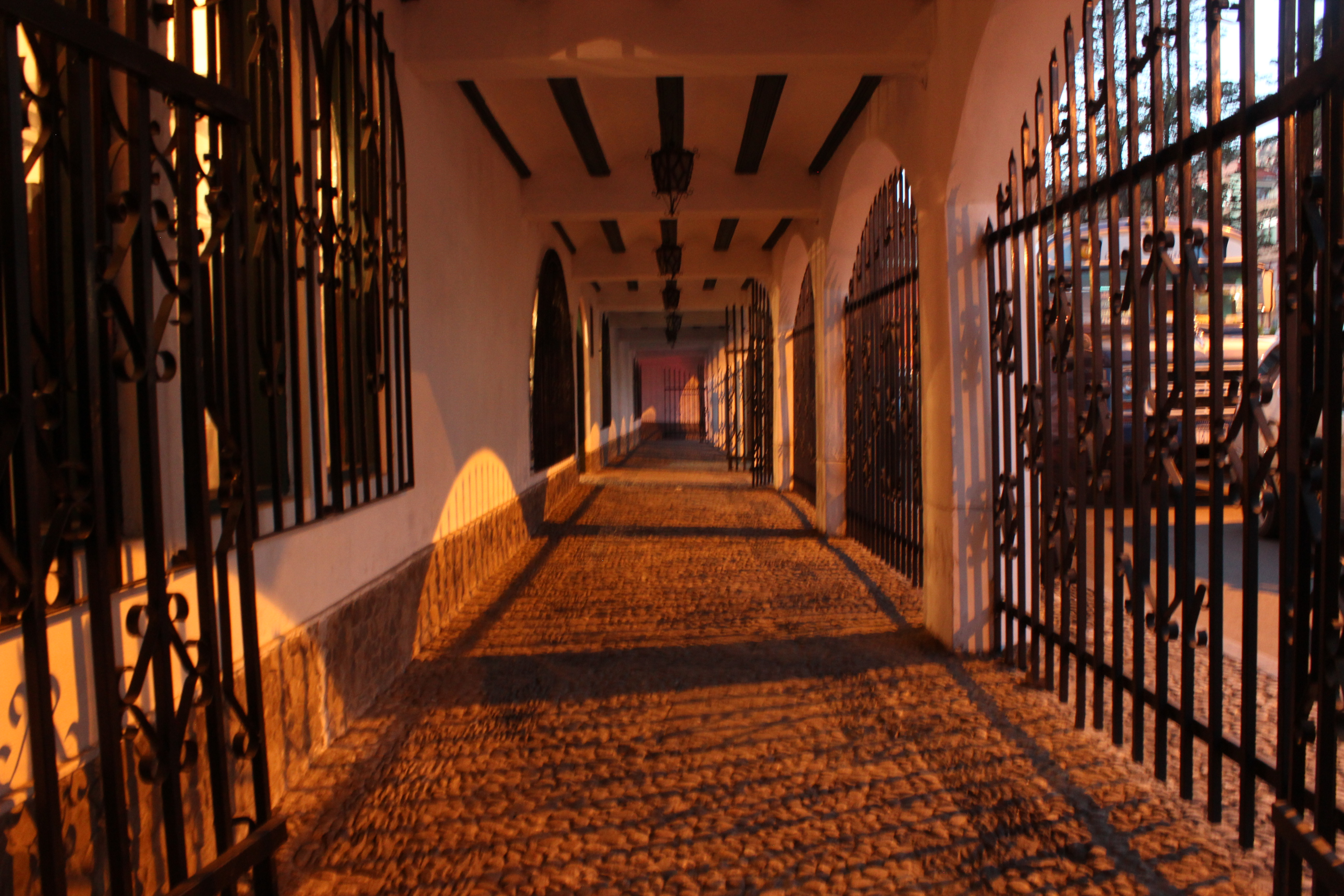

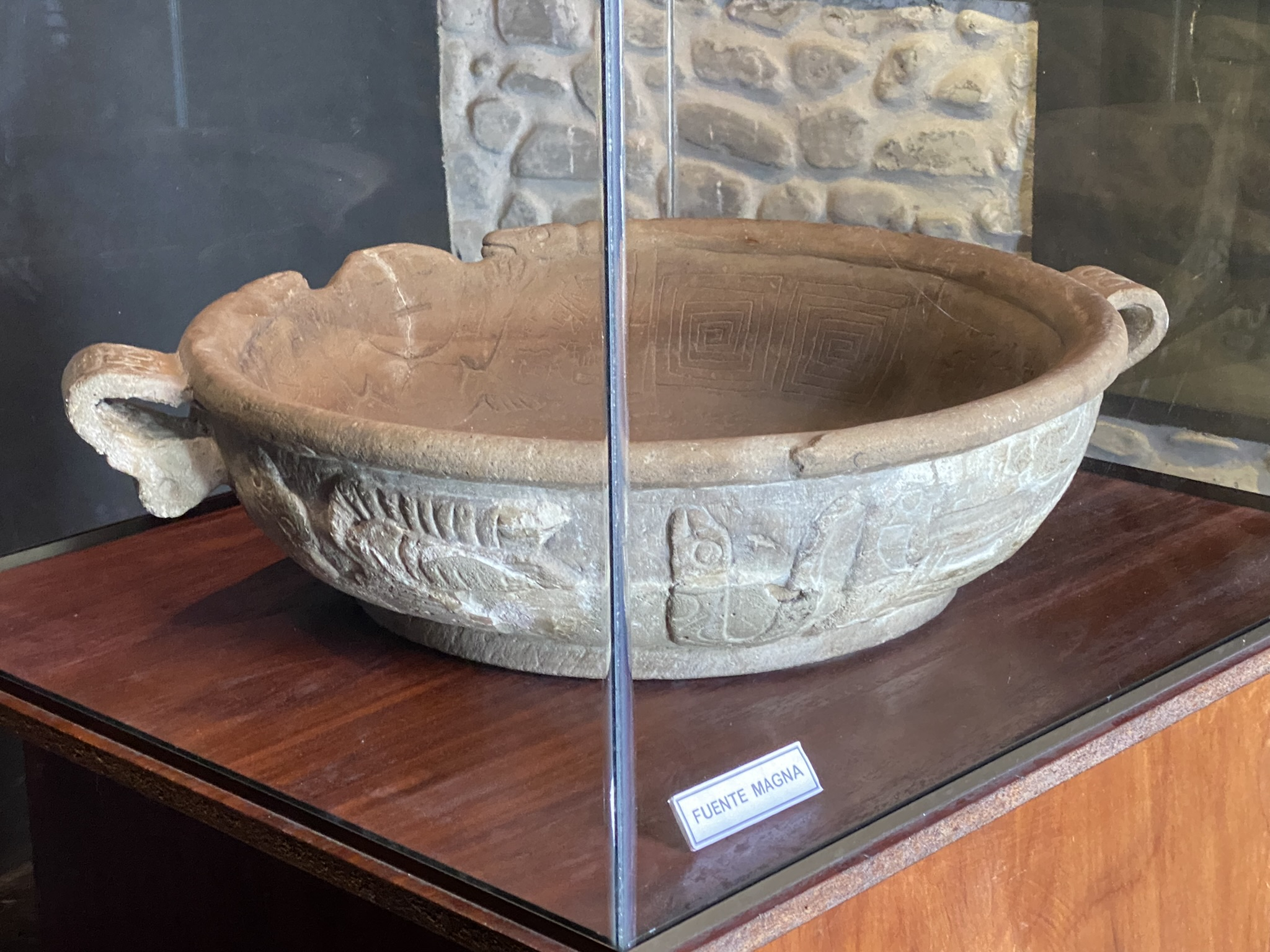

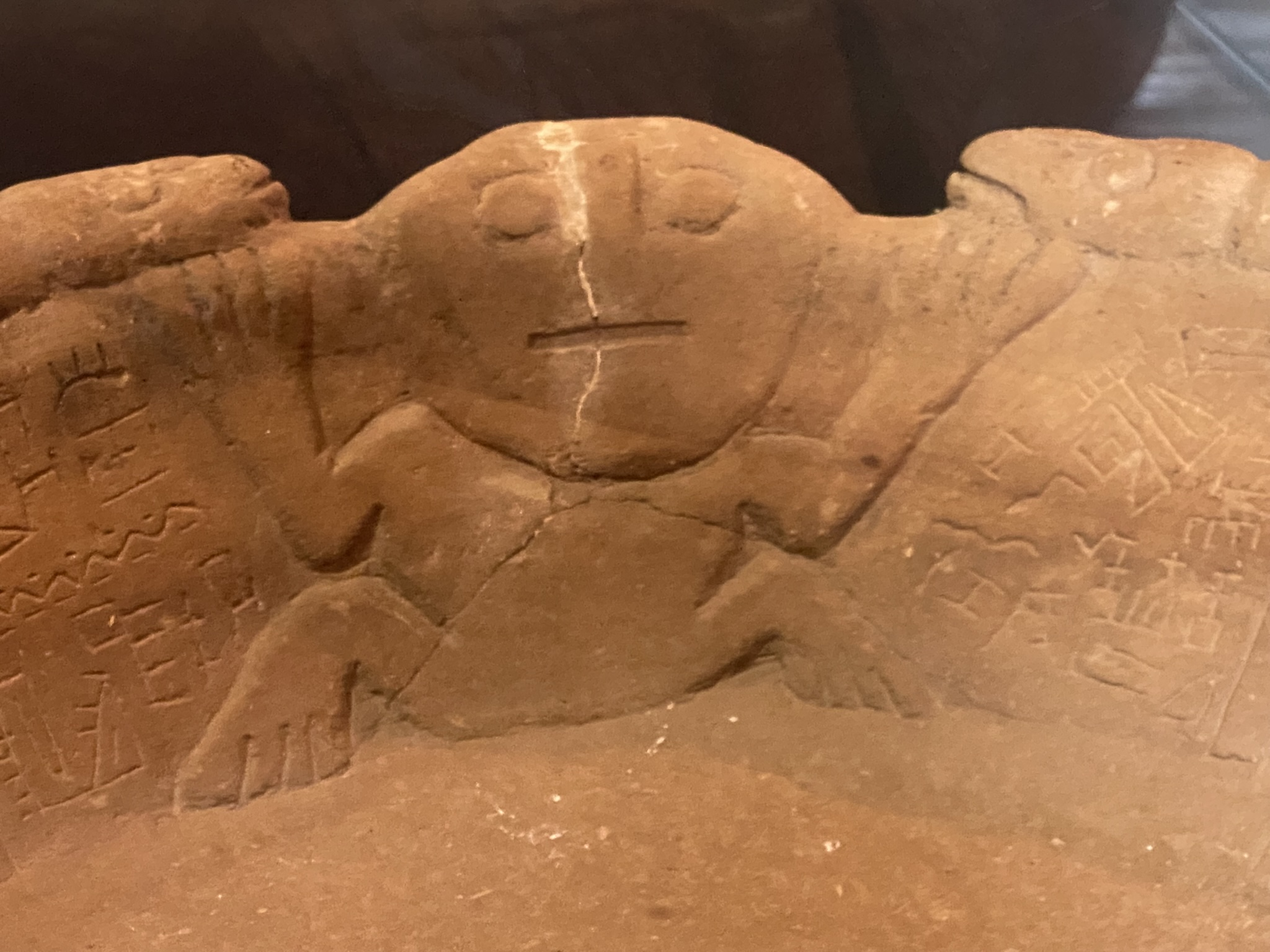

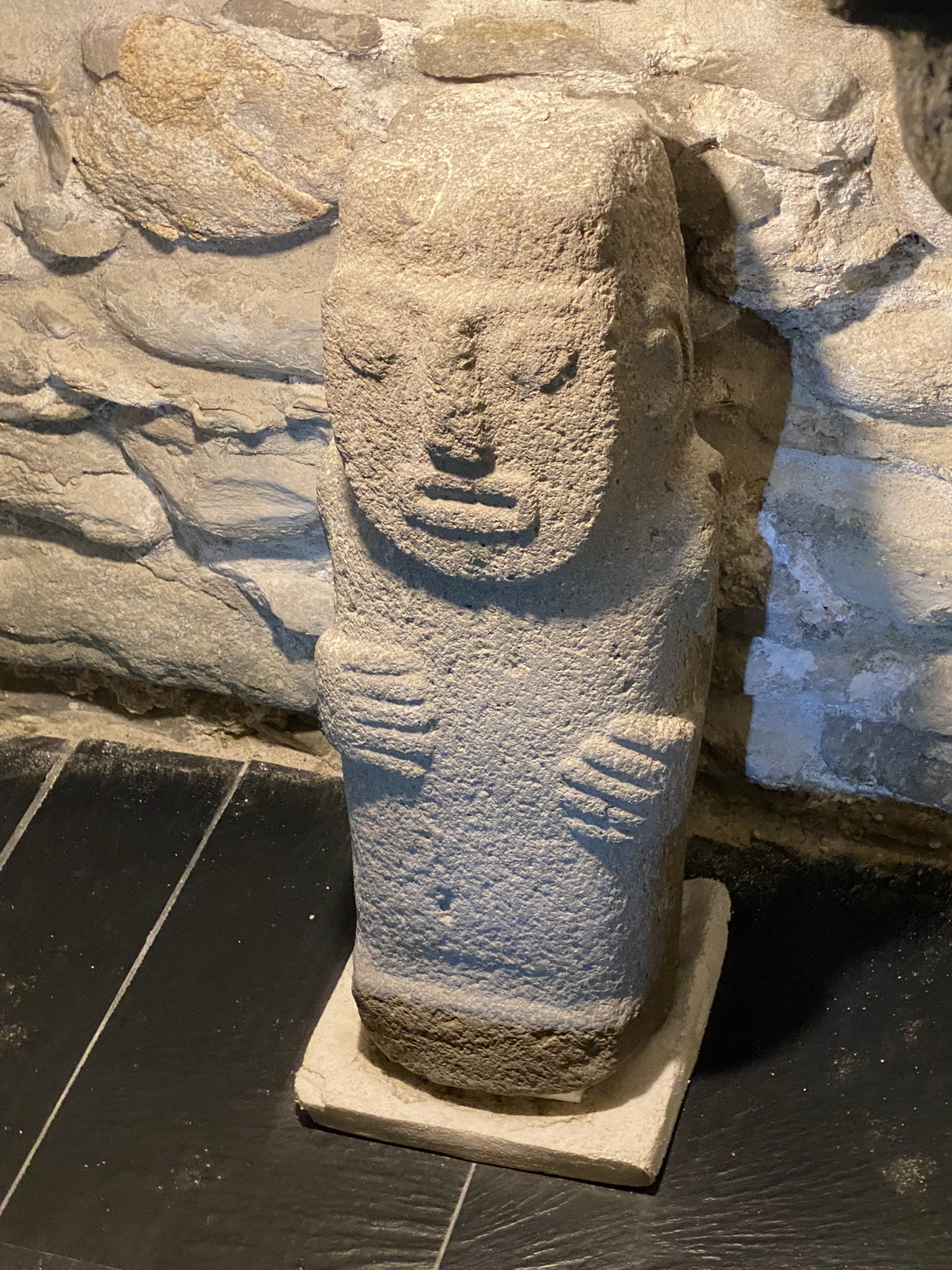

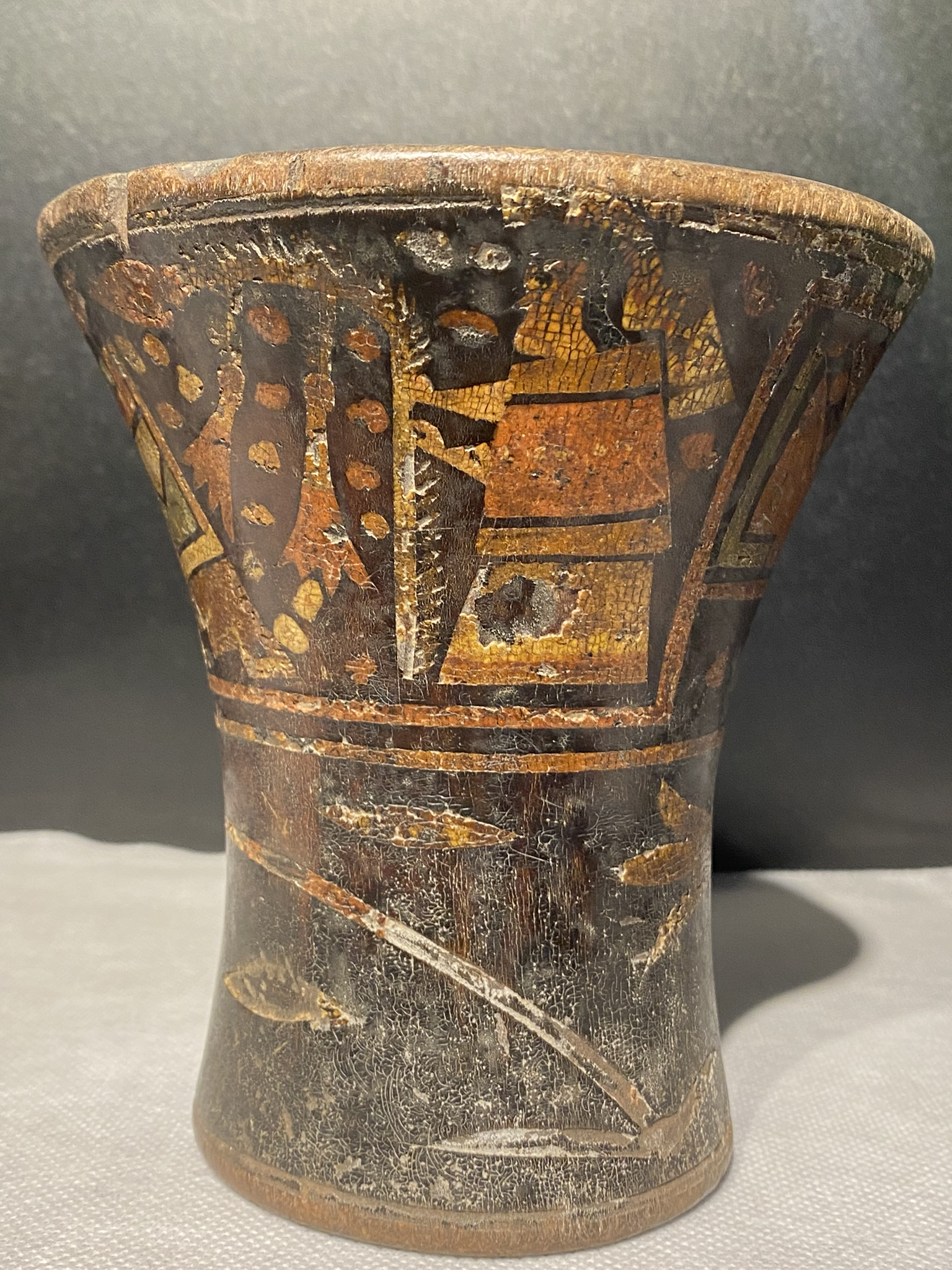

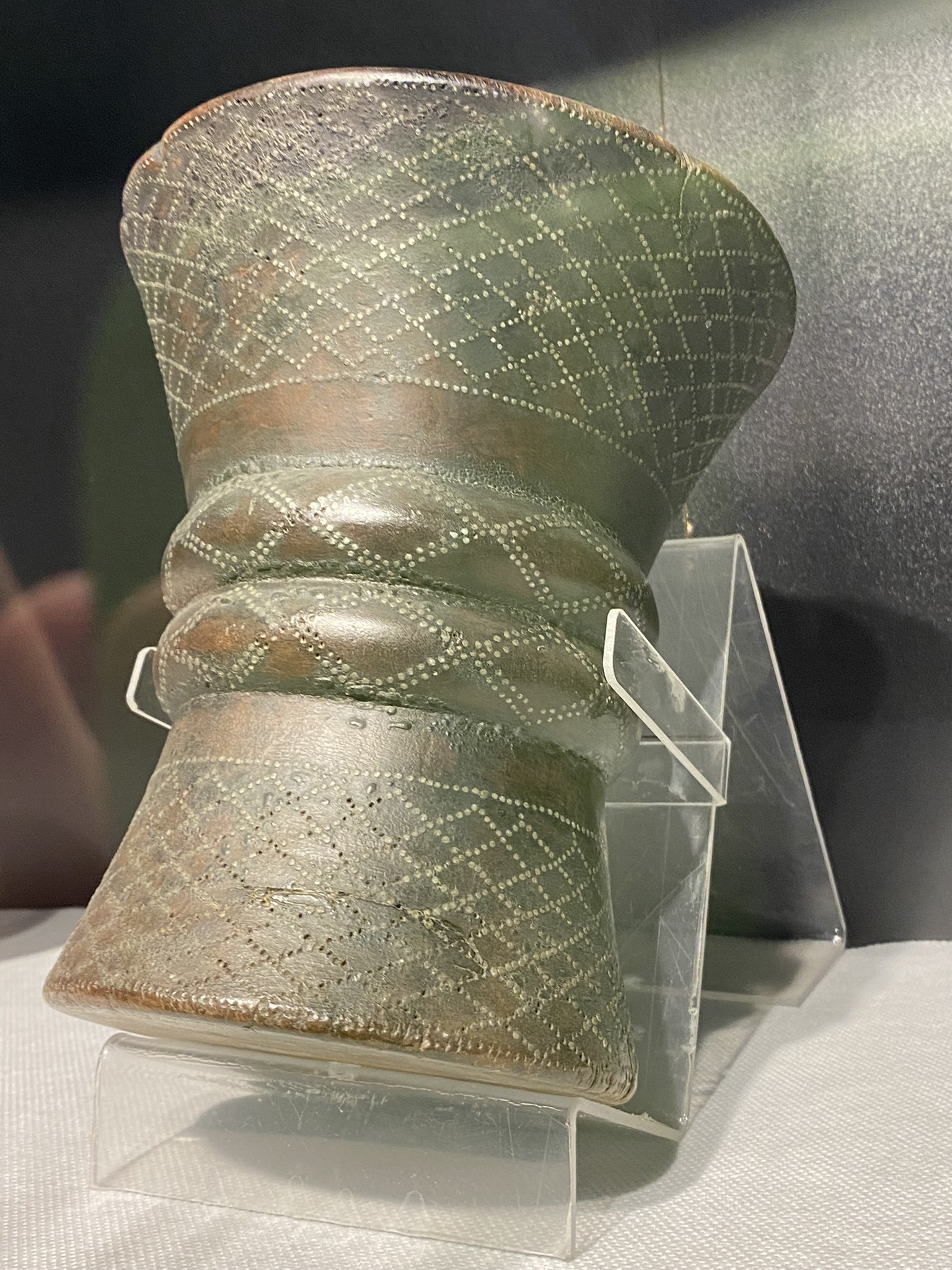

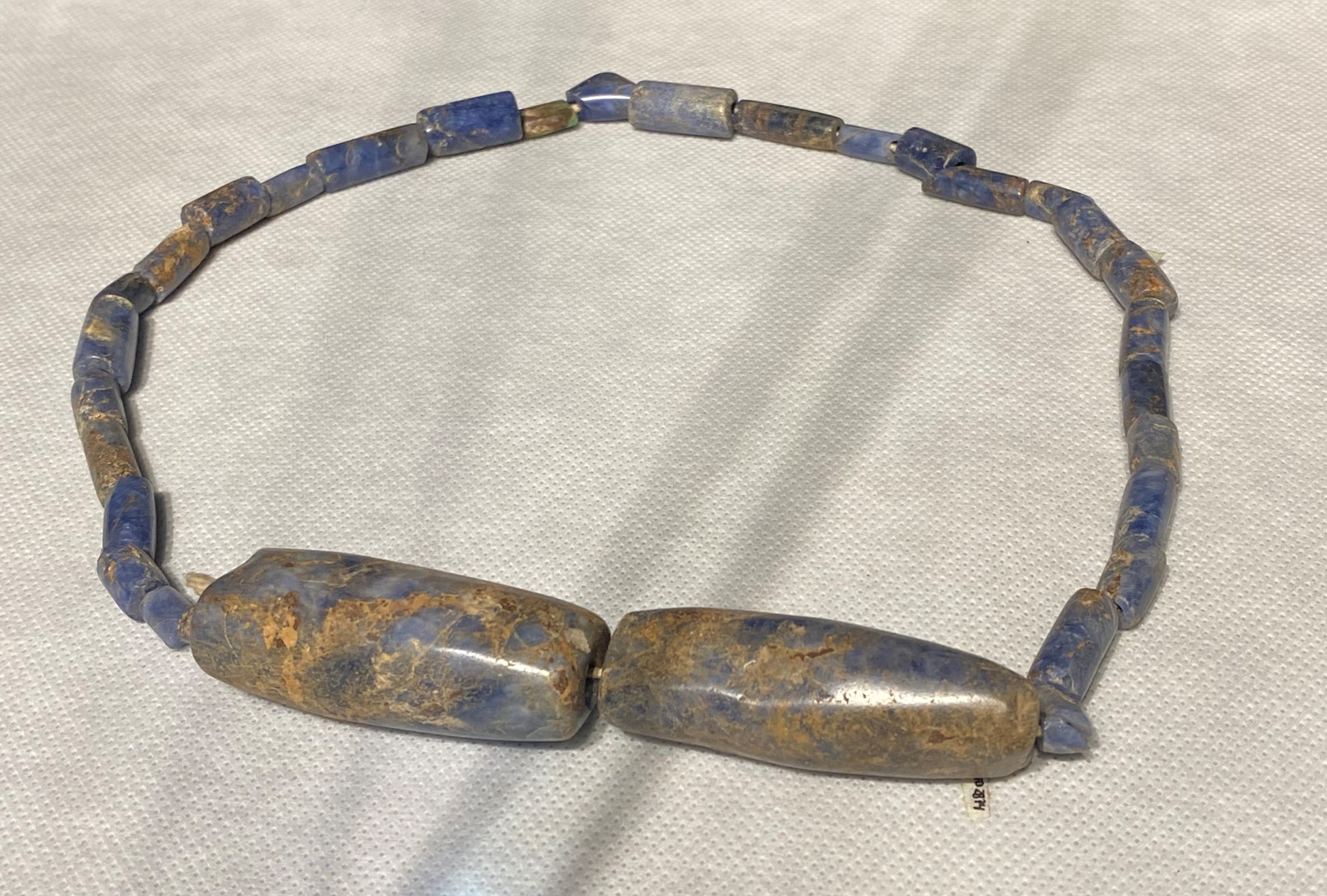

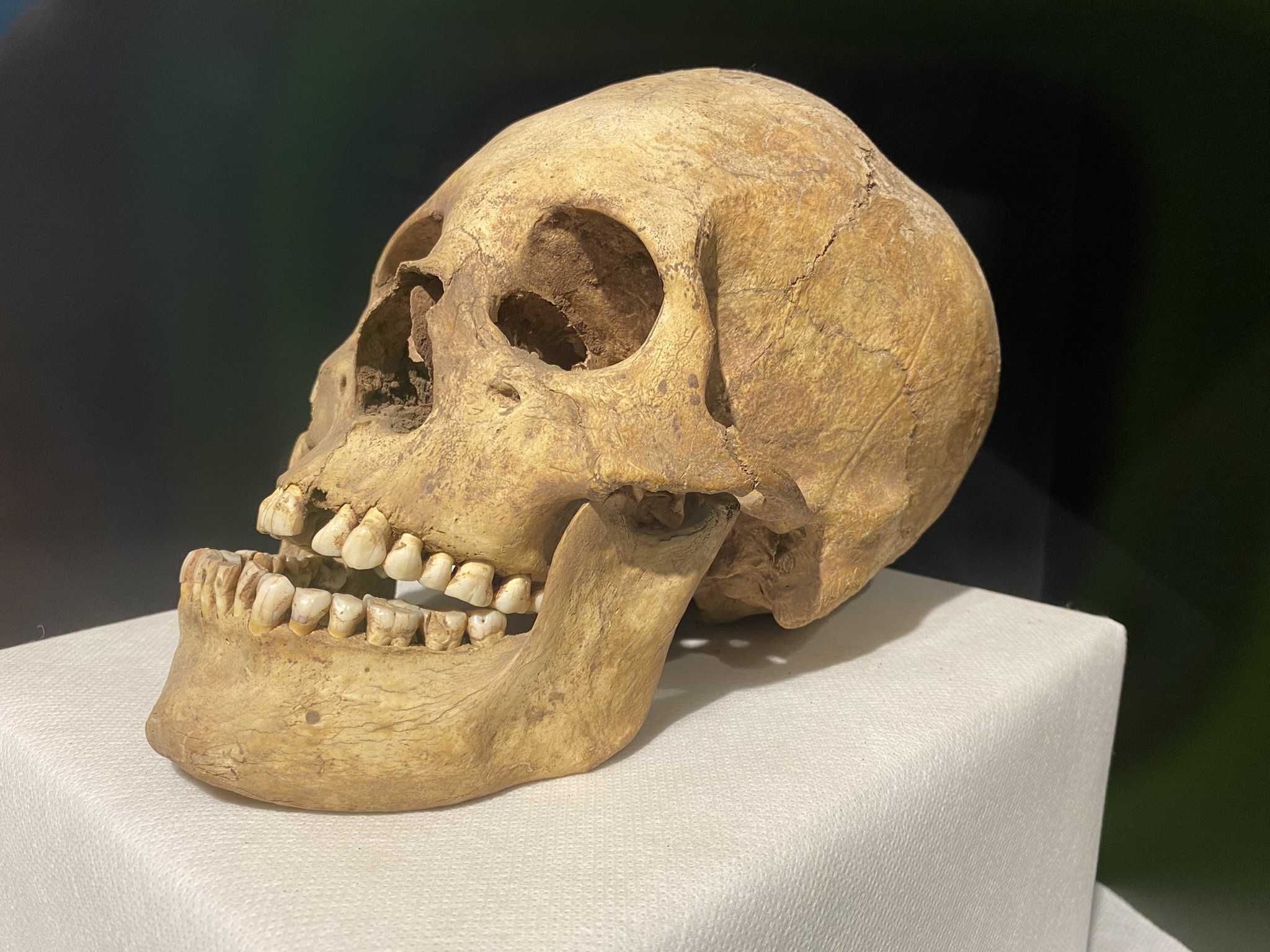

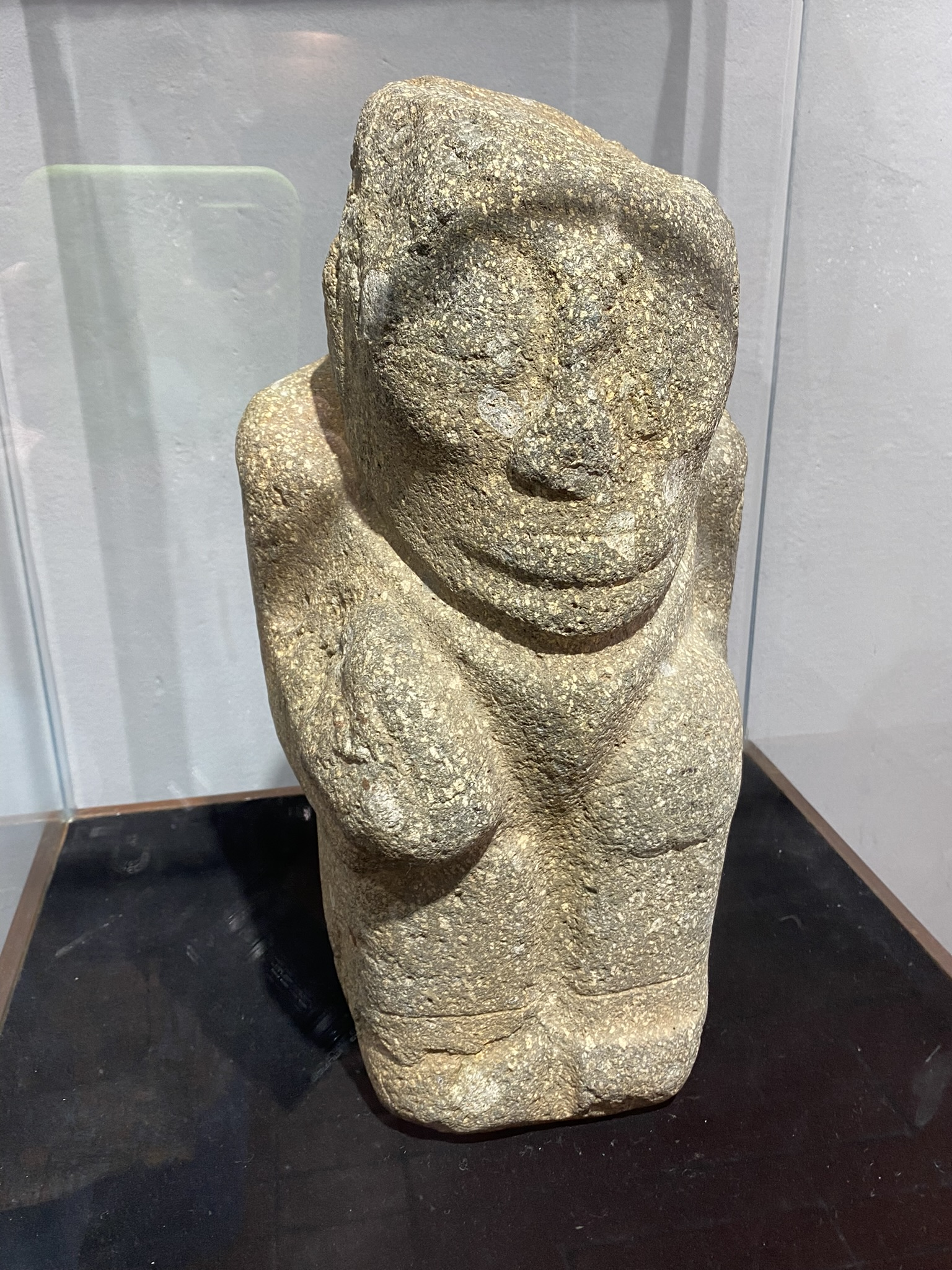
