= Yuraq Apachita =

Yuraq Apachita (Quechua yuraq white, Aymara apachita the place of transit of an important pass in the principal routes of the Andes; name in the Andes for a stone cairn, a little pile of rocks built along the trail in the high mountains, Hispanicized spellings Yurac Apacheta, Yuraj Apacheta, Yuracapacheta) may refer to:

- Yuraq Apachita (Arequipa), a mountain in the Arequipa Province, Arequipa Region, Peru
- Yuraq Apachita (Azángaro), a mountain in the Azángaro Province, Puno Region, Peru
- Yuraq Apachita (La Unión), a mountain in the La Unión Province, PArequipa Region, Peru
- Yuraq Apachita (Lampa), a mountain in the Lampa Province, Puno Region, Peru
