= Fuente Magna =

Out-of-place artifact supposedly found in Bolivia

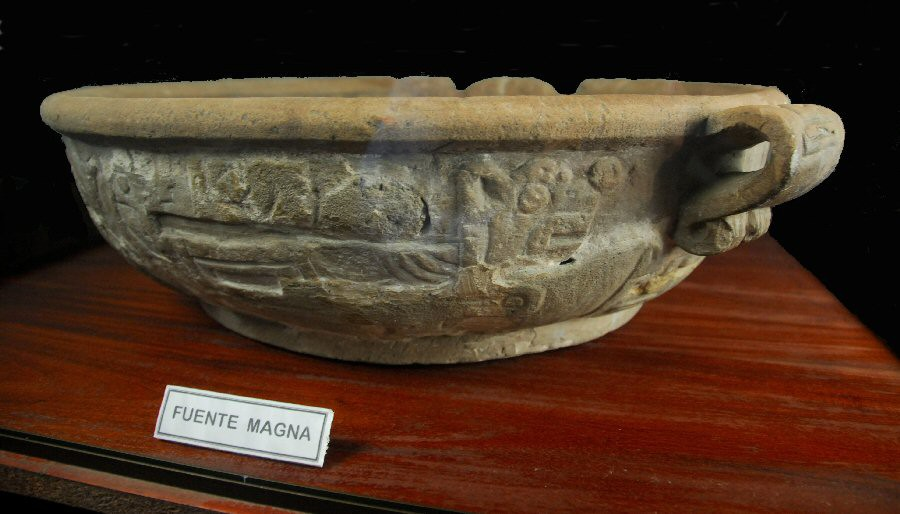
Fuente Magna exhibited in a museum

The Fuente Magna is a large stone vessel that was discovered in Bolivia on the shores of Lake Titicaca by a local farmer. Its cultural affiliation and chronology is uncertain, as is the context where it was found.

== Description ==
It is a large piece, similar to a libation vessel. It was found in 1950 by a farmer near the town of Chua, near Lake Titicaca. It is currently in the Museum of precious metals "Museo de Oro" on Jaén street, in La Paz, Bolivia. Some of its inner engraving superficially resembles non-Sumerian Mesopotamian cuneiform writing. Alexander H. Joffe has suggested that "the inscription is simply geometric filler or deliberate gibberish. And if anything, the face on the interior looks more like something produced by the local Tiwanaku culture (ca. 200-1000 CE)".
