= Pucará District, Lampa =

Coordinates: 15°02′56″S 70°22′43″W

Pucará Pukara
- District
- Interactive map of Pucará
- Country: Peru
- Region: Puno
- Province: Lampa
- Capital: Pucará

Government
  - Mayor: Leonardo Arpi Inofuente

Area
  - Total: 537.6 km^{2} (207.6 sq mi)
- Elevation: 3,860 m (12,660 ft)

Population (2017)
  - Total: 5,306
  - Density: 9.870/km^{2} (25.56/sq mi)
- Time zone: UTC-5 (PET)
- UBIGEO: 210708

Pucará District is one of ten districts of the province Lampa in Peru.

== Geography ==
One of the highest peaks of the district is Qullqi at 4,916 m (16,129 ft). Other mountains are listed below:

- Awkisa
- Ch'uwañuma
- Hatun Yana
- Japuni
- Jayuni
- Kiswarani
- Kuntur Wasi
- Llallawa
- Puka Tika
- Quchapata
- Qullqi Q'awa
- Q'ala Qhata
- Sapan Quta
- Saywa
- Sura Qutaña
- Tampu Tira
- Wiraquchani
- Yana Kunka
- Yuraq Apachita

== Ethnic groups ==
The people in the district are mainly indigenous citizens of Quechua descent. Quechua is the language which the majority of the population (77.40%) learnt to speak in childhood, 22.22% of the residents started speaking using the Spanish language (2007 Peru Census).

== Climate ==
Climate data for Pucará, elevation 3,877 m (12,720 ft), (1991–2020)
Month	Jan	Feb	Mar	Apr	May	Jun	Jul	Aug	Sep	Oct	Nov	Dec	Year
Mean daily maximum °C (°F)	16.5 (61.7)	16.3 (61.3)	16.5 (61.7)	16.8 (62.2)	16.9 (62.4)	16.3 (61.3)	16.3 (61.3)	17.3 (63.1)	18.2 (64.8)	18.4 (65.1)	18.9 (66.0)	17.7 (63.9)	17.2 (62.9)
Mean daily minimum °C (°F)	4.4 (39.9)	4.6 (40.3)	3.6 (38.5)	1.2 (34.2)	−3.6 (25.5)	−6.8 (19.8)	−6.9 (19.6)	−5.2 (22.6)	−1.5 (29.3)	0.9 (33.6)	2.0 (35.6)	3.4 (38.1)	−0.3 (31.4)
Average precipitation mm (inches)	143.2 (5.64)	131.8 (5.19)	114.6 (4.51)	45.2 (1.78)	9.2 (0.36)	4.5 (0.18)	3.8 (0.15)	9.0 (0.35)	17.9 (0.70)	53.2 (2.09)	57.0 (2.24)	112.7 (4.44)	702.1 (27.63)
Source: National Meteorology and Hydrology Service of Peru

== See also ==
- Pucará, Puno
