= Pre-Columbian Bolivia =

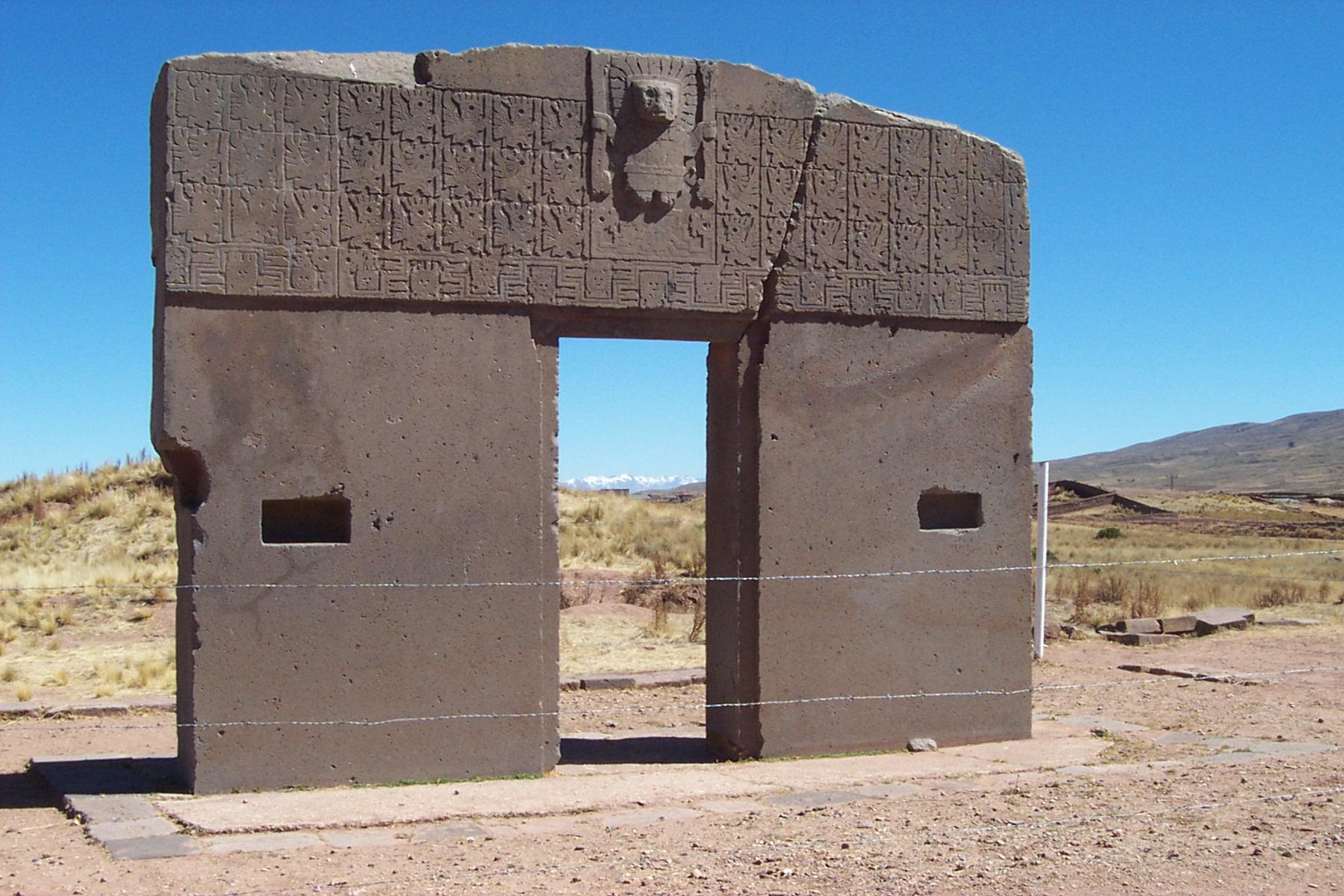
Gate of the Sun in Tiwanaku

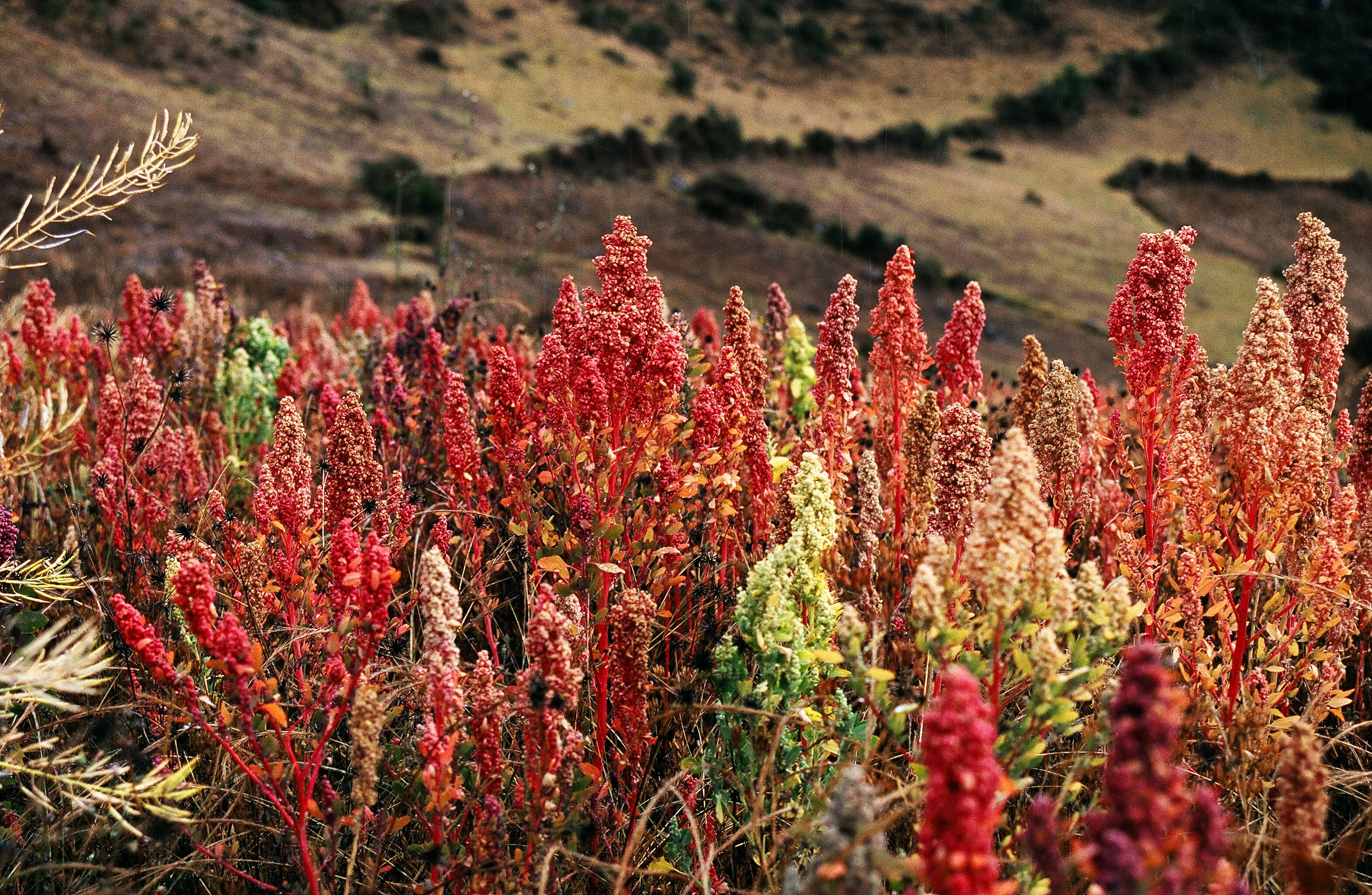
Quinoa plants

Tiwanaku empire at its largest territorial extent, AD 950

Pre-Columbian Bolivia covers the historical period between 10,000 BCE, when the Upper Andes region was first populated and 1532, when Spanish conquistadors invaded Inca Empire. The Andes region of Pre-Columbian South America was dominated by the Tiwanaku civilization until about 1200, when the regional kingdoms of the Aymara emerged as the most powerful of the ethnic groups living in the densely populated region surrounding Lake Titicaca. Power struggles continued until 1450, when the Incas incorporated upper Bolivia into their growing empire. Based in present-day Peru, the Incas instituted agricultural and mining practices that rivaled those put in place many years later by European conquerors. They also established a strong military force, and centralized political power. Despite their best efforts however, the Incas never completely controlled the nomadic tribes of the Bolivian lowlands, nor did they fully assimilate the Aymara kingdoms into their society. These internal divisions doomed the Inca Empire when European conquerors arrived.

== Earliest cultures ==
Various cultures of indigenous peoples in Bolivia developed in the high altitude settings of altiplano, where they coped with low oxygen levels, poor soils and extreme weather patterns. The more temperate and fertile lowlands were sparsely inhabited by hunter-gatherer societies. Much of the pre-Columbian population was concentrated in the altiplano valleys of Cochabamba and Chuquisaca.

The potato was domesticated near lake Titicaca between 8000 and 5000 BC, quinoa some 3000–4000 years ago, and production of copper began in 2000 BC. Llama, alpaca and vicuña were also domesticated and used for transport, food and clothing.

The site of Jisk'a Iru Muqu was first investigated by modern researchers in 1994. A necklace consisting of nine gold beads was found in an excavated grave located next to a Terminal Archaic pit house. Charcoal recovered from the burial dates the gold beads to 2155-1936 cal BC

The earliest known cultures in Bolivia were the Wankarani culture, and the Chiripa culture. The oldest Wankarani sites are dated from 1800 BC onwards. Wankarani culture arose in the area of Oruro Department near Lake Poopo.

=== Pre-Columbian cultures in Bolivia ===
- Wankarani culture
- Chiripa culture
- Tiwanaku empire
- Lupaca
- Mollo culture
- Charca people
- Payaguá people
- Uru people
- Moxo people

== Tiwanaku empire ==
Situated in Western Bolivia, the Tiwanaku empires' capital city also named Tiwanaku has been dated to as early as 1200 BC, where it originated as a small agricultural village. In around 400 AD the Tiwanaku empire began its expansion, appropriating the Yungas and establishing contacts with other cultures in Peru, Bolivia and Chile. By 600 AD it became an important regional power in the southern Andes. Tiwanako then underwent a dramatic transformation between 600 and 700 AD that established new monumental standards in civic architecture for the region and greatly increased the resident population.

The Tiwanaku empire is believed to have absorbed cultures rather than eradicating them. Archaeologists have also seen a dramatic adoption of Tiwanaku ceramics amongst the cultures who became part of the empire. Tiwanaku strengthened its power over its domain through the trade implemented between all of the cities within the empire. The elites thereby gained status by collecting surplus food stocks from all the regions under their influence, and then redistributing it back to the people where needed. This made maintaining large llama herds essential, for carrying goods back and forth between the center of the empire and the periphery.

In about 950 AD a dramatic shift in the regions' climate occurred. A significant drop in annual precipitation in the Titicaca Basin followed as a result, and many cities further away from Lake Titicaca with less access to water sources began to produce less crops, and diminishing surplus food stock to provide to the elites as a result. The immediate area surrounding the capital city and the lake eventually became the last source of substantial agricultural food production for the empire, due to the resiliency of the raised fields to efficiently produce food crops, but in the end even the intelligent design of the fields was no match for the changing climate. The Tiwanaku empire is believed to have dissolved around year 1000 AD when substantial food production ceased, and with it, the main source of power for the ruling elites dried up. The land was not inhabited again for many years after that.

== Aymara kingdoms ==
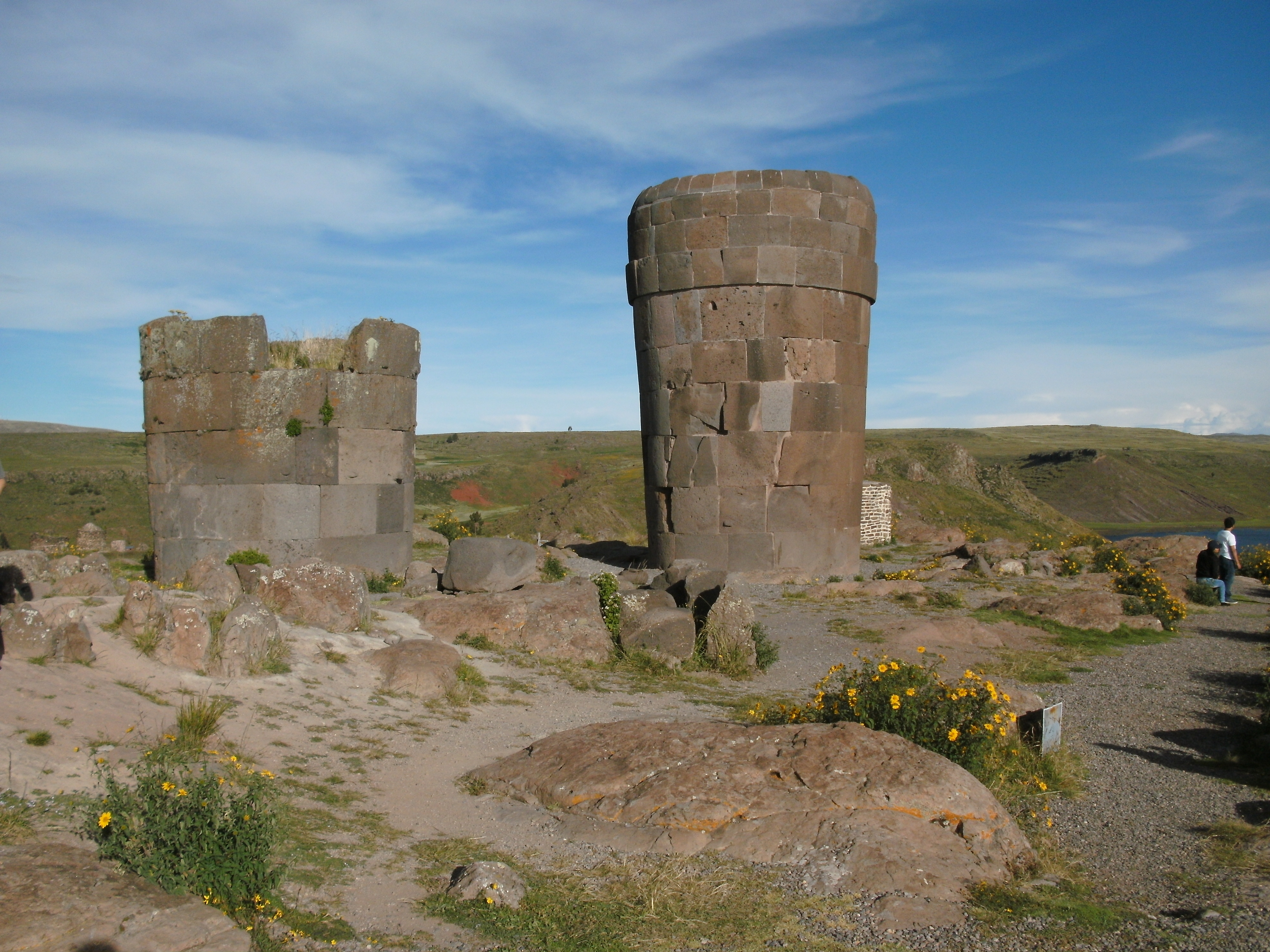
Chullpas

Between 1100 and 1460 AD the Aymaras developed a number of kingdoms in the region surrounding lake Titicaca, of which the Lupaca, Colla and Cana kingdoms were the largest. These were located farther inland in fortified towns (pucara), and chullpa burial and ceremonial towers still remain. Although the Aymaras were based, and prospered in, the harsh altiplano conditions they also controlled lands on eastern slopes of the Andes that were more suited for food production – colonies were also established in lowland temperate and semitropical areas in order to grow adequate food stocks to sustain their populations. This type of society organization has been called the vertical archipelago.

Aymara society was organized by ayllus, or kinship groups. An Ayllu was divided into two strata – upper (hanansaya) and lower (urinsaya). The Aymaras also controlled and dominated the Uru and Puquina people, who had lived in the Andean region before the Aymaras, and by the 12th century they were reduced to the status of oppressed, landless workers subservient to the Aymaras. Aymara dominance in the region was however eventually challenged by the growing state of the Quechuas from Cuzco, who finally conquered them between 1460 and 1500 AD.

== Inca Empire ==
Flag of Qullasuyu

The Incas conquered much of what is now western Bolivia under their ninth emperor Pachacuti Inca Yupanqui, whose reign lasted from 1438 to 1471 AD. Pachacuti Yupanqui was then succeeded by his son Topa Inca Yupanqui whose reign lasted from 1471 to 1493 AD. Western Bolivia became one of the four Incan territories within its empire known as Qullasuyu, with an estimated one million inhabitants.

The highest official of Qullasuyu ruled on behalf of the "Inca" (the emperor) and supervised a group of provincial governors, who in turn controlled the members of the Aymara nobility. Under a draft system called the Mit'a, the Incas forced the peoples under their domination to work in mines, on construction projects, or to serve in the armies. Surprisingly these draftees were compensated fully for their labor.

Despite their policy of extreme centralization, the Incas did not fundamentally change the organization of the Aymara kingdoms, and these kingdoms remained relatively autonomous. Many local chiefs kept much of their power, and in general their rule was supported by Incan authority. The Aymara under these conditions were able to retain their culture, local religious practices, and their language. The regional nobility, although forced to send their children to Cuzco for education, also continued to hold private property. Moreover, the Aymara practice of developing new colonies in the eastern valleys and along the coast was tolerated under Incan rule.

In 1470 AD several Aymara kingdoms began to rebelling against the Incas. The Incas however completely defeated two Aymara states and pacified the region overall by sending mitimas, Quechua-speaking colonists, to Aymara territories particularly to the southern valleys and to the more central valley regions where Cochabamba and Sucre were later founded. By the beginning of the 16th century the Incas had fully reestablished their rule.

Despite their renewed dominance, the Incas failed however to conquer the nomadic tribes in the eastern Bolivian lowlands. The remains of Incan fortresses here reveal evidence of this failure and suggest that Incas could subdue only those cultures based on agricultural activities. As a result of their resistance, the nomadic tribes in the eastern lowlands occupying two-thirds of Bolivia preserved their way of life to a great extent, even after the Spanish conquest. The independence and success of the Moxo people for instance was shown by their construction of elevated causeways to manage the regular floods in the region and to serve their population.

== See also ==
- Indigenous peoples in Bolivia
- Andean civilizations
- Huayra furnace
