= Qullqi (Puno) =

Mountain in Peru

- Location within Peru

Highest point
- Elevation: 4,916.1 m (16,129 ft)
- Coordinates: 15°8′20″S 70°29′52″W

Geography
- Location: Peru, Puno Region, Lampa Province
- Parent range: Andes

Qullqi (Aymara and Quechua for silver, money, Hispanicized spelling Colque) is a mountain in the Andes in southern Peru, about 4,916.1 metres (16,129 ft) high. It is situated in the Puno Region, Lampa Province, Pucará District.
