= Pucará, Puno =

Archaeological site in Peru

Pukara
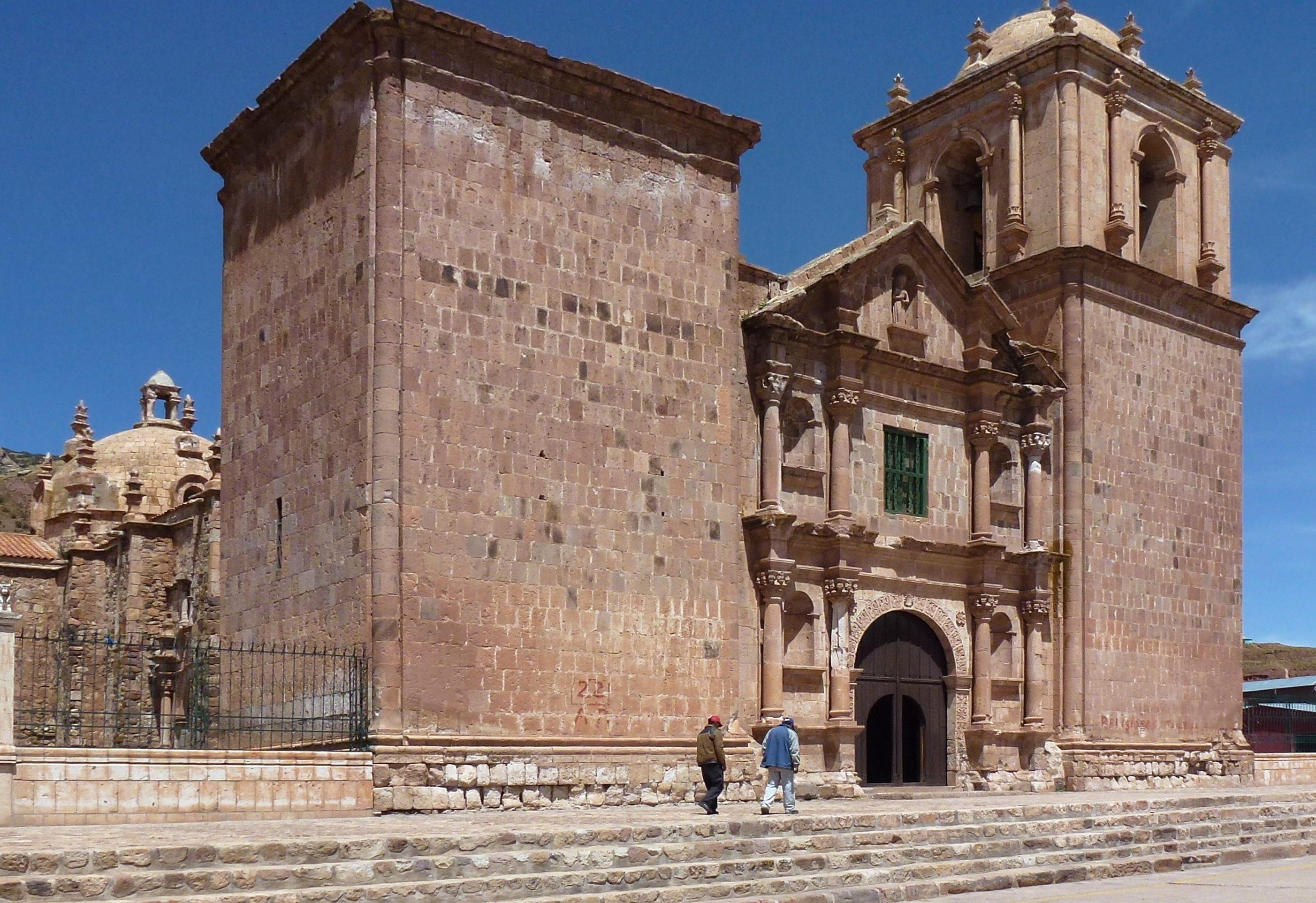
- Iglesia de Santa Isabel de Pucará, Perú
- Interactive map of Pukara
- 15°02′43″S 70°22′22″W
- Location: Peru, Puno Region
- Region: Andes

Pucará, Puno (Aymara and Quechua: Pukara, which means fortress; Hispanicized spellings Pucará, Pucara, also Pukará) is a town in the Puno Region, Lampa Province, Pucará District, Peru. It is located to the north-west of Lake Titicaca.

The ancient archaeological site of Pucará, dated as early as 1,800 BC, is located to the west of the town. The site is very large, spread in the area of approximately 4.2 km2. This was the first large urban center in the region. The site also gave its name to what some archaeologists refer to as a distinct Pukara culture. The site was declared a National Cultural Heritage (Patrimonio Cultural) of Peru by the National Institute of Culture.

== Ancient cultural center ==
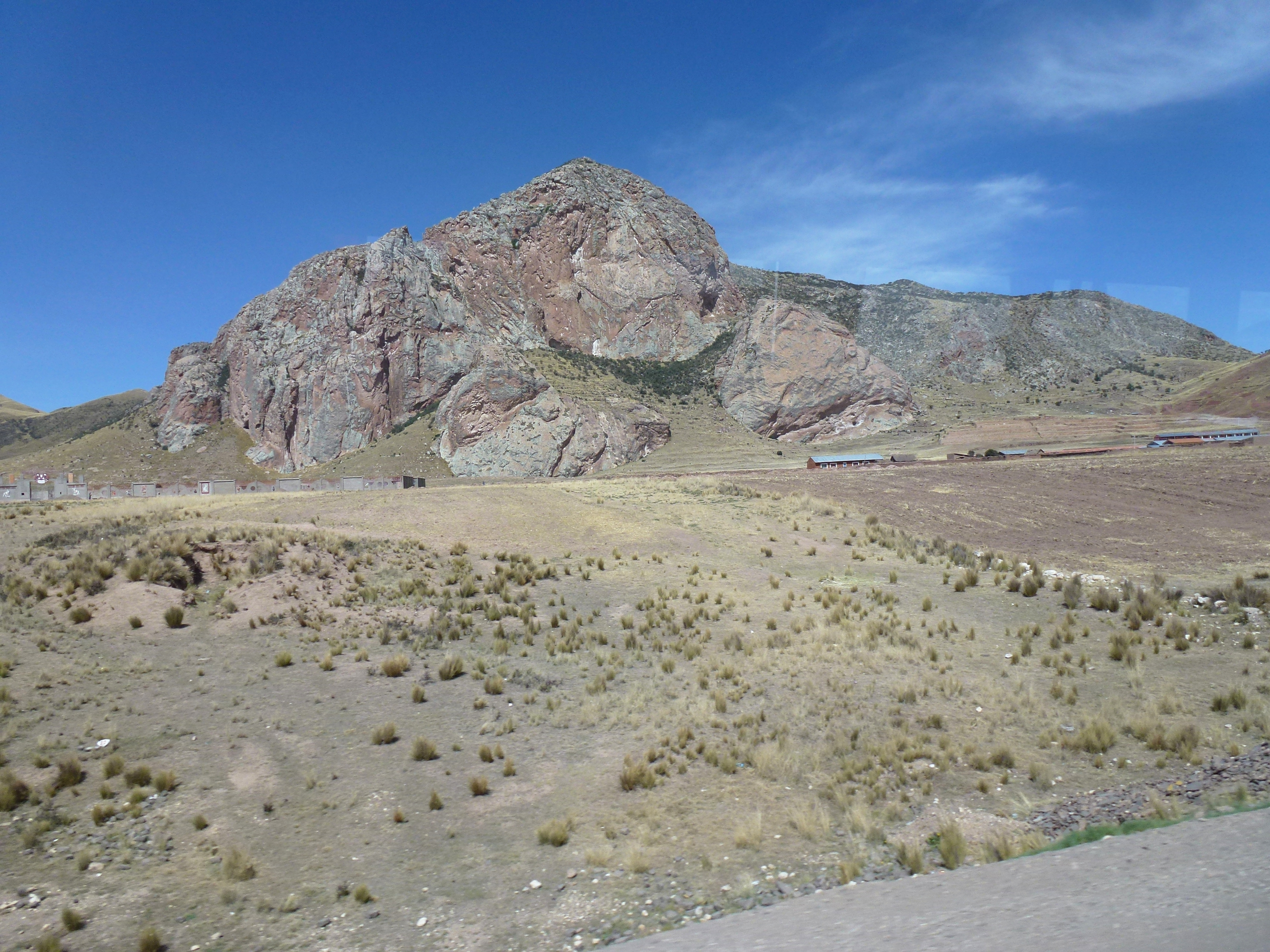
The mountain overlooking the Pukara archaeological site

This was an important highland administrative and religious center. There was a ceremonial sector and the urban sector or city. The ceremonial sector is composed of 9 pyramids of various shapes and sizes, the most important being the pyramid Kalasaya. This structure is built of large monoliths of finely crafted stone, and includes some sculptures. In front of the pyramid, there is a staircase to the upper temple decorated with stelae. There are also figures of mythological beings of men and animals, such as frogs, snakes, fish, and pumas.

There was also a large sunken central court containing carved stone steles.

== Pukara culture ==
This was an influential culture north of Lake Titicaca, centred at Pukara. This culture incorporated earlier communities of the Chiripa period, and ultimately dominated the entire lake region by 200 BC.

The Pukara engaged in agriculture, herding and fishing. The population lived in small towns and villages, which was ruled from central location.

Pukara ceramics are painted in various colours. They are finely made, and include many non-utilitarian forms, such as human and animal motifs.

Pukara pottery and textiles are found widely in the middle Andean, and the coastal Pacific valleys, reaching out into Peru and Chile.

The rise of Tiwanaku may have contributed to the weakening of Pukara around 200 AD.

=== Qaluyu ===
The site of Qaluyu is 4 km from Pukara, and is the type-site of the Qaluyu culture that preceded the Pukara. Qaluyu is a moderate-sized mound (about 7 ha), and it was discovered by Manuel Chávez Ballón, and was test-excavated in 1955 by Alfred Kidder and Ballón.

Qaluyu culture was the dominant early culture of the north Titicaca Basin, and it is dated traditionally to 1400–500 BC. There are Qaluyu occupations under the main temples at Pucara.

There are also several Qaluyu period settlements around the towns of Arapa and Taraco, and also in the Huancane-Putina river valley that have been discovered recently. Some of them are about 20ha in size, much bigger than Qaluyu. These areas are located about 40–60 km to the west of Pukara.

Near the town of Taraco, recent research uncovered a long Qaluyu and Pucara archaeological sequence. There are also a great number of Qaluyu and Pucara stelae.

== Climate ==
Climate data for Pucará, elevation 3,877 m (12,720 ft), (1991–2020)
Month	Jan	Feb	Mar	Apr	May	Jun	Jul	Aug	Sep	Oct	Nov	Dec	Year
Mean daily maximum °C (°F)	16.5 (61.7)	16.3 (61.3)	16.5 (61.7)	16.8 (62.2)	16.9 (62.4)	16.3 (61.3)	16.3 (61.3)	17.3 (63.1)	18.2 (64.8)	18.4 (65.1)	18.9 (66.0)	17.7 (63.9)	17.2 (62.9)
Mean daily minimum °C (°F)	4.4 (39.9)	4.6 (40.3)	3.6 (38.5)	1.2 (34.2)	−3.6 (25.5)	−6.8 (19.8)	−6.9 (19.6)	−5.2 (22.6)	−1.5 (29.3)	0.9 (33.6)	2.0 (35.6)	3.4 (38.1)	−0.3 (31.4)
Average precipitation mm (inches)	143.2 (5.64)	131.8 (5.19)	114.6 (4.51)	45.2 (1.78)	9.2 (0.36)	4.5 (0.18)	3.8 (0.15)	9.0 (0.35)	17.9 (0.70)	53.2 (2.09)	57.0 (2.24)	112.7 (4.44)	702.1 (27.63)
Source: National Meteorology and Hydrology Service of Peru

== See also ==
- Wankarani culture
