= Chuquiña =

Coordinates: 17°47′S 67°27′W

- Town
- Interactive map of Chuquiña
- Country: Bolivia
- Time zone: UTC-4 (BOT)

Chuquiña is a small town in Bolivia. In 2009 it had an estimated population of 1048.

== Climate ==
Climate data for Chuquiña, elevation 3,735 m (12,254 ft)
Month	Jan	Feb	Mar	Apr	May	Jun	Jul	Aug	Sep	Oct	Nov	Dec	Year
Mean daily maximum °C (°F)	18.9 (66.0)	18.8 (65.8)	19.2 (66.6)	19.4 (66.9)	18.4 (65.1)	17.4 (63.3)	17.5 (63.5)	18.5 (65.3)	19.2 (66.6)	20.5 (68.9)	21.0 (69.8)	20.2 (68.4)	19.1 (66.4)
Daily mean °C (°F)	12.0 (53.6)	11.9 (53.4)	11.8 (53.2)	10.9 (51.6)	8.5 (47.3)	6.1 (43.0)	6.8 (44.2)	9.0 (48.2)	10.5 (50.9)	11.8 (53.2)	12.3 (54.1)	12.4 (54.3)	10.3 (50.6)
Mean daily minimum °C (°F)	5.0 (41.0)	5.0 (41.0)	4.6 (40.3)	2.5 (36.5)	−1.5 (29.3)	−5.2 (22.6)	−3.9 (25.0)	−0.5 (31.1)	1.8 (35.2)	3.1 (37.6)	3.7 (38.7)	4.7 (40.5)	1.6 (34.9)
Average precipitation mm (inches)	127.1 (5.00)	105.4 (4.15)	137.3 (5.41)	158.2 (6.23)	154.3 (6.07)	139.4 (5.49)	145.9 (5.74)	162.1 (6.38)	176.2 (6.94)	191.8 (7.55)	189.2 (7.45)	156.8 (6.17)	1,843.7 (72.58)
Average precipitation days	14.6	12.3	9.4	3.0	1.2	0.4	0.8	1.7	3.2	3.1	5.0	9.7	64.4
Average relative humidity (%)	76.6	77.0	73.0	68.6	62.2	57.8	58.7	58.2	59.5	58.9	66.4	70.6	65.6
Source: Servicio Nacional de Meteorología e Hidrología de Bolivia
