= Yuraq Apachita (Lampa) =

Mountain in Peru

- Location within Peru

Highest point
- Elevation: 4,423.9 m (14,514 ft)
- Coordinates: 15°4′4″S 70°27′47″W

Geography
- Location: Peru, Puno Region, Lampa Province
- Parent range: Andes

Yuraq Apachita (Quechua yuraq white, Aymara apachita the place of transit of an important pass in the principal routes of the Andes; name for a stone cairn in the Andes, a little pile of rocks built along the trail in the high mountains, Hispanicized spelling Yuracapacheta) is a mountain in the Andes of Peru, about 4,423.9 metres (14,514 ft) high. It is situated in the Puno Region, Lampa Province, Pucará District, southwest of Pucará.
