= Wankarani culture =

Archaeological culture

Wankarani
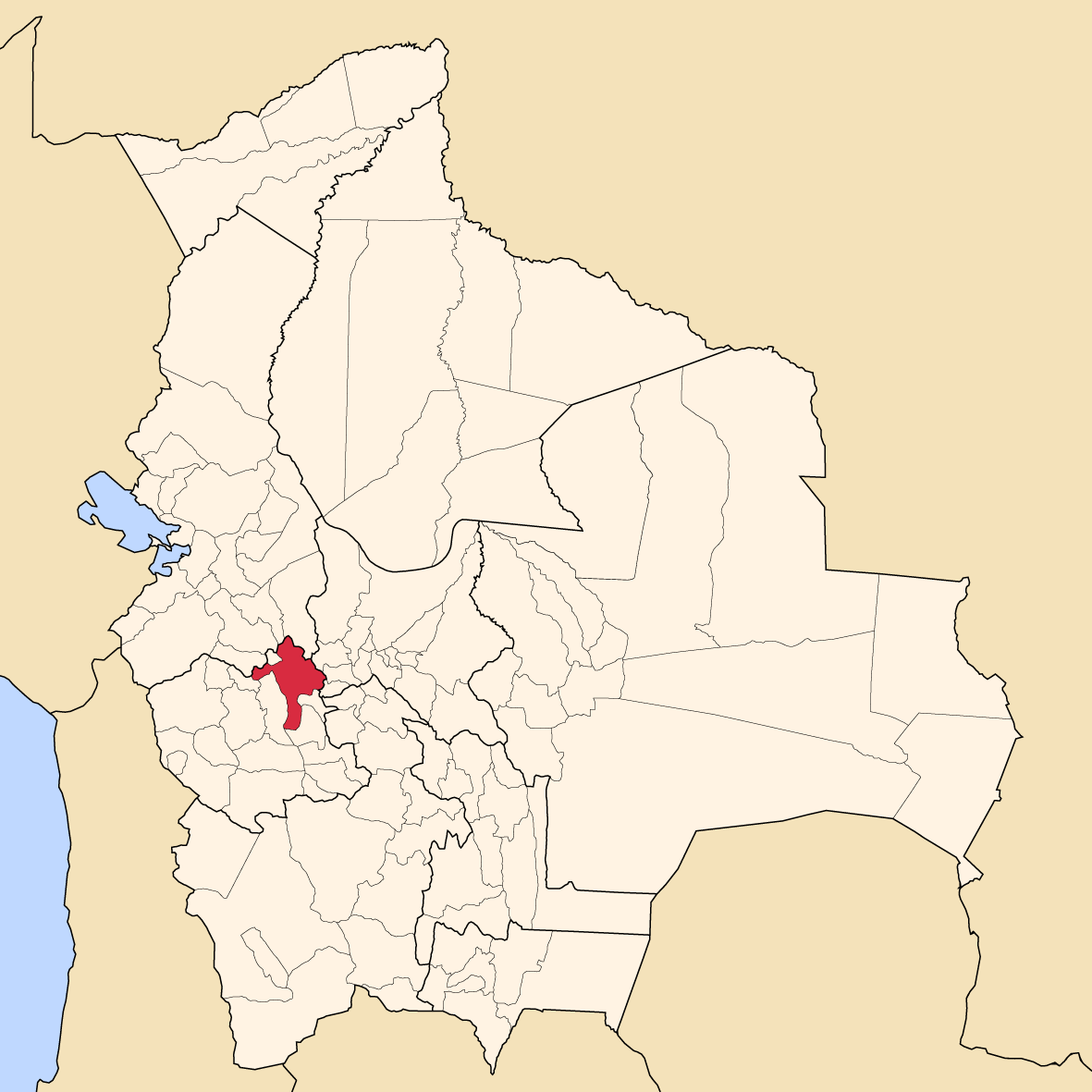
- Cercado Province (Oruro), the approximate location of the Wankarani culture
- Period: Formative stage
- Dates: c. 1300 BCE - 600 CE
- Preceded by: Chinchorro
- Followed by: Tiwanaku

The Wankarani culture was a formative stage culture that existed from approximately 1400 BCE to 600 CE on the altiplano highlands of Bolivia's Oruro Department to the north and northeast of Lake Poopo. It is the earliest known sedentary culture in Bolivia, as after circa 1200 BCE camelid hunters of the altiplano became camelid herders and sedentary lifestyle developed. The Wankarani culture was little researched before 1970, when Carlos Ponce Sanginés defined all the mound sites in the area as belonging to one culture that predated Tiwanaku and was contemporary with the Chiripa culture.

== Description ==
Wankarani villages typically consisted of fifteen to five hundred houses. Over the centuries, remains of the adobe bricks and trash created small mounds, on which new houses were built. The dead were buried under the floor of the huts. Wankarani houses were small, round adobe huts painted red on the outside and yellow on the inside. Some villages had up to 4000 inhabitants, but the majority of villages had less than one hundred people. A site near the Chuquiña village has been considered one of the largest Wankarani villages. Some of the settlement mounds grew to 5 metres (16 ft) in height and indicate that village life changed very little during this time, as Wankarani society did not advance into larger chiefdoms or a small state, yet formed independent village communities. The usual location of villages at the base of the hills, absence of village walls and minimal remains of weapons suggest that it was a peaceful society.

Wankarani economy was based on herding llamas and alpacas, cultivation of potatoes, quinoa and qañiwa. The harsh climate and low rainfall meant that Wankarani economy remained at subsistence levels of natural farming and small regional trade. Copper smelting was known to Wankarani as remains of smelters have been found. Artisans also made small stone heads sculpted after the llamas and alpacas. Wankarani pottery was undecorated, making it hard to understand the visual style of this culture.

Wankarani culture ended as it was incorporated into the growing and expanding Tiwanaku empire.

== Contemporary cultures ==
In northern Chile and neighbouring areas of Peru and Bolivia, early ceramics started to appear during the 'Faldas del Morro' and subsequent 'Alto Ramírez' cultural phases, which are roughly contemporary with Wankarani culture. The Alto Ramírez phase dates to 1000 BCE-400 CE.

The Alto Ramirez phase seems to have been contemporaneous with Pukara and other Lake Titicaca Basin societies of the andean Early Intermediate Period, such as Qaluyu, Chiripa, Pukara, Wankarani and Early Tiwanaku.

== See also ==
- Chiripa culture
- Chinchorro culture
- Pre-Columbian Bolivia
- Prehispanic history of Chile
