= Chiripa culture =

Archaeological culture in Bolivia

Coordinates: 16°28′40″S 68°49′54″W

Chiripa
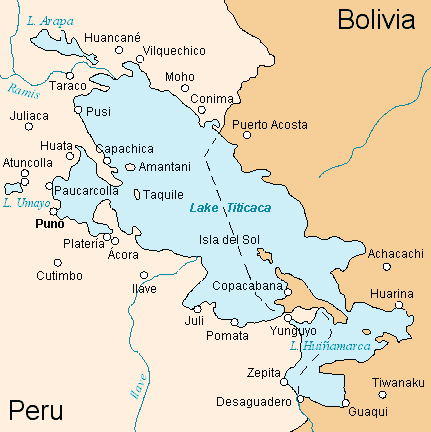
- Map of Lake Titicaca
- Geographical range: Southern shore of Lake Titicaca
- Period: Formative
- Dates: c. 1400 – c. 100 BCE
- Preceded by: Jisk'a Iru Muqu
- Followed by: Tiwanaku

The Chiripa culture existed between the Initial Period/Early Horizon, from 1400 to 100 BCE along the southern shore of Lake Titicaca in Bolivia.

== Architecture ==
The site of Chiripa consists of a large mound platform that dominates the settlement. On the platform is a rectangular sunken plaza (22 m × 23.5 m (72 ft × 77 ft) and 517 m^{2} (5,560 ft^{2})) with a carved stone in the center of the plaza. Rituals occurred in specially prepared public places like the plaza, suggesting the importance of rituals in the creation and maintenance of legitimacy and power.

There are fourteen upper houses with thatched roofs and double walls of cobble and adobe, arranged in a trapezoid surrounding the sunken plaza. These were first identified by Bennet (1936). Each had decorative wall paintings, prepared yellow clay floors and between building wall bins, believed to be for ceremonial storage. Access to the plaza and upper houses was limited to two openings, each on the North and South side of the complex. Access to individual upper houses was a single stone door. Access to wall bins was by single ornate window.

Bennet (1936) excavated burials in the floors of one of the upper houses. Most of the stone-marked burials were children or infants. Adult burials were not usually marked. Gold, copper, shell, and lapis goods were found in many of the stone-marked infant/child graves. While these goods were only found in the one stone-marked adult grave. Adult skeletal remains were often found in bundles in parts of the site above ground. Variability in grave goods and structure of burials may suggest different statuses in society.

== Middle and Late Chiripa ==
During the Early Horizon period, farmers maintained small gardens where quinoa and other plants grew and were harvested for consumption. Around 800 BCE, we find samples composed almost entirely of quinoa at Chiripa's social and political center, the Montículo (a type of mound).

The Taraco Archaeological Project (TAP), directed by Dr. Christine Hastorf, is investigating the Early and Middle Formative occupation at Chiripa, 1500–100 BCE. TAP subdivided this occupation into three phases: Early Chiripa (1500–1000 BCE), Middle Chiripa (1000–800 BCE), and Late Chiripa (800–100 BCE), based on ceramic styles and architecture and agriculture. However, carbon-14 dating has suggested that the Late Chiripa phase ended no later than 250 BCE.

During the Middle Chiripa phase the population grew, and the village of Chiripa increased to 4.25 ha. The TAP excavations encountered no domestic architecture, but found one of the earliest examples of corporate architecture in the Lake Titicaca Basin: a huanca (semi-subterranean plaza/court), dating to 1000 BCE. The structure is trapezoidal and two meters deep with a white yellow clay floor and walls made of stone plastered with yellow clay.

In Late Chiripa, from 800 to 100 BCE, the Chiripa settlement grew to 7.7 ha and the inhabitants constructed new, more elaborate corporate structures. Early in the Late Chiripa phase, the structure "Choquehuanca" was no longer used and another sunken enclosure, "Llusco", was built in the southern portion of the site. Llusco was closed about 600 BCE, and construction of the site's most prominent feature, a 50-x-50-m platform mound called the Montículo, was begun. The Montículo was built in two phases. From 600 to 400 BCE, the Chiripa residents built a series of rectangular "Lower Houses", which were probably constructed around a small platform. The inhabitants closed the Lower House level around 400 BCE and began constructing the "Upper Houses," which were modified and used until around 100 BCE. The final monument included a semi-subterranean court and an open ring of permanent adobe and rock structures. The Montículo served as public ritual space where ancestors were revered and food was served, and possibly stored, for group events.

== Agriculture ==
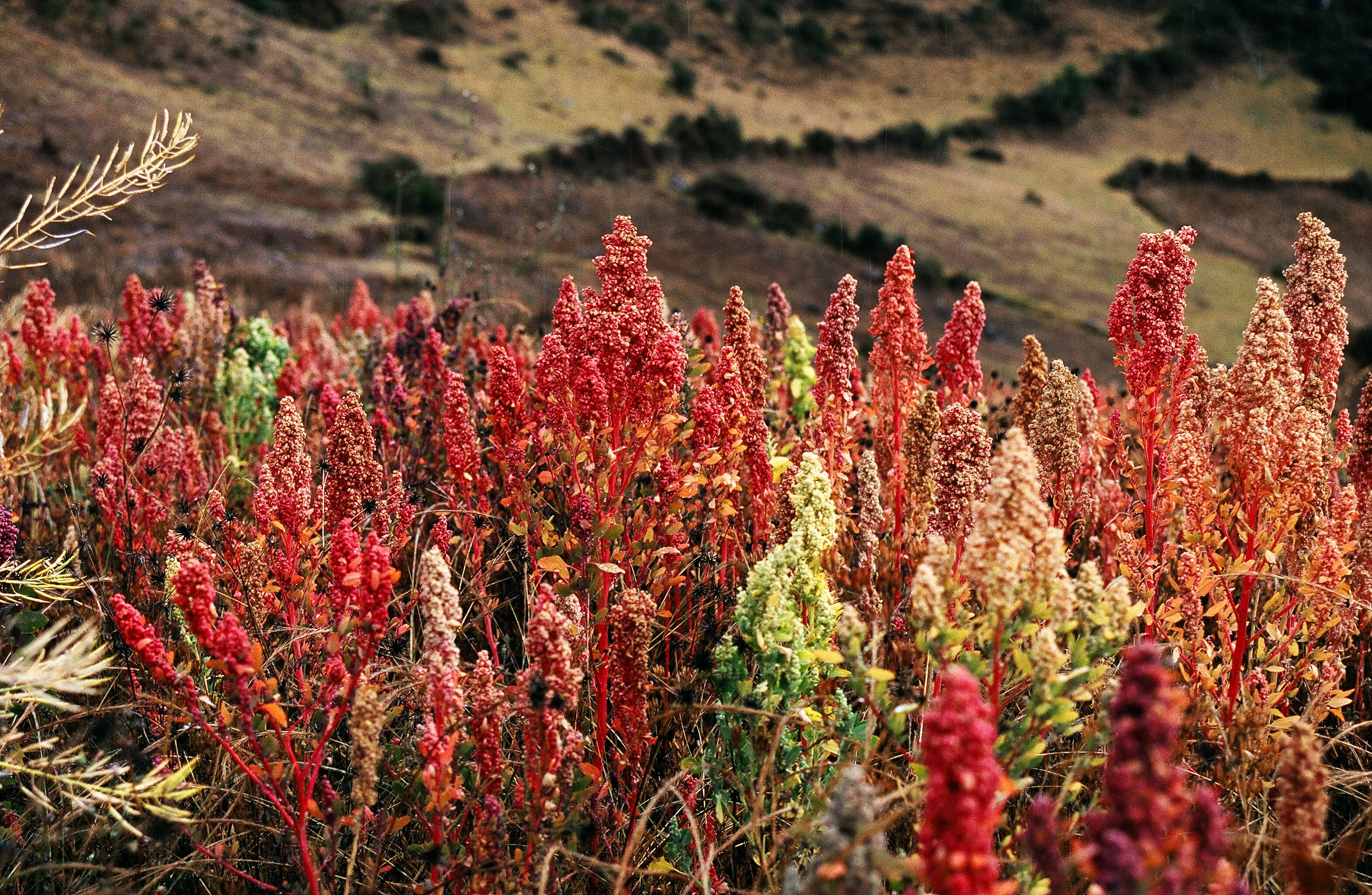
Quinoa

Early and Middle Chiripa agricultural production is characterized by small-scale gardening where both quinoa and quinoa negra were grown and harvested. Quinoa negra is not domesticated and is a form of weed of the domesticated quinoa.

Around 800 BCE, we find a drastic decrease in the frequency of quinoa negra seeds compared to quinoa seeds, signaling changes in crop management and use. In order to reduce the number of quinoa negra seeds in the yearly harvest, farmers may have begun creating formal fields for the crop, weeding, and practicing more careful seed selection. This shift in agricultural production coincides with the development of new ritual and political practices at Chiripa. The presence of large quantities of quinoa seeds at the Montículo suggests that this food played an important role in the activities at this location.

Early potatoes dating to 800–500 BCE were uncovered at Chiripa.

The place was first described by Padre Pedro Marabini in the 20th century. The Taraco Archaeological Project from the University of California, Berkeley began research at Chiripa in 1992. The investigation is led by Christine Hastorf.

== See also ==
- Wankarani culture
- Pre-Columbian Bolivia
