= Tiwanaku polity =

Pre-Columbian polity in Western Bolivia

Tiwanaku polity Tiahuanaco
- c. 600–c. 1000
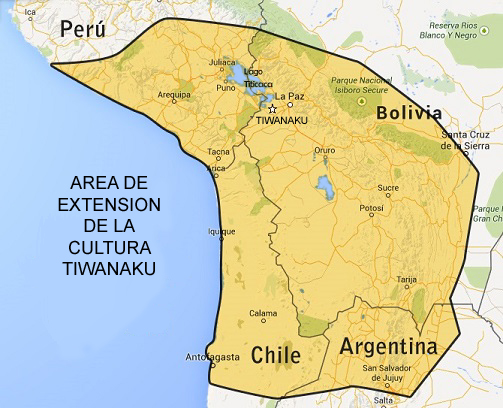
- Map of the Tiwanaku Civilization
- Capital: Tiwanaku, Bolivia
- Common languages: Puquina
- Historical era: Middle Horizon
  - Established: c. 600
  - Disestablished: c. 1000
Preceded by
Chiripa culture
Wankarani culture
Pukara culture
Succeeded by
Wari Empire
- Today part of: Bolivia; Peru; Chile; Argentina

The Tiwanaku polity (Spanish: Tiahuanaco or Tiahuanacu) was a Pre-Columbian polity in western Bolivia based in the southern Lake Titicaca Basin. Tiwanaku was one of the most significant Andean civilizations. Its influence extended into present-day Peru and Chile and lasted from around 600 to 1000. Its capital was the monumental city of Tiwanaku, located at the center of the polity's core area in the southern Lake Titicaca Basin. This area has clear evidence for large-scale agricultural production on raised fields that probably supported the urban population of the capital. Researchers debate whether these fields were administered by a bureaucratic state (top-down) or through a federation of communities with local autonomy (bottom-up; see review of debate in Janusek 2004:57-73). Tiwanaku was once thought to be an expansive military empire, based mostly on comparisons to the later Inca Empire. However, recent research suggests that labelling Tiwanaku as an empire or even a state may be misleading. Tiwanaku is missing a number of features traditionally used to define archaic states and empires: there is no defensive architecture at any Tiwanaku site or changes in weapon technology, there are no princely burials or other evidence of a ruling dynasty, no evidence of state-maintained roads or outposts, and no markets.

Tiwanaku was a multi-cultural network of powerful lineages that brought people together to build large monuments. These work feasts integrated people in powerful ceremonies, and this was probably the central dynamic that attracted people from hundreds of kilometers away, who may have traveled there as part of llama caravans to trade, make offerings, and honor the gods.

Outside of the core area in the southern Lake Titicaca Basin, there were Tiwanaku colonies on the coast of Peru, where highland people imitated Tiwanaku temples and ceramics, and cemeteries in northern Chile with elaborate grave goods in the Tiwanaku style. Despite the clear connections to these enclaves, there is little evidence that Tiwanaku leaders controlled the territory or people in between; that is, its territory was not contiguous. With a few important exceptions, Tiwanaku's influence outside the Lake Titicaca Basin was "soft power" that blossomed into a powerful, widespread, and enduring cultural hegemony.

The city of Tiwanaku lies at an altitude of roughly 3,800 meters (12,500 feet) above sea level, making it the highest state capital of the ancient world.

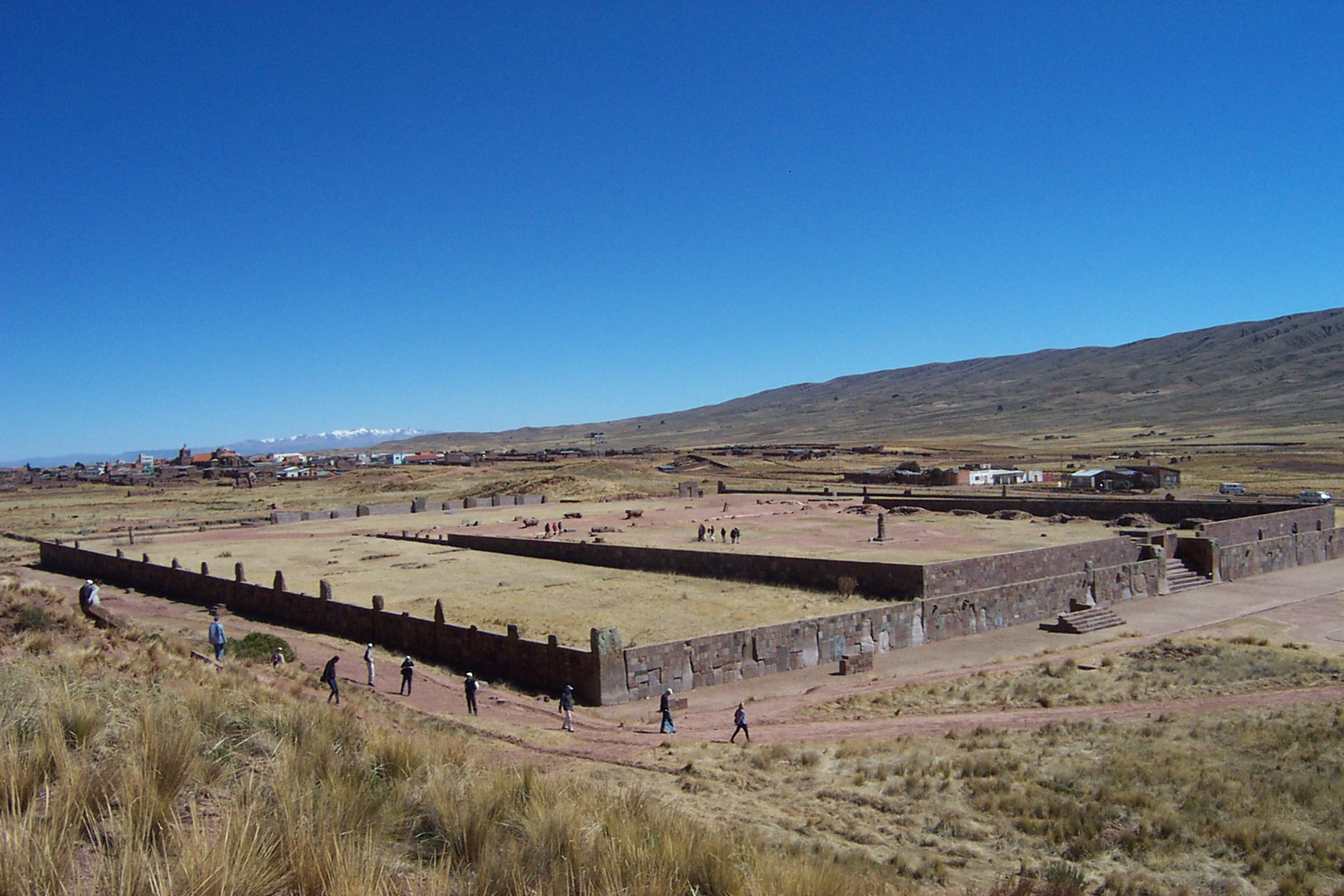
General view of Kalasasaya complex

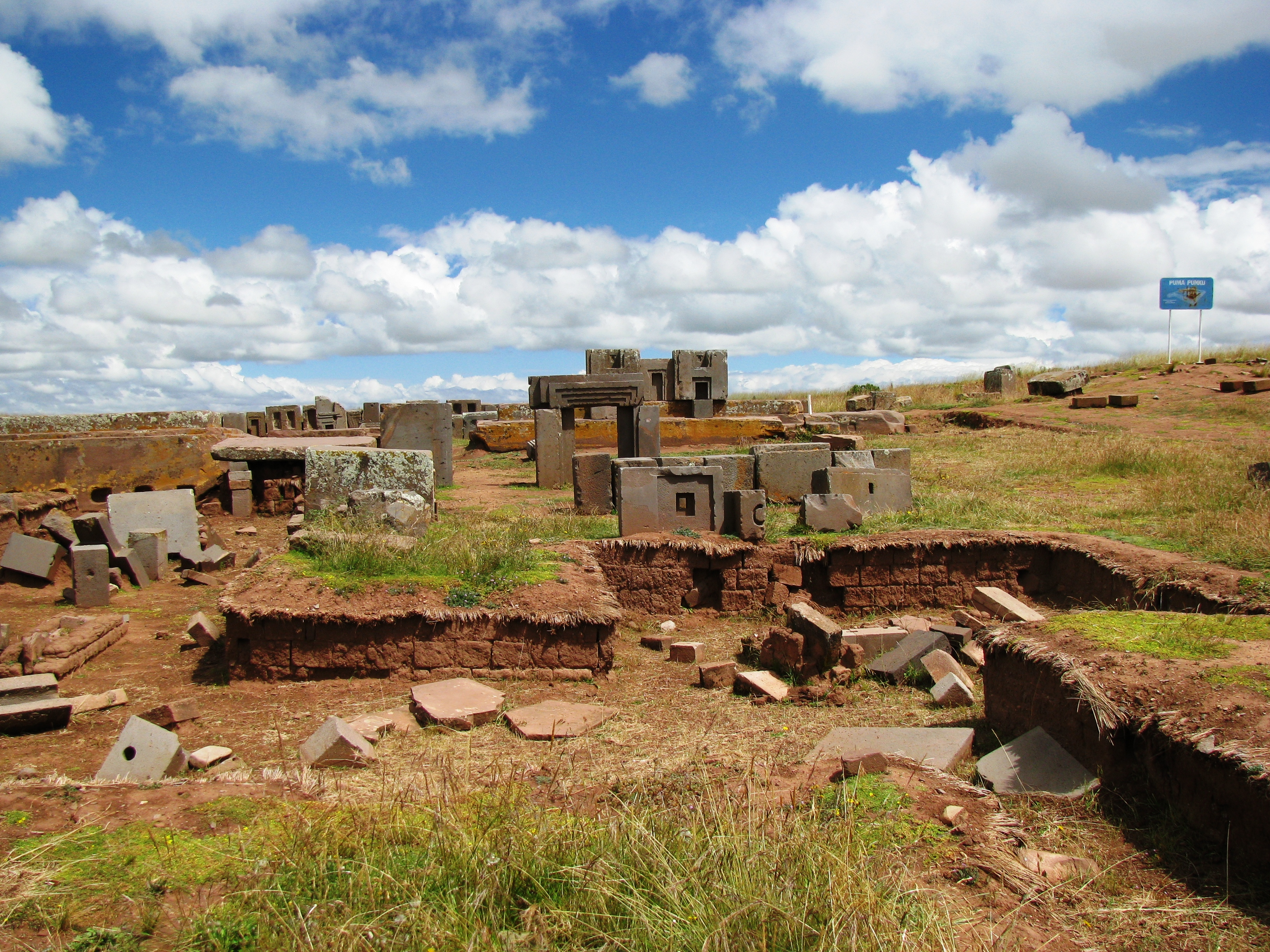
Ruins of Pumapunku complex

== Rise ==
Closeup of a carved stone tenon-head embedded in wall of Tiwanaku's Semi-subterranean (Sunken) Temple

The site of Tiwanaku was founded around 110 during the Late Formative Period, when there were a number of growing settlements in the southern Lake Titicaca Basin. Between 450 and 550, other large settlements were abandoned, leaving Tiwanaku as the pre-eminent center in the region. Beginning around 600 its population grew rapidly, probably due to a massive immigration from the surrounding countryside, and large parts of the city were built or remodeled. New and larger carved monoliths were erected, temples were built, and a standardized polychrome pottery style was produced on a large scale.

Tiwanaku's influence, most clearly documented by the presence of its decorated ceramics, expanded into the Yungas and influenced many other cultures in Peru, Bolivia, and northern Argentina and Chile. Some statues at Tiwanaku were taken from other regions, where the stones were placed in a subordinate position to the Gods of the Tiwanaku. Archaeologists have documented Tiwanaku ceramics at a large number of sites in and beyond the Lake Titicaca Basin, attesting to the expansive influence of Tiwanaku symbols and attached messages of power.

The population grew rapidly between 600 and 800, the site became an important regional power in the southern Andes. William H. Isbell states that "Tiahuanaco underwent a dramatic transformation between 600 and 700 that established new monumental standards for civic architecture and greatly increased the resident population". Early estimates suggested the city covered approximately 6.5 square kilometers at with 15,000 to 30,000 inhabitants. More recent surveys estimate the site's maximum size between 3.8 and 4.2 square kilometers and a population of 10,000 to 20,000. Instead of a large permanent population, the number of people at Tiwanaku probably fluctuated dramatically depending on the season as people made long visits to participate in work parties and festivals.

In the rest of the southern Lake Titicaca Basin, hundreds of smaller settlements have been found. Some of the largest and most important were Lukurmata, Qeya Kuntu, Kirawi, Waka Kala, Sonaji, Kala Uyuni, and Khonkho Wankane.

=== Colonies and diaspora ===
Archaeologists such as Paul Goldstein have shown that the Tiwanaku diaspora expanded outside of the altiplano area and into the Moquegua Valley in Peru. After 750, there is growing Tiwanaku presence at the Chen Chen site and the Omo site complex, where a ceremonial center was built. Excavations at Omo settlements show signs of similar architecture characteristic of Tiwanaku, such as a temple and terraced mound. Evidence of similar types of artificial cranial deformation in burials between the Omo site and the main site of Tiwanaku is also being used for this argument.

Tiwanaku established several colonies as far as 300 km away. One of the better researched is the colony in Moquegua Valley in Peru, which is 150 km from lake Titicaca and flourished between 400 and 1100. This colony was an agricultural and mining center, producing copper and silver. Small colonies were also established in Chile's Azapa Valley.

As the population grew, occupational niches developed, and people began to specialize in certain skills. There was an increase in artisans, who worked in pottery, jewelry and textiles. Like the later Incas, the Tiwanaku had few commercial or market institutions. Instead, the culture relied on elite redistribution. In this view of Tiwanaku as a bureaucratic state, elites controlled the economic output but were expected to provide each commoner with all the resources needed to perform his or her function. Selected occupations include agriculturists, herders, pastoralists, etc. Such separation of occupations was accompanied by hierarchichal stratification. The elites gained their status by control of the surplus of food obtained from all regions, which they then redistributed among all the people. Control of llama herds became very significant to Tiwanaku. The animals were essential for transporting staple and prestige goods.

== Agriculture ==
Tiwanaku's location between the lake and dry highlands provided key resources of fish, wild birds, plants, and herding grounds for camelids, particularly llamas. Tiwanaku's economy was based on exploiting the resources of Lake Titicaca, herding of llamas and alpacas, and organized farming in raised field systems. The Tiwanaku consumed llama meat, potatoes, quinoa, beans, and maize. Because of the variable climate in the high altitude regions, the storability of food became important, prompting the development of technologies for freeze-dried potatoes and sun-dried meat.

Covering approximately 200 km, the Titicaca Basin is the most productive environment in the area, with predictable and abundant rainfall due to the presence of Lake Titicaca. This body of water provides a warmer temperature and more humid environment. To the east, the Altiplano is an area of very dry arid land. The Titicaca Basin also provides a unique landscape with many sources of water ranging from natural springs to large rivers like the Tiwanaku River. The abundance of water resources were crucial to the development of the Tiwanaku since they provided large areas of fertile land that the Tiwanaku culture developed and expanded into farming spaces using large irrigation projects like raised fields, terraces, and qochas.

=== Raised Fields ===
The Tiwanaku culture developed many distinctive farming techniques. Known as "flooded-raised field" agriculture (suka qullu), these fields were used widely in regional agriculture, together with irrigated fields, pasture, terraced fields and artificial ponds. Water from the Katari and Tiwanaku rivers was used to water raised fields, that covered up to 130 km^{2} (50 sq mi). In the Titicaca Basin, these fields were large planting platforms ranging from 5–20 metres (16–66 feet) in width, and 200 metres (660 feet) in length.

Artificially raised planting mounds were separated by shallow canals filled with water. The canals supply moisture for growing crops, but they also absorb heat from solar radiation during the day. This heat is gradually emitted during the bitterly cold nights and provided thermal insulation against the endemic frost in the region. Traces of similar landscape management have been found in the Llanos de Moxos region (Amazonian flood plains of the Moxos). Over time, the canals also were used to farm edible fish. The resulting canal sludge from small aquatic plants was dredged for fertilizer, continuously providing nutrient-rich soil for crops.

Though labor-intensive, this raised-field agriculture produces impressive yields. In an experimental recreation of Tiwanaku agriculture, dry agriculture without irrigation or fertilizer yielded 2.4 metric tons of potatoes per hectare on average, and traditional agriculture with modern artificial fertilizers and pesticides yielded 14.5 metric tons per hectare, the suka qullu agriculture yielded an average of 21 tons per hectare. Modern agricultural researchers have re-introduced the technique of suka qullu. Significantly, the experimental suka qullu fields recreated in the 1980s by University of Chicago's Alan Kolata and Oswaldo Rivera suffered only a 10% decrease in production following a 1988 freeze that killed 70-90% of the plants in the control plots.

While impressive yields are possible in experiments, these fields are vulnerable to potato parasites and if used continuously, are less efficient than traditional rain-fed fields. This led independent researchers like Bandy (2005) to suggest that raised fields were not in fact hyper-productive, noting that local people did not continue using them once experiments and development programs ended in the 1990s. Instead, they were used on a larger scale planting since they could be planted and harvested before other fields. This essentially allowed for two harvests per year: one for hosting feasts and the other for daily consumption. Coordinating this labor schedule was a key activity for leading families at Tiwanaku because they had to attract volunteers to work the raised fields in addition to their own fields.

=== Terraces ===
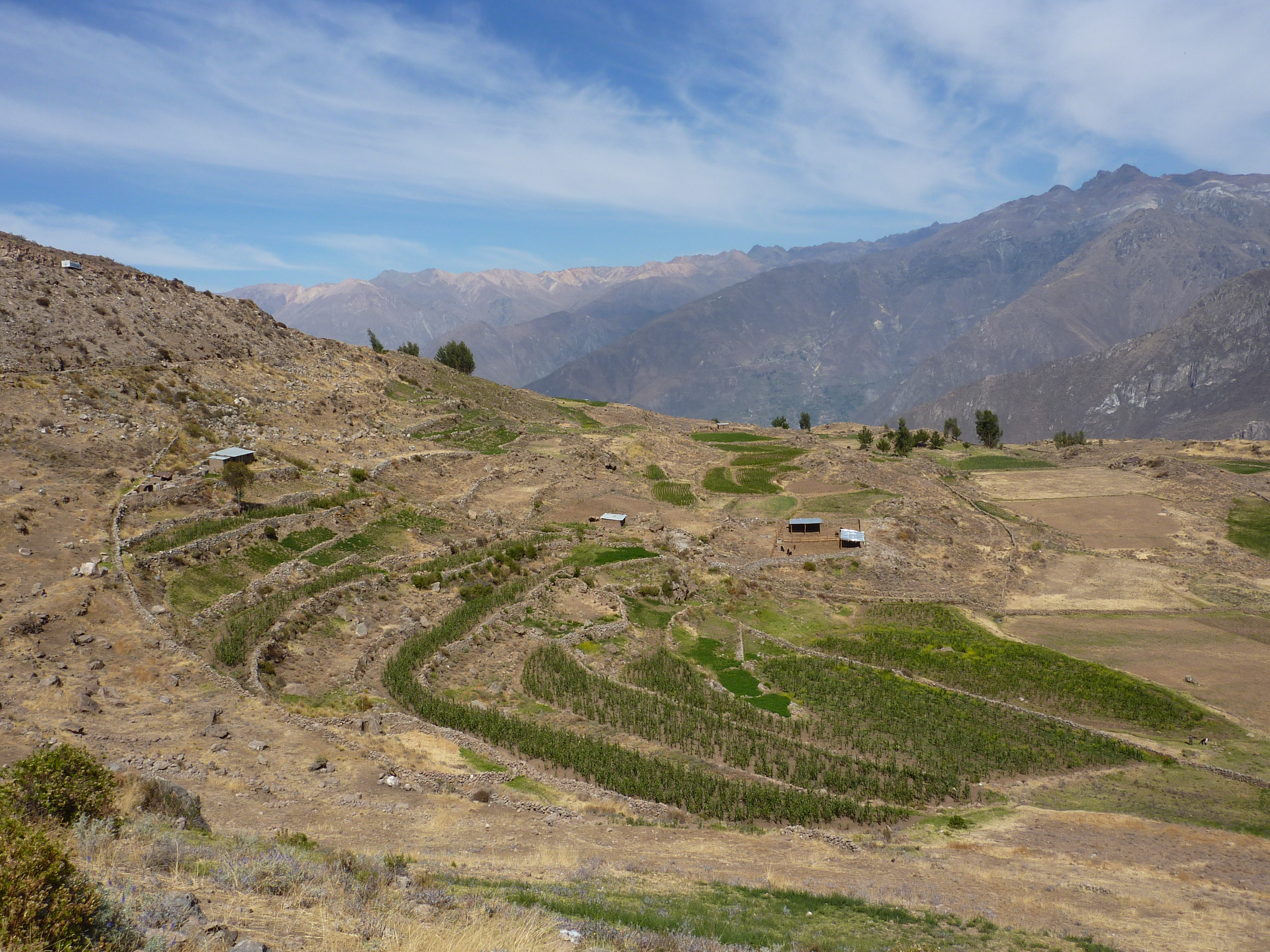
Example of terrace farming in Peru

Another technique used by the Tiwanaku was the usage of terrace structures on hills and mountainsides. These terraces were good at providing water year-round from reservoirs at higher elevations in the mountains. These terraces modified hill slopes into step-like structures that were good at increasing the amount of space for agriculture in a smaller, more limited area, were less vulnerable to frost in higher altitudes, and most importantly, were good at retaining water. Today, these fields have been modified by modern agriculture. The walls of the step-like structure have been removed for plowing and the building of adjusted property lines. This has led to an increase in erosion and a sloping terrain.

=== Qocha ===
One other technique used by the Tiwanaku were the qochas. These are sunken regions of land also known as minibasins connected by a system of canals. These were used as agricultural fields, grazing areas, and water reservoirs and are often still found as clusters in the landscape today. Their sunken nature allowed for the pooling of water to occur. This was especially useful during seasons of drought since these minibasins would retain some of their moisture. Sometimes these features were used for multiple purposes at the same time.

== Collapse ==
Around 1000, Tiwanaku ceramics stopped being produced as the state's largest colony (Moquegua) and the urban core of the capital were abandoned within a few decades. The end date for the Tiwanaku state is sometimes extended to 1150, but this only considers raised fields, not urban occupation or ceramic production. One proposed explanation is that a severe drought rendered the raised-field systems ineffective, food surplus dropped, and with it, elite power, leading to state collapse. However, this narrative has been challenged, in part because of more refined cultural and climate chronologies, which now suggest that the drought did not start until after the collapse.

This lends greater support to alternative theories of collapse that suggest internal social dynamics led to Tiwanaku's demise. Some areas of the capital show signs of intentional destruction, though this could have taken place at any time. Monolithic gates, like Gateway of the Sun, were tipped over and broken. By the end of Tiwanaku V period the Putuni complex was burned and food storage jars smashed. This indicates an event of destruction, followed by abandonment of the site. Colonies in Moquegua and on Isla del Sol were also abandoned around this time.

It has been conjectured that the collapse of the Tiwanaku empire caused a southward migratory wave leading to a series of changes in Mapuche society in Chile. This explains how the Mapuche language obtained many loanwords from Puquina language including antu (sun), calcu (warlock), cuyen (moon), chadi (salt) and ñuque (mother). Tom Dillehay and co-workers suggest that the decline of Tiwanaku would have led to the spread of agricultural techniques into Mapuche lands in south-central Chile. These techniques include the raised fields of Budi Lake and the canalized fields found in Lumaco Valley. Some aspects of Andean religion among Mapuches and Huilliches have also been suggested to be linked to an influence from Tiwanaku.

... dispersing populations in search of new suitable environments might have caused long-distance ripple effects of both migration and technological diffusion across the south-central and south Andes between c. 1100 – c. 1300 ...

— Tom Dillehay and co-workers.

== Religion ==
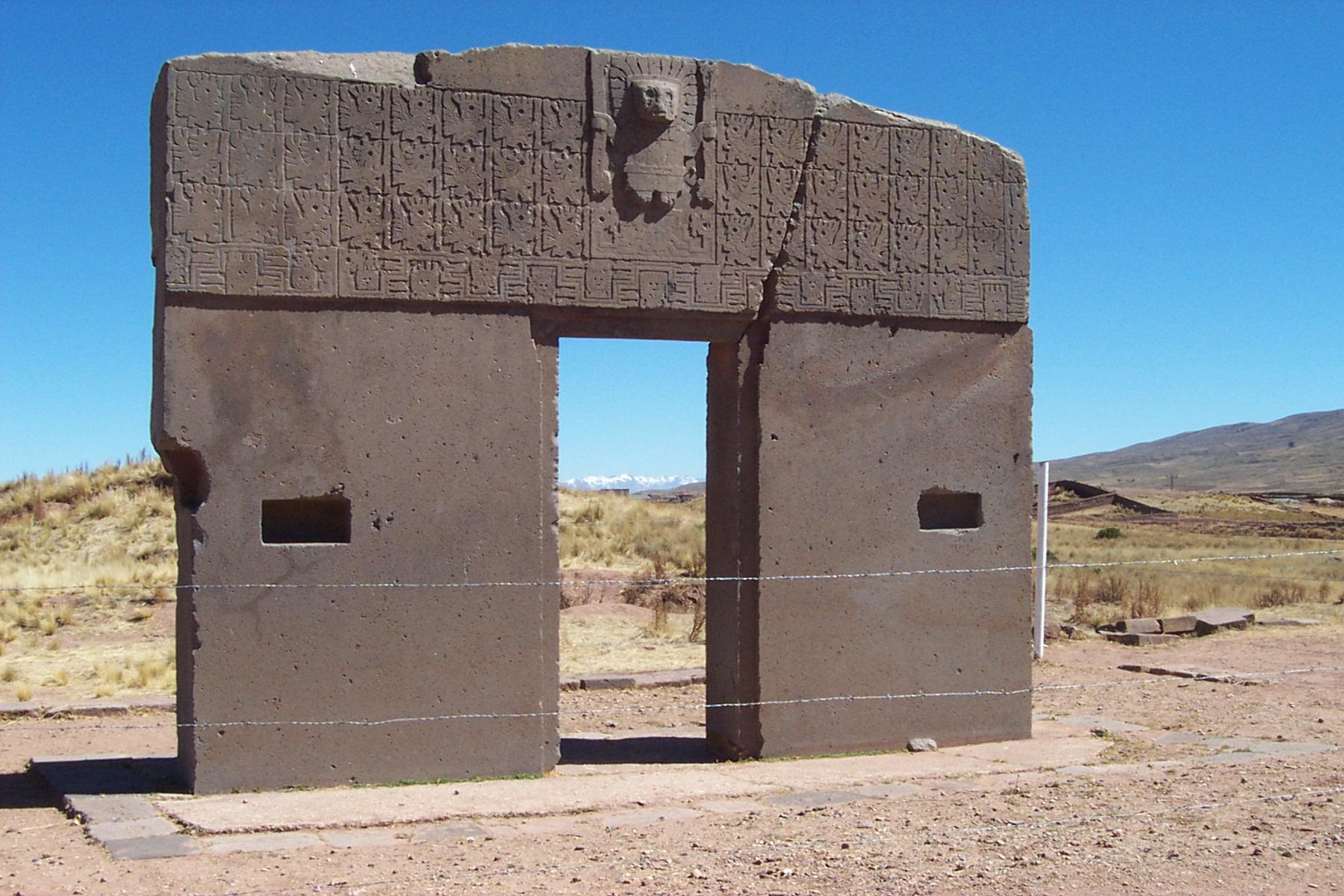
Gateway of the Sun

What is known of Tiwanaku religious beliefs is based on archaeological interpretation and some myths, which may have been passed down to the Incas and the Spanish. They seem to have worshipped many gods.

The Gateway of the Sun is a monolithic structure of regular, non-monumental size. Its dimensions suggest that other regularly sized buildings existed at the site. It was found at Kalasasaya, but due to the similarity of other gateways found at Pumapunku, it is thought to have been originally part of a series of doorways there. It is recognized for its singular, great frieze. This is thought to represent a main deity figure surrounded by either calendar signs or natural forces for agricultural worship. Along with Viracocha, another statue is in the Gateway of the Sun. This statue is believed to be associated with the weather:

a celestial high god that personified various elements of natural forces intimately associated the productive potential of altiplano ecology: the sun, wind, rain, hail – in brief, a personification of atmospherics that most directly affect agricultural production in either a positive or negative manner

It has twelve faces covered by a solar mask, and at the base thirty running or kneeling figures. Some scientists believe that this statue is a representation of the calendar with twelve months and thirty days in each month.

Other evidence points to a system of ancestor worship at Tiwanaku. The preservation, use, and reconfiguration of mummy bundles and skeletal remains, as with the later Inca, may suggest that this is the case. Later cultures within the area made use of large "above ground burial chambers for the social elite... known as "chullpa". Similar, though smaller, structures were found within the site of Tiwanaku.

Kolata suggests that, like the later Inca, the inhabitants of Tiwanaku may have practiced similar rituals and rites in relation to the dead. The Akapana East Building has evidence of ancestor burial. The human remains at Akapana East seem to be less for show and more for proper burial. The skeletons show many cut marks that were most likely made by defleshing or excarnation after death. The remains were then bundled up and buried rather than left out in the open.

The Tiwanaku conducted human sacrifices on top of a building known as the Akapana. People were disemboweled and torn apart shortly after death and laid out for all to see. It is speculated that this ritual was a form of dedication to the gods. The type of human sacrifice included victims being hacked in pieces, dismembered, exposed to the elements and carnivores before being deposited in trash. Research showed that one man who was sacrificed was not a native to the Titicaca Basin, leaving room to think that sacrifices were most likely of people originally from other societies.

== Architecture and art ==
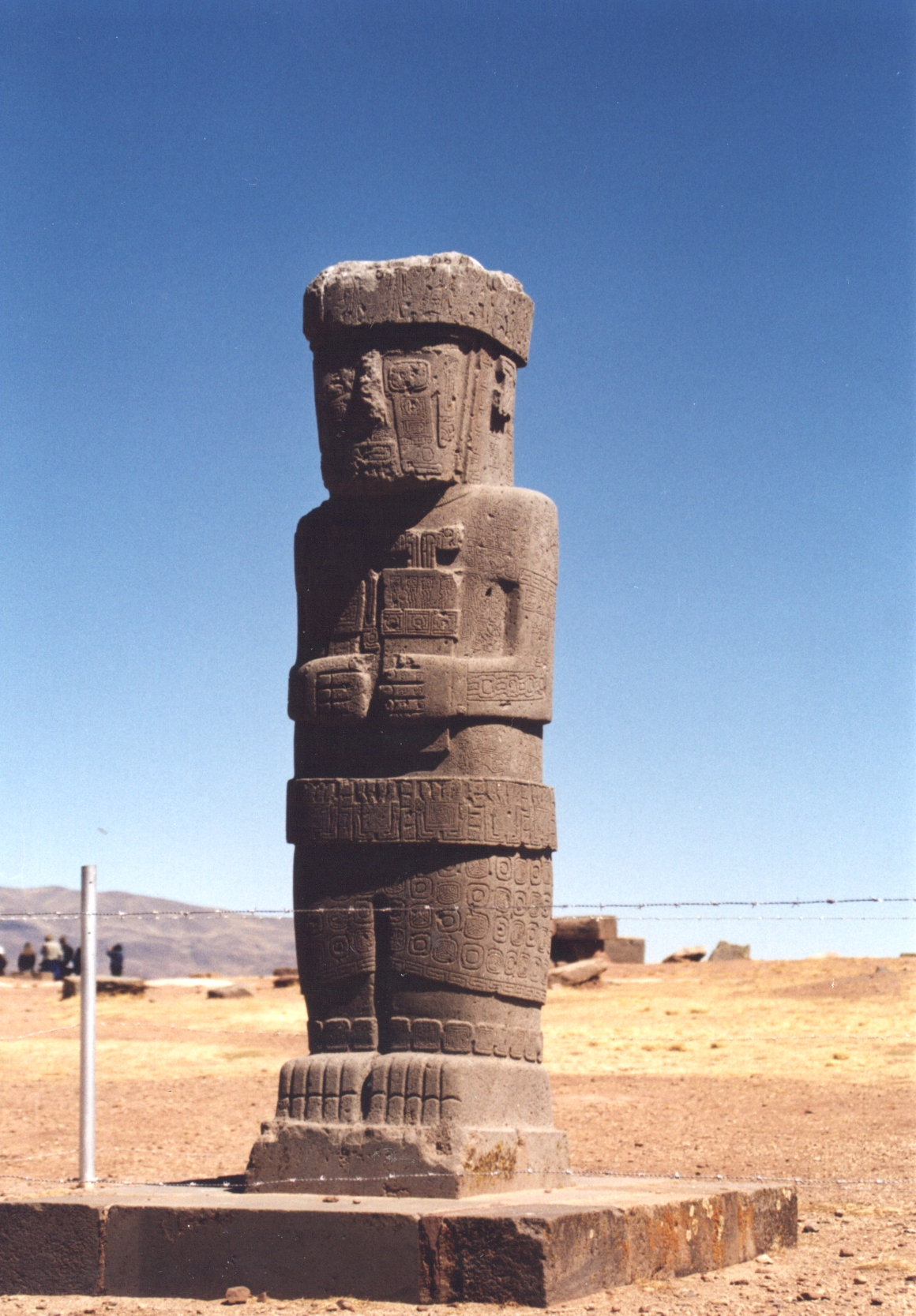
Ponce Monolith in the sunken courtyard of the Tiwanaku's Kalasasaya temple

=== Architecture and sculpture ===
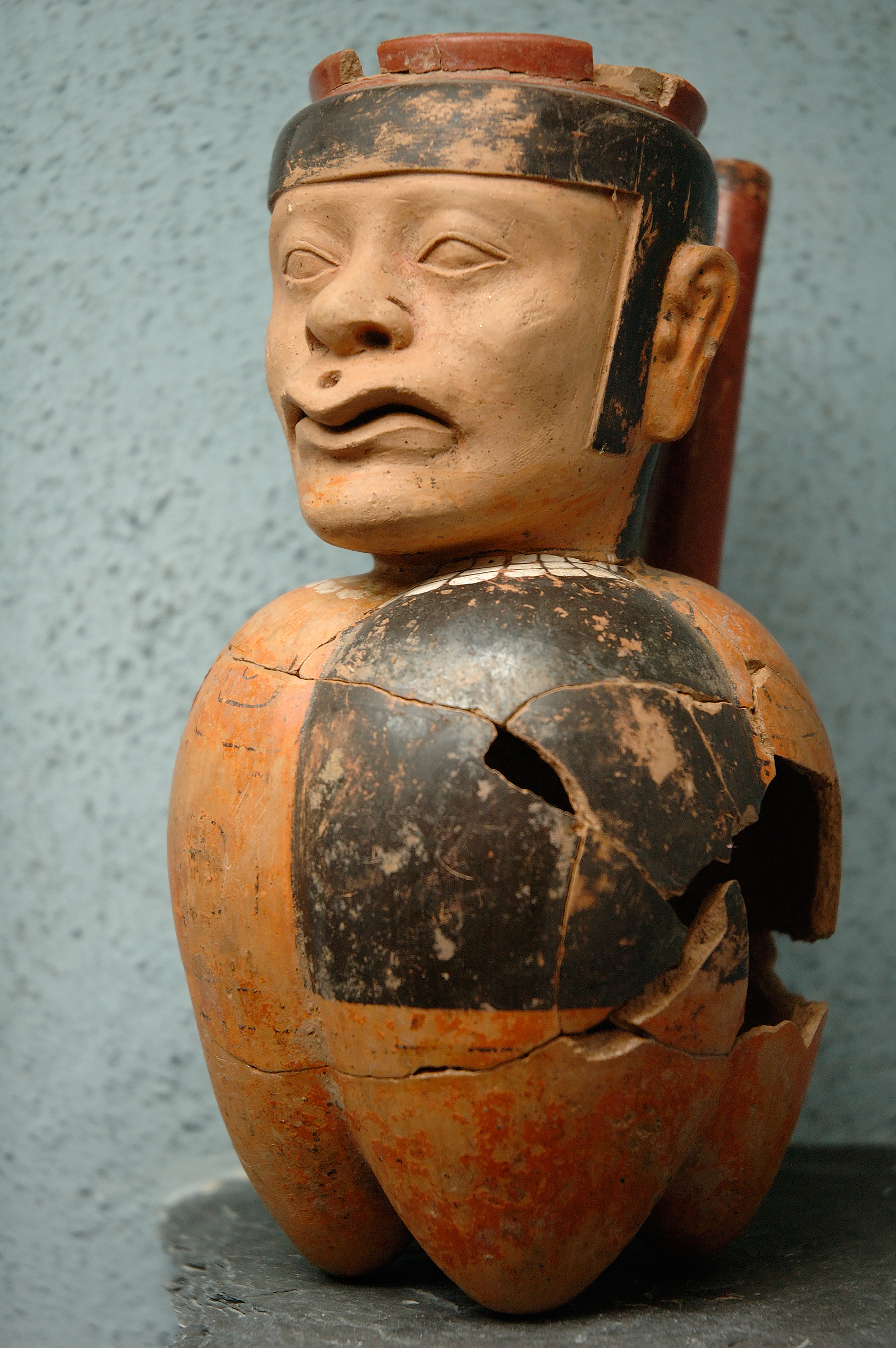
Anthropomorphic vase from the Tiwanaku Site Museum, La Paz, Bolivia

Tiwanaku monumental architecture is characterized by large stones of exceptional workmanship. In contrast to the masonry style of the later Inca, Tiwanaku stone architecture usually employs rectangular ashlar blocks laid in regular courses. Their monumental structures were frequently fitted with elaborate drainage systems. The drainage systems of the Akapana and Pumapunku structures include conduits composed of red sandstone blocks held together by ternary (copper/arsenic/nickel) bronze architectural cramps. The I-shaped architectural cramps of the Akapana were created by cold hammering of ingots. In contrast, the cramps of the Pumapunku were created by pouring molten metal into I-shaped sockets. The blocks have flat faces that do not need to be fitted upon placement because the grooves make it possible for the blocks to be shifted by ropes into place. The main architectural appeal of the site comes from the carved images and designs on some of these blocks, carved doorways, and giant stone monoliths.

The quarries that supplied the stone blocks for Tiwanaku lie at significant distances from this site. The red sandstone used in this site's structures has been determined by petrographic analysis to come from a quarry 10 kilometers (6.2 miles) away – a remarkable distance considering that the largest of these stones weighs 131 metric tons. The green andesite stones that were used to create the most elaborate carvings and monoliths originate from the Copacabana peninsula, located across Lake Titicaca. One theory is that these giant andesite stones, which weigh over 40 tons, were transported some 90 kilometers (56 miles) across Lake Titicaca on reed boats, then laboriously dragged another 10 kilometers (6.2 miles) to the city.

Tiwanaku sculpture is comprised typically of blocky, column-like figures with huge, flat square eyes, and detailed with shallow relief carving. They are often holding ritual objects, such as the Ponce Monolith or the Bennett Monolith. Some have been found holding severed heads, such as the figure on the Akapana, who possibly represents a puma-shaman. These images suggest the culture practiced ritual human beheading. As additional evidence, headless skeletons have been found under the Akapana.

=== Other arts ===
The people of Tiwanaku also made ceramics and textiles, composed of bright colors and stepped patterns. Common textile forms included tapestries and tunics. An important ceramic artifact is the qiru a drinking cup that was ritually smashed after ceremonies and placed with other goods in burials. Over time, the style of ceramics changed. The earliest ceramics were "coarsely polished, deeply incised brownware and a burnished polychrome incised ware". Later the Qeya style became popular during the Tiwanaku III phase, "Typified by vessels of a soft, light brown ceramic paste". These ceramics included libation bowls and bulbous-bottom vases. The Staff God was a common motif in Tiwanaku art.

The effigy objects typically depicted herders, trophy heads, sacrificial victims, and felines, such as puma and jaguars. Such small, portable objects of ritual religious meaning were a key to spreading religion and influence from the main site to the satellite centers. They were created in wood, engraved bone, and cloth and included incense burners, carved wooden hallucinogenic snuff tablets, and human portrait vessels. Like those of the Moche, Tiwanaku portraits expressed individual characteristics. One of the best collections of Tiwanaku human effigy vessels was found on Pariti Island, a pilgrimage center in Lake Titicaca. These vessels bear individualistic human likenesses and reveal much information about Tiwanaku clothing and jewellery styles. Radiocarbon dating revealed that they were interred in the ground between 900 and 1050, so they were probably broken as part of a ritual abandonment of the island's temple by local elites and pilgrims during the collapse of Tiwanaku.

Recent research has identified a Tiwanaku iconographic theme known as the “Tiwanaku Camelid Sacrificer”, which depicts a human–camelid hybrid carrying a trophy head or an axe. TCS imagery appears most often on portable prestige objects (including textiles, carved bone tubes, and snuff-related objects), and that many examples come from Tiwanaku hinterland, associated with camelid caravan networks. Researchers, using Andean concepts, say camelids and humans share camay (an essence/power of being), and the TCS represents tucoy (the process of becoming/transforming into a new form).

While Andean copper mining and metallurgy predates by more than a millennium the Tiwanaku polity, many copper objects produced in this polity are alloys that are characterized by having approximately 5% arsenic and 4% nickel.

== Lukurmata ==
Lukurmata, located in the Katari valley was a large settlement with close ties to Tiwanaku. First established nearly two thousand years ago, it grew to be a major ceremonial center. After Tiwanaku collapsed, Lukurmata rapidly declined, becoming once again a big village.

== Relationship with Wari ==
The Tiwanaku shared domination of the Middle Horizon with the Wari culture (based primarily in central and south Peru) although found to have built important sites in the north as well (Cerro Papato ruins). Their culture rose and fell around the same time; it was centered 500 miles north in the southern highlands of Peru. The relationship between the two polities is unknown. Definite interaction between the two is proved by their shared iconography in art. Significant elements of both of these styles (the split eye, trophy heads, and staff-bearing profile figures, for example) seem to have been derived from that of the earlier Pukara culture in the northern Titicaca Basin.

The Tiwanaku created a powerful ideology, using previous Andean icons that were widespread throughout their sphere of influence. They used extensive trade routes and shamanistic art. Tiwanaku art consisted of legible, outlined figures depicted in curvilinear style with a naturalistic manner, while Wari art used the same symbols in a more abstract, rectilinear style with a militaristic style.

== Bibliography ==
- Bermann, Marc; Lukurmata, Princeton University Press, (1994) ISBN 978-0-691-03359-4.
- Bruhns, Karen Olsen; Ancient South America, Cambridge University Press, Cambridge, UK, c. 1994.
- Goldstein, Paul; "Tiwanaku Temples and State Expansion - A Tiwanaku Sunken-Court Temple in Moduegua, Peru", Latin American Antiquity, Vol. 4, No. 1 (March 1993), pp. 22–47, Society for American Archaeology.
- Hoshower, Lisa M.; Jane E. Buikstra, Paul S. Goldstein, and Ann D. Webster, "Artificial Cranial Deformation at the Omo M10 Site - A Tiwanaku Complex from the Moquegua Valley, Peru", Latin American Antiquity, Vol. 6, No. 2 (June 1995), pp. 145–164, Society for American Archaeology.
- Kolata, Alan L.; "The Agricultural Foundations of the Tiwanaku State - A View from the Heartland", American Antiquity, Vol. 51, No. 4 (October 1986), pp. 748–762, Society for American Archaeology.
- Kolata, Alan L. (June 1991), "The Technology and Organization of Agricultural Production in the Tiwanaku State", Latin American Antiquity, 2 (2): 99–125, doi:10.2307/972273, JSTOR 972273, S2CID 3812420.
- Protzen, Jean-Pierre and Stella E. Nair; "On Reconstructing Tiwanaku Architecture", The Journal of the Society of Architectural Historians, Vol. 59, No. 3 (September 2000), pp. 358–371, Society of Architectural Historians.
- Reinhard, Johan; "Chavin and Tiahuanaco: A New Look at Two Andean Ceremonial Centers", National Geographic Research, 1(3), 395–422, 1985.
- ——— (1990), "Tiahuanaco, Sacred Center of the Andes", in McFarren, Peter (ed.), An Insider's Guide to Bolivia, pp. 151–181.
- ——— (1992), "Tiwanaku - Ensayo sobre su cosmovisión" [Tiwanaku - essay on its cosmovision], Revista Pumapunku (in Spanish), 2: 8–66.
- Stone-Miller, Rebecca (2002) [c. 1995], Art of the Andes - from Chavin to Inca, Thames & Hudson.
