= Julia Elena Fortún =

Bolivian historian

Julia Elena Fortún Melgarejo
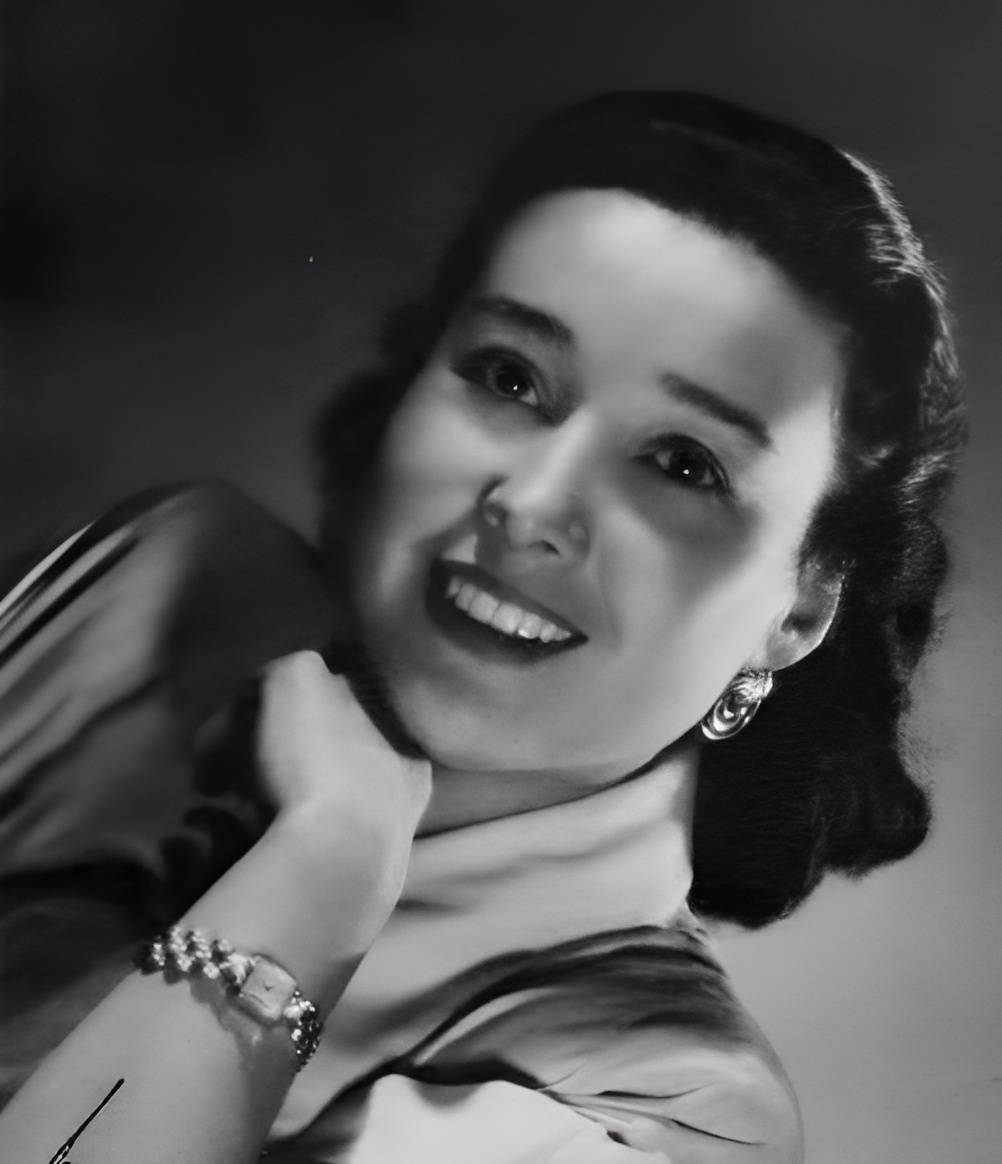
- Born: 9 October 1929; Sucre, Bolivia
- Died: 5 December 2016 (aged 87)
- Education: Universidad Central de Madrid
- Known for: Her investigation about the origins of the Diablada and anthropological studies in Tiwanaku.
- Awards: Premio Nacional de Cultura (1989), Premio al Pensamiento y la Cultura "Antonio José de Sucre" (2007)
- Scientific career
- Fields: History, anthropology, ethnology, ethnomusicology
- Workplaces: Instituto Boliviano de Cultura (IBC)

Julia Elena Fortún Melgarejo (9 October 1929 – 5 December 2016) was a Bolivian historian, anthropologist, folklorist, and ethnomusicologist, who pioneered the study of ethnomusicology in Bolivia. She held an array of government and academic posts throughout her life and was a key figure in Bolivian anthropology.

== Biography ==
Fortún was born in Sucre but lived in La Paz since her childhood. She studied at the Central University of Madrid and at the Institute of Musicology in Buenos Aires. Her 1952 PhD at Madrid included a dissertation on the Christmastime music and dance traditions of Bolivia.

She was married to Carlos Ponce Sanginés, whom she accompanied during the expedition which discovered the Ponce Monolith. The Unión de Mujeres Americanas honored her as the "Woman of the Americas" in 1964. She died on 5 December 2016 at the age of 87.

== Career ==
Fortún was vice president of the Folklore Society of Bolivia in 1950. On 23 January 1954, Fortún became president. Shortly afterwards, she completed two years of postdoctoral coursework in anthropology at the National Autonomous University of Mexico, returning to La Paz in 1956. She was appointed to oversee the Dirección General de Cultura in 1956 and the Dirección Nacional de Antropología in 1961.

In 1965, Fortún co-founded the Instituto Nacional de Estudios Linguisticos with visiting Fulbright professor M. J. Hardman.

While director of the National Cultural Institute, Fortún published the 1973 monograph Educación y Desarrollo Rural, highlighting the importance of education in improving the condition of rural Bolivians. The monograph outlined a proposed reform project in which rural normal schools would be converted into "technical rural normal schools with emphasis on education, health and work."

In June 1973 she participated in the Primer Congreso del Hombre Andino held in northern Chile. There she coordinated alongside Oreste Plath the symposium on "Basic problems of the study of Andean folklore". However, the 1973 Chilean coup d'état on September 11 hindered the publication of the conference proceedings.

In 1975, when Hugo Banzer created the Bolivian Institute of Culture, Fortún was selected as its inaugural director.

== Works ==
Among the books written by Julia Elena Fortún are:

- Música indígena de Bolivia (1947)
- Nuestra música folklórica (1948)
- Manual para la recolección de material folklórico (1957)
- La danza de los diablos (1960)
- La mujer aymara (1964)
