= Bennett Monolith =

Large pre-Columbian sculpture found in Tiwanaku

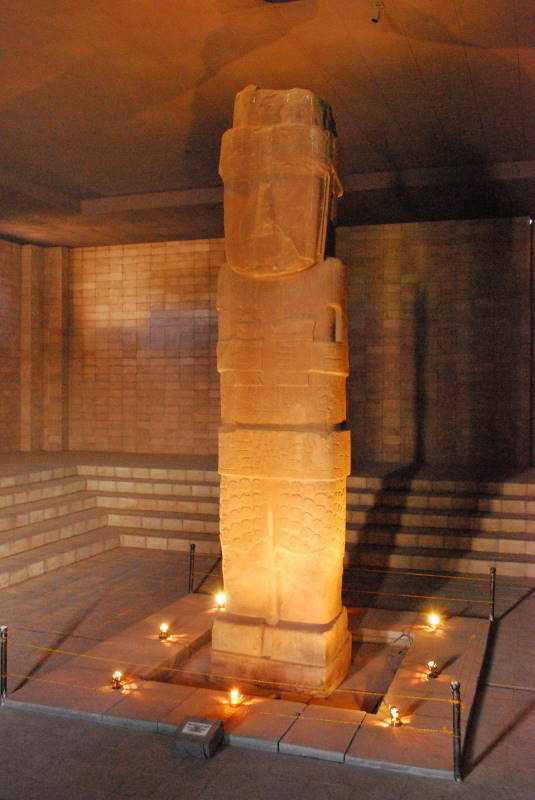
- Bennett Monolith on display
- Material: Sandstone
- Discovered: 1932
- Discovered by: Wendell C. Bennett
- Present location: Tiwanaku Site Museum, Tiwanaku, Bolivia
- Culture: Tiwanaku

The Bennett Monolith is a monumental stone sculpture from the pre-Columbian Tiwanaku civilization, located in present-day Bolivia. Standing approximately 7.3 meters (24 feet) tall and weighing around 20 tons, it is the largest known human-carved monolithic statue in the Andean region.

Originally called "Stela 10", the monolith was named after American archaeologist Wendell C. Bennett, who exhumed the artifact in 1932 from the Semi-Subterranean Temple at the Tiwanaku archaeological site. It was possibly detected earlier in 1903 by the French Scientific Mission.

The monolith was moved and displayed in a plaza in La Paz, Bolivia. In 2000, it was moved back to Tiwanaku. The structure is currently housed at the Tiwanaku Site Museum, near where it was originally found.

The statue is made of reddish sandstone.

== Gallery ==
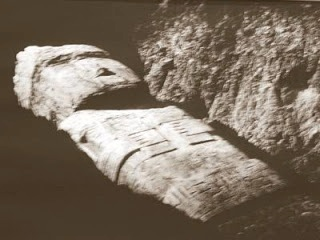
First photograph of the monolith in June 1932

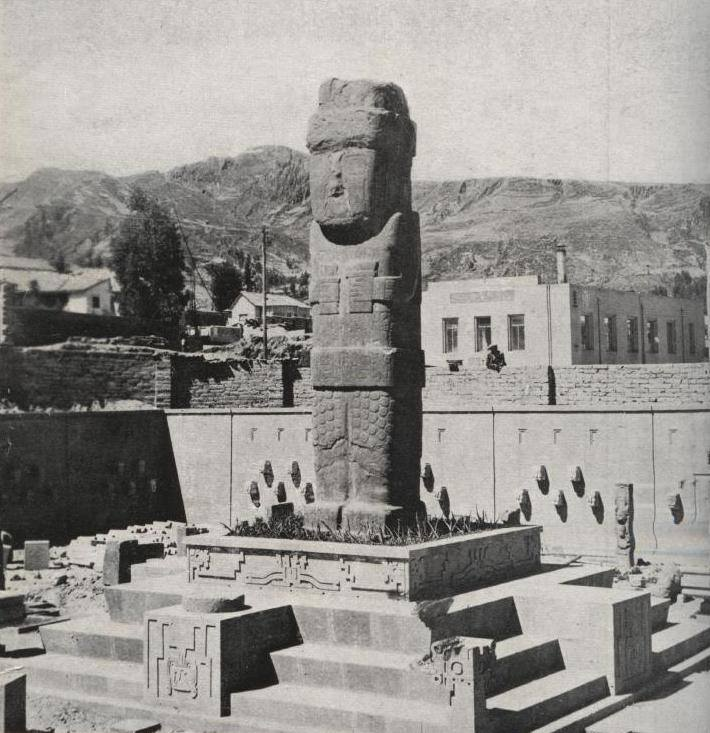
The monolith on display at La Paz

== See also ==
- Ponce Monolith
- Media related to Bennett Monolith at Wikimedia Commons
