= Carlos Ponce Sanginés =

Bolivian archaeologist and restorer

- Born: 6 May 1925; La Paz, Bolivia
- Died: 18 March 2005 (aged 79); La Paz, Bolivia
- Education: Higher University of San Andrés; National University of Córdoba
- Scientific career
- Fields: Archaeology

Carlos Ponce Sanginés (6 May 1925 – 18 March 2005) was a Bolivian archaeologist and restorer who dedicated a significant part of his life to the study of Tiwanaku.

== Biography ==
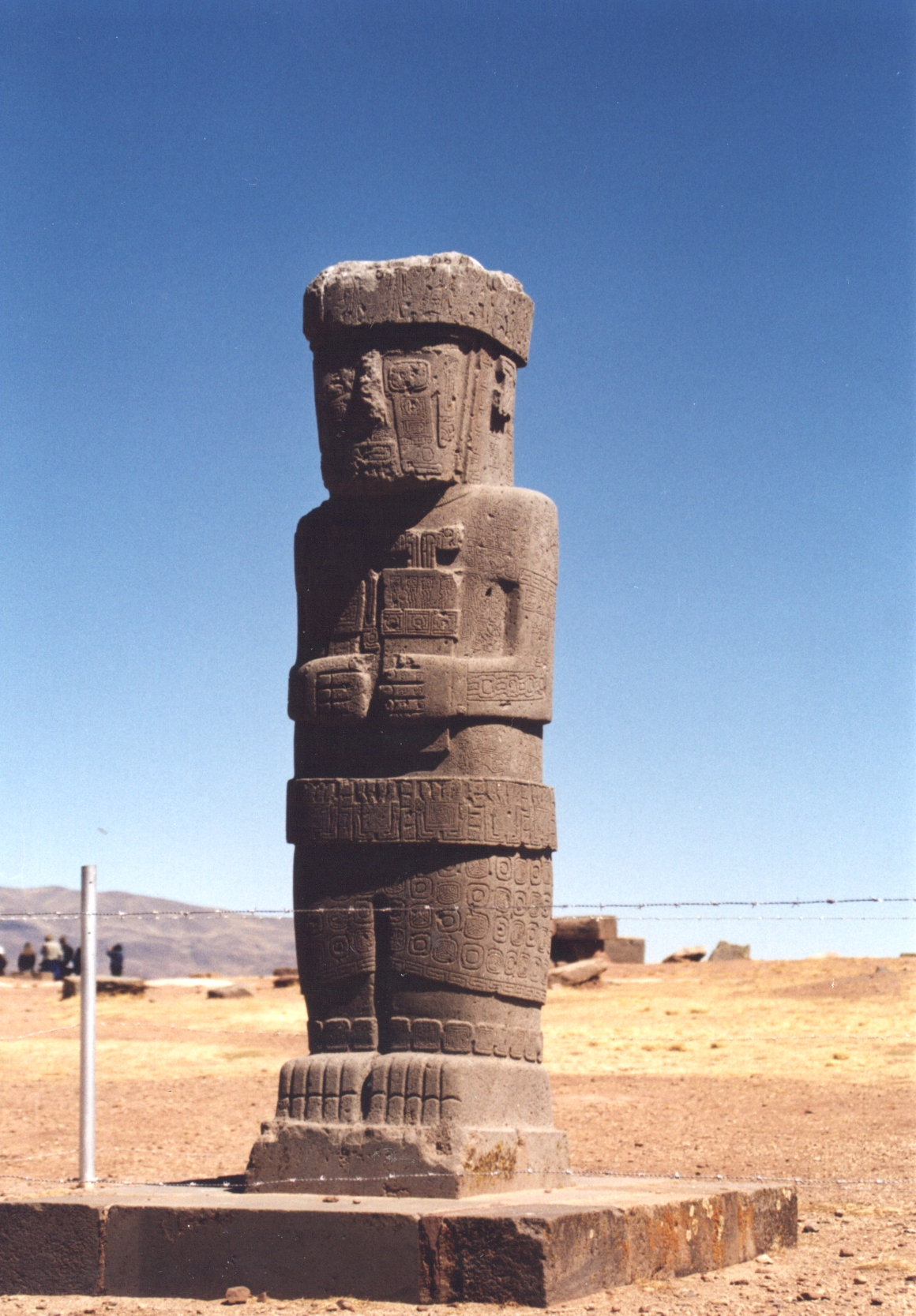
The Ponce Monolith in the Tiwanaku monumental complex, named in honor of its discoverer, the archaeologist Carlos Ponce Sanginés

Ponce Sanginés was born in La Paz, Bolivia in May 1925 and graduated from the archaeology program at the Higher University of San Andrés before specializing at the National University of Córdoba, Argentina.

In 1958, he founded the "Center for Archaeological Research at Tiwanaku" in Bolivia, becoming one of the first Bolivians to study the archaeological site.

He played a crucial role in establishing the National Museum of Archaeology on 31 January 1960, which until then had the status of a multidisciplinary museum. This change was a result of a study conducted by Ponce Sanginés when he served as the Director of the Center for Archaeological Research in Tiwanacu, with the museum being overseen by the architect Gregorio Cordero Miranda at that time.

In 1964, Ponce Sanginés served as the Minister of Peasant Affairs. In that same year, he, along with his wife, Julia Elena Fortún, discovered one of the best-preserved stelae of that culture in Tiwanaku, which was later known as the "Ponce Monolith" in his honor.

He restored the Kalasasaya temple and initiated excavations at Akapana.

In 1975, he founded the National Institute of Archaeology of Bolivia.

He secured the declaration of the Iskanwaya ruins as a national monument in Bolivia.

Throughout his life, he published more than 50 books.

== Awards and honours ==
He was awarded the Condor of the Andes Prize shortly before his death in 2005. He also received the National Culture Award (1977), the Pergamino al Mérito Prize from the Tiawanaku Municipality (1989), the Puma de Oro Prize (1986), the Order of Gold Medal (1978), the Medal of Beloved Son of Samaipata (1974), and the Pedro Domingo Murillo Medal (1971).

== Notable publications ==
- "Tiwanaku Pottery" (1948).
- "Bolivian Archaeology" (1957).
- "Mollo Pottery and the Sculpture of a Chiripa Stone" (1963).
- "Concise Description of the Semi-Subterranean Temple of Tiwanaku" (1964).
- "Tunupa and Ekako" (1969).
- "Cataloging Bolivia's Archaeological Heritage" (1974).
- "Tiwanaku: Space, Time, and Culture" (1976).
- "Tiwanaku: 200 Years of Archaeological Research" (1999).
