= Wendell C. Bennett =

American archeologist (1905–1953)

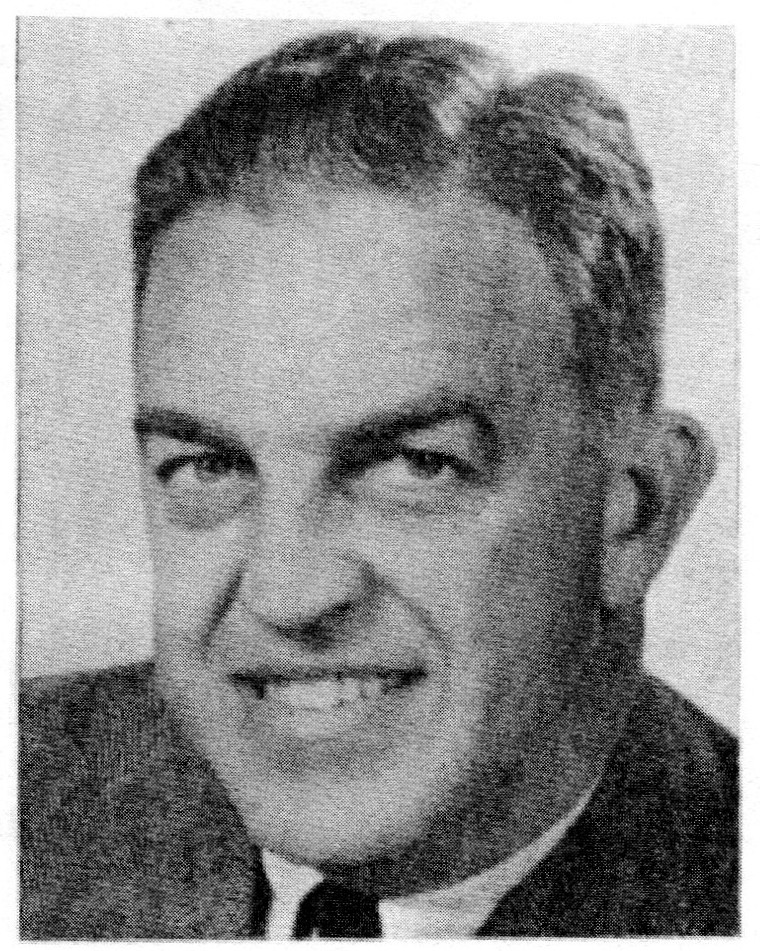
- Born: August 17, 1905; Marion, Indiana, U.S.
- Died: September 6, 1953 (aged 48); Martha's Vineyard, Massachusetts, U.S.
- Education: University of Chicago (B.A., M.A., Ph.D.)
- Children: 2
- Scientific career
- Workplaces: Yale University
- Thesis: Hawaiian heiaus (1930)

Wendell Clark Bennett (August 17, 1905 – September 6, 1953) was an American archaeologist and professor at Yale University. He specialized in the study of Andean civilizations and also studied ancient Hawaiian civilization. The Bennett Monolith is named after him.

Yale University maintains an archive of his work.

== Biography ==
Bennett was born in Marion, Indiana and grew up in Oak Park, Illinois. His father, William Rainey Bennett, was a Protestant minister. Bennett studied at the University of Chicago, earning a bachelor's degree in 1927, a master's degree in 1929, and a Ph.D. in 1930. His graduate studies focused on ancient Hawaiian civilization. His master's thesis was titled "An Archeological survey of the Island of Kauai" and his doctoral thesis was titled "Hawaiian heiaus". He received support from the Bishop Museum in Honolulu to conduct research as a graduate student.

After graduation, he specialized in Andean archaeology through his work at the American Museum of Natural History.

In 1938, Bennett became an Associate Professor of Anthropology at the University of Wisconsin at Madison. He transferred to Yale University in 1940, becoming full Professor there in 1945 and Chairman of the Department of Anthropology in 1949.

He was awarded the Order of the Condor of the Andes by the Bolivian government for discovering and exhuming the Bennett Monolith, which was subsequently named after him.

He was the President of the American Anthropological Association in 1952.

He died of a heart attack while swimming in South Beach at Martha's Vineyard on September 6, 1953.

== Personal life ==
In 1925, he married Hope Ranslow. They had two daughters, Lucy and Martha.

== Bibliography ==
- Wendell C. Bennett and Robert M. Zingg, The Tarahumara: an Indian tribe of northern Mexico (1935).
- Wendell C. Bennett, Excavations at Wari, Ayacucho, Peru (1953).
