= Tiwanaku Site Museum =

Archaeological museum in Tiwanaku, Bolivia

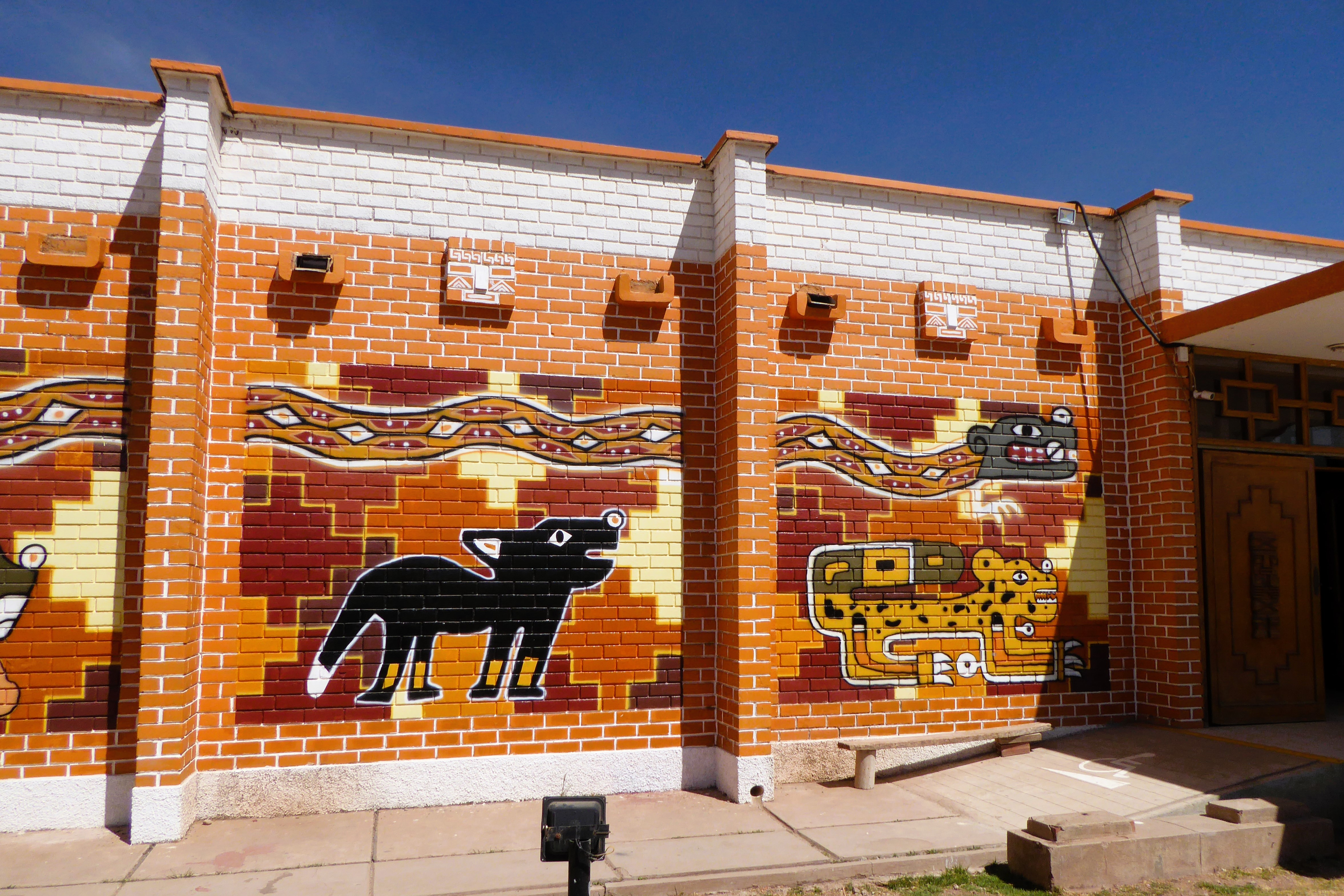
- Established: 24 June 2002; 24 years ago
- Location: Tiwanaku, La Paz, Bolivia
- Coordinates: 16°33′28.76″S 68°40′32.99″W
- Website: tiwanaku.gob.bo

The Tiwanaku Site Museum is an archaeological museum located in Tiwanaku, La Paz, Bolivia, near the Tiwanaku pre-Columbian archaeological site.

It houses numerous funerary archaeological artifacts, ceramic pieces, and stone sculptures. One of the most important figures in the museum is the Bennett Monolith, which is the largest stele ever found in the Andean world.

The building was designed by architect Carlos Villagómez. The inclusion of an open court in the center of the museum was influenced by Tiwanaku design. Since 2000, the site has been managed by the local Aymara people. The museum was inaugurated on June 24, 2002.

== Gallery ==
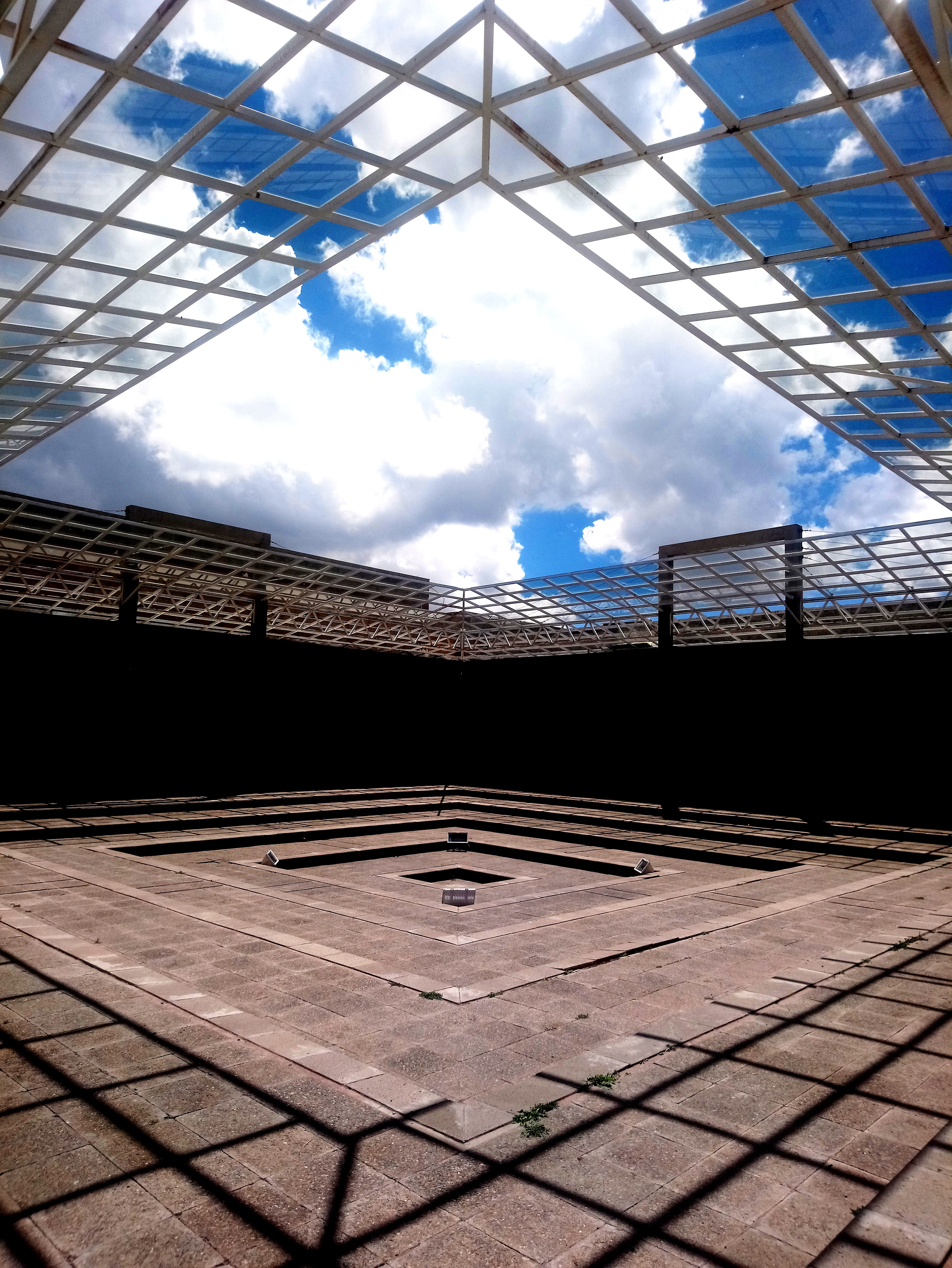
Center patio

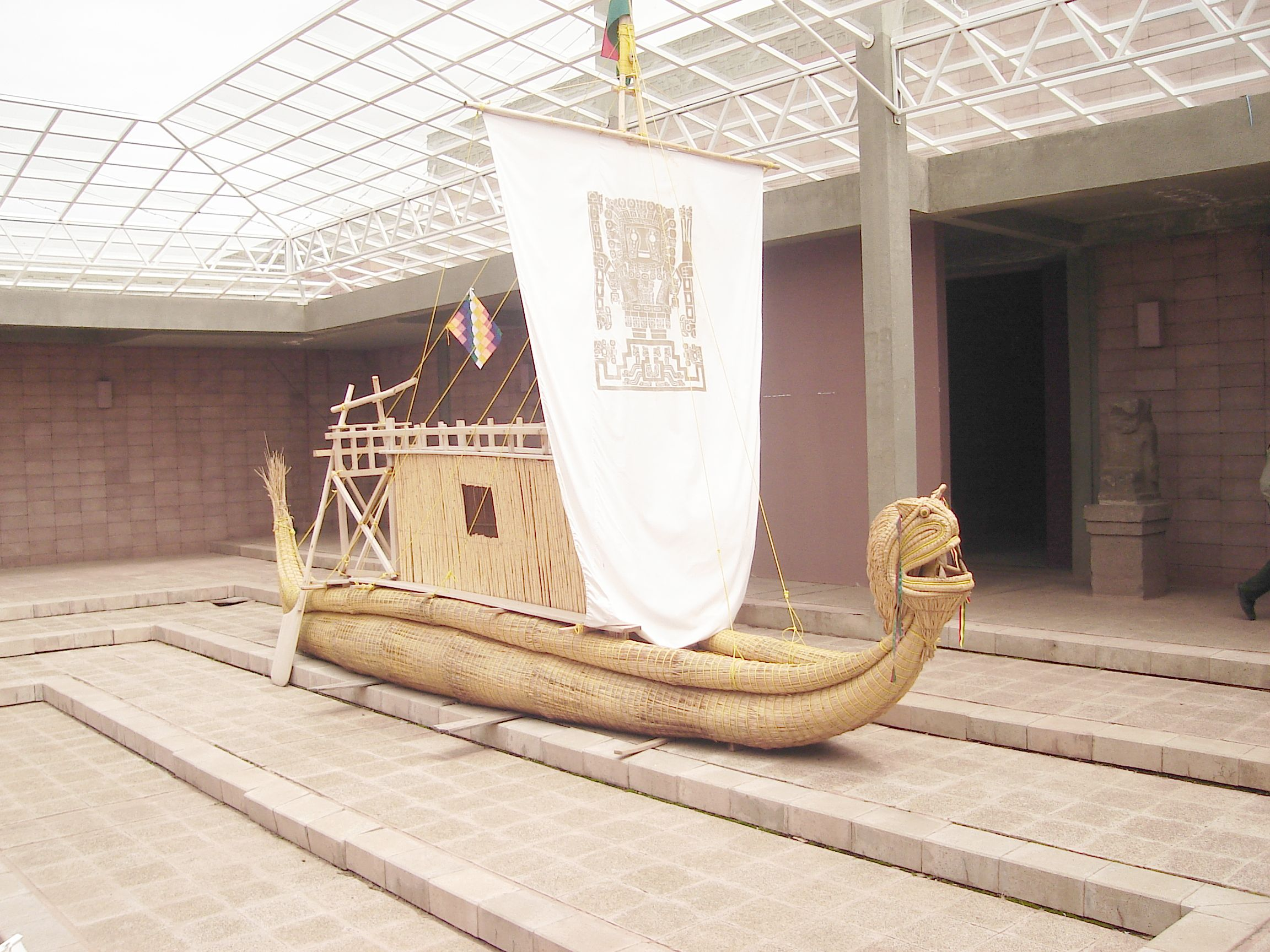

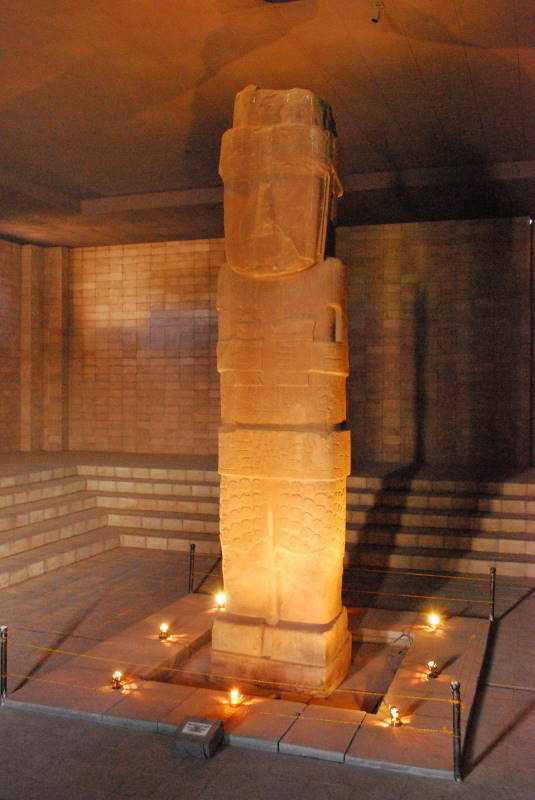
Bennett Monolith

== See also ==
- Media related to Museo del Sitio de Tiwanaku at Wikimedia Commons
