= Ponce Monolith =

Monolith of the Tiwanaku culture, Bolivia

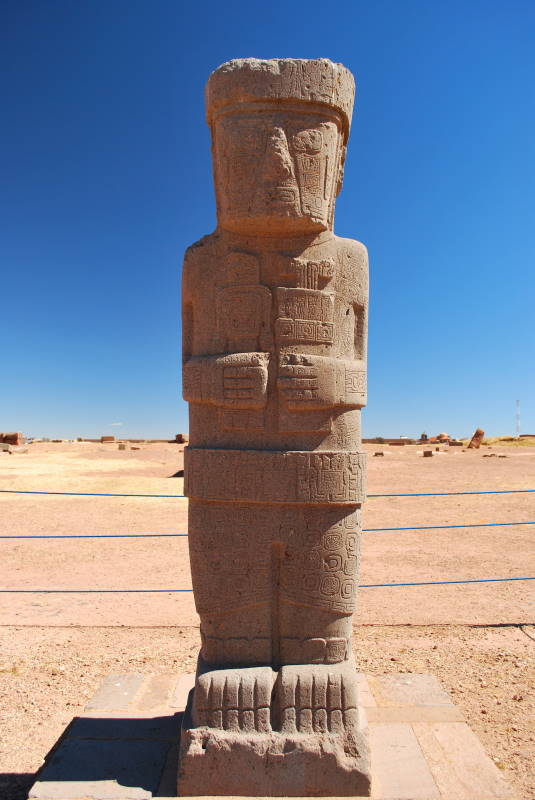
- Material: Andesite
- Discovered: 1957
- Discovered by: Carlos Ponce Sanginés
- Culture: Tiwanaku

The Ponce Monolith, also known as the Ponce Stela, is a monumental stone sculpture from the pre-Columbian Tiwanaku civilization. It is located in the Kalasasaya area of the ruins of Tiwanaku in Bolivia. The statue holds a qiru in its left hand and a snuff tray in its right.

The monolith was discovered by Spaniards, who carved a cross on the shoulder of the monument and left it buried. It was named after Bolivian archaeologist Carlos Ponce Sanginés, who headed the archaeology team that exhumed it in 1957. It is the second largest monolith discovered in that area, after the Bennett Monolith.

In 2019, a series of new banknotes was introduced into circulation in Bolivia. On the reverse of the 200 boliviano note is the site of Kalasasaya with a view of the Ponce Monolith. The stela also appeared on a 1960 postage stamp.

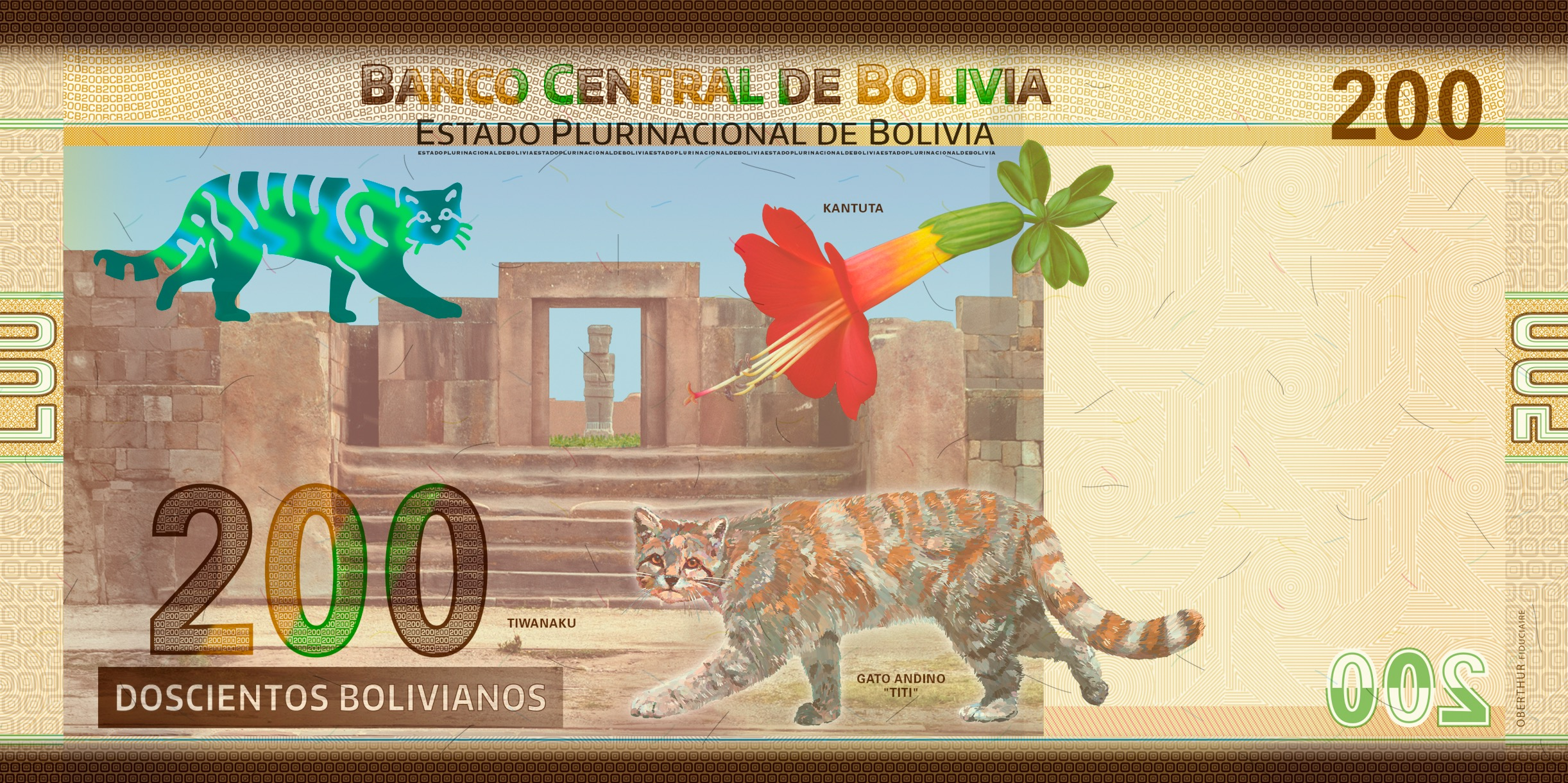
New banknote of Plurinational State of Bolivia in 2019
