= Tiwanaku, La Paz =

- Town
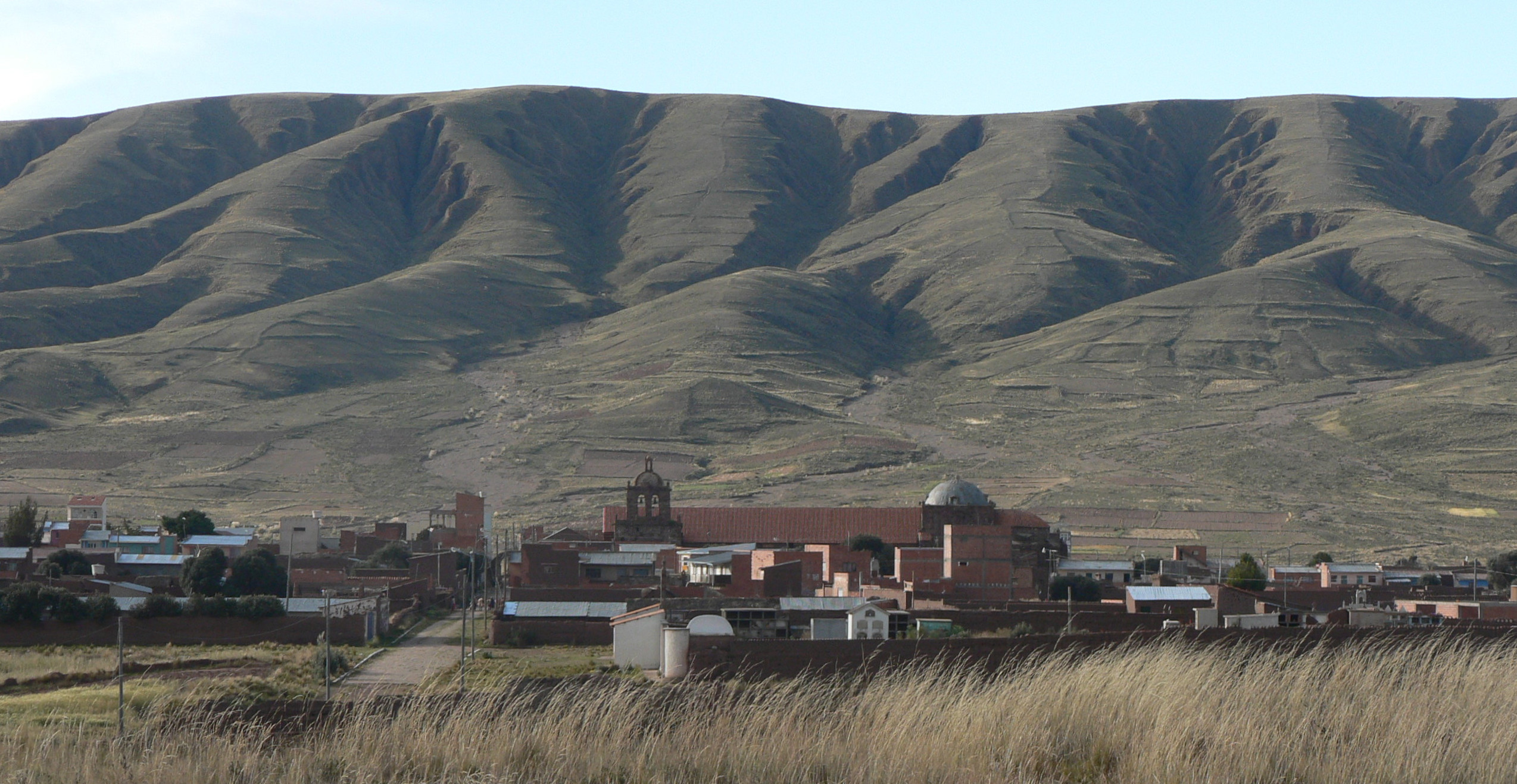
- The village of Tiwanaku as seen from the south

- Flag
- Interactive map of Tiwanaku, La Paz
- Coordinates: 16°33′S 68°42′W
- Country: Bolivia
- Department: La Paz Department
- Province: Ingavi Province

Population (2013)
  - Total: 860
- Time zone: UTC-4 (BOT)
- Climate: Cwc

Tiwanaku is a village and municipality in the La Paz Department, Bolivia. Towards the south of the village, there is the pre-Columbian archaeological site of Tiwanaku.

The village has about 1,000 inhabitants, mostly belonging to the Aymara ethnic group.

According to the 2024 Bolivian census, the population of the municipality of Tiwanaku was 13,568 inhabitants.

== Climate ==
Climate data for Tiwanaku, La Paz, elevation 3,629 m (11,906 ft)
Month	Jan	Feb	Mar	Apr	May	Jun	Jul	Aug	Sep	Oct	Nov	Dec	Year
Mean daily maximum °C (°F)	15.9 (60.6)	16.5 (61.7)	16.4 (61.5)	16.7 (62.1)	16.0 (60.8)	14.9 (58.8)	15.0 (59.0)	15.7 (60.3)	16.3 (61.3)	17.9 (64.2)	18.2 (64.8)	17.4 (63.3)	16.4 (61.5)
Daily mean °C (°F)	9.8 (49.6)	10.0 (50.0)	9.7 (49.5)	8.5 (47.3)	5.9 (42.6)	4.2 (39.6)	3.9 (39.0)	5.3 (41.5)	7.1 (44.8)	9.0 (48.2)	10.1 (50.2)	10.0 (50.0)	7.8 (46.0)
Mean daily minimum °C (°F)	3.7 (38.7)	3.6 (38.5)	3.0 (37.4)	0.4 (32.7)	−4.1 (24.6)	−6.5 (20.3)	−7.2 (19.0)	−5.7 (21.7)	−2.2 (28.0)	0.0 (32.0)	2.0 (35.6)	2.6 (36.7)	−0.9 (30.4)
Average precipitation mm (inches)	138 (5.4)	103 (4.1)	88 (3.5)	43 (1.7)	16 (0.6)	4 (0.2)	8 (0.3)	14 (0.6)	39 (1.5)	39 (1.5)	63 (2.5)	91 (3.6)	646 (25.5)
Source: Plataforma digital única del Estado Peruano

== Attractions ==
- The Tiwanaku archaeological site, including the Tiwanaku Site Museum and ceramic museum.
