= Kalasasaya =

Archaeological site in Bolivia

Coordinates: 16.555°S 68.6736°W

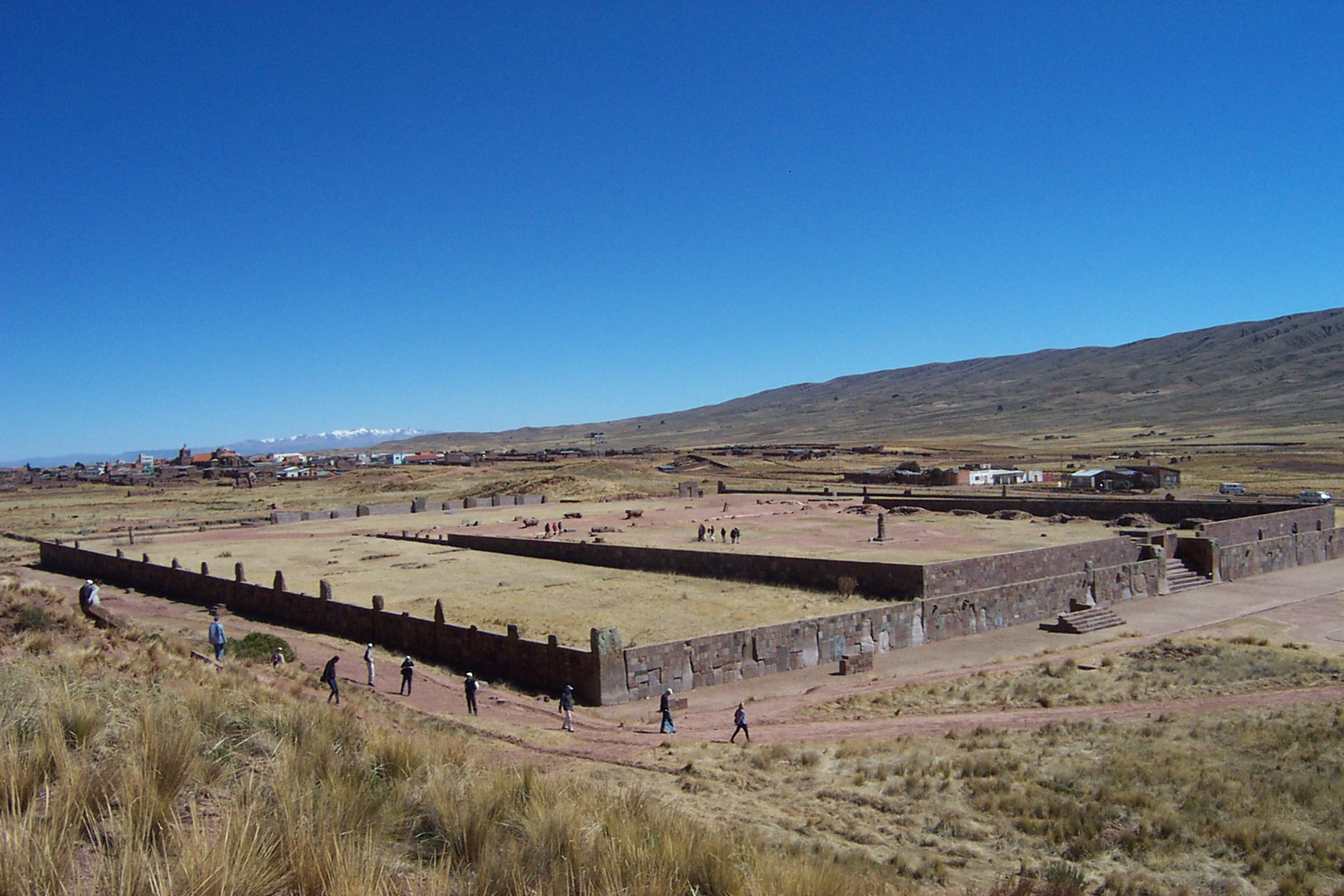
General view of Kalasasaya

The Kalasasaya (also: Kalassasaya; kala for stone; saya or sayasta for standing up) or Stopped Stones is a major archaeological structure that is part of Tiwanaku, an ancient archeological complex in the Andes of western Bolivia that is designated as a UNESCO World Heritage Site.

The Kalasasaya is a low platform mound with a large courtyard, which is surrounded by high stone walls. The Kalasasaya is about 120 by 130 meters in dimension and aligned to the cardinal directions. Like the other platform mounds within Tiwanaku, it has a central sunken court. This sunken court can be reached by a monumental staircase through an opening in its eastern wall. The walls are composed of sandstone pillars that alternated with sections of smaller blocks of Ashlar masonry. This wall has been reconstructed in modern times. From 1957-1960 excavations took place at the site where all 4 walls were reconstructed along with the entrance gate. The Ponce Monolith is found within the Kalasasaya courtyard.

The Kalasasaya dates to at least 200 BCE - 200 CE. It is located to the north of the Akapana and west of the Semi-Subterranean Temple, other structures in the complex.

The area between the Kalasasaya complex and the Pumapunku complex a kilometre away was surveyed around 2007 using ground-penetrating radar, magnetometry, induced electrical conductivity, and magnetic susceptibility. The geophysical data collected from these surveys and excavations indicate the presence of numerous man-made structures in the area between the Pumapunku and Kalasasaya complexes. These structures include the wall foundations of buildings and compounds, water conduits, pool-like features, revetments, terraces, residential compounds, and widespread gravel pavements, all of which are buried and hidden beneath the modern ground surface.
